= Winchester Cathedral =

- Cathedral Church of the Holy Trinity and of Saint Peter and Saint Paul and of Saint Swithun in Winchester
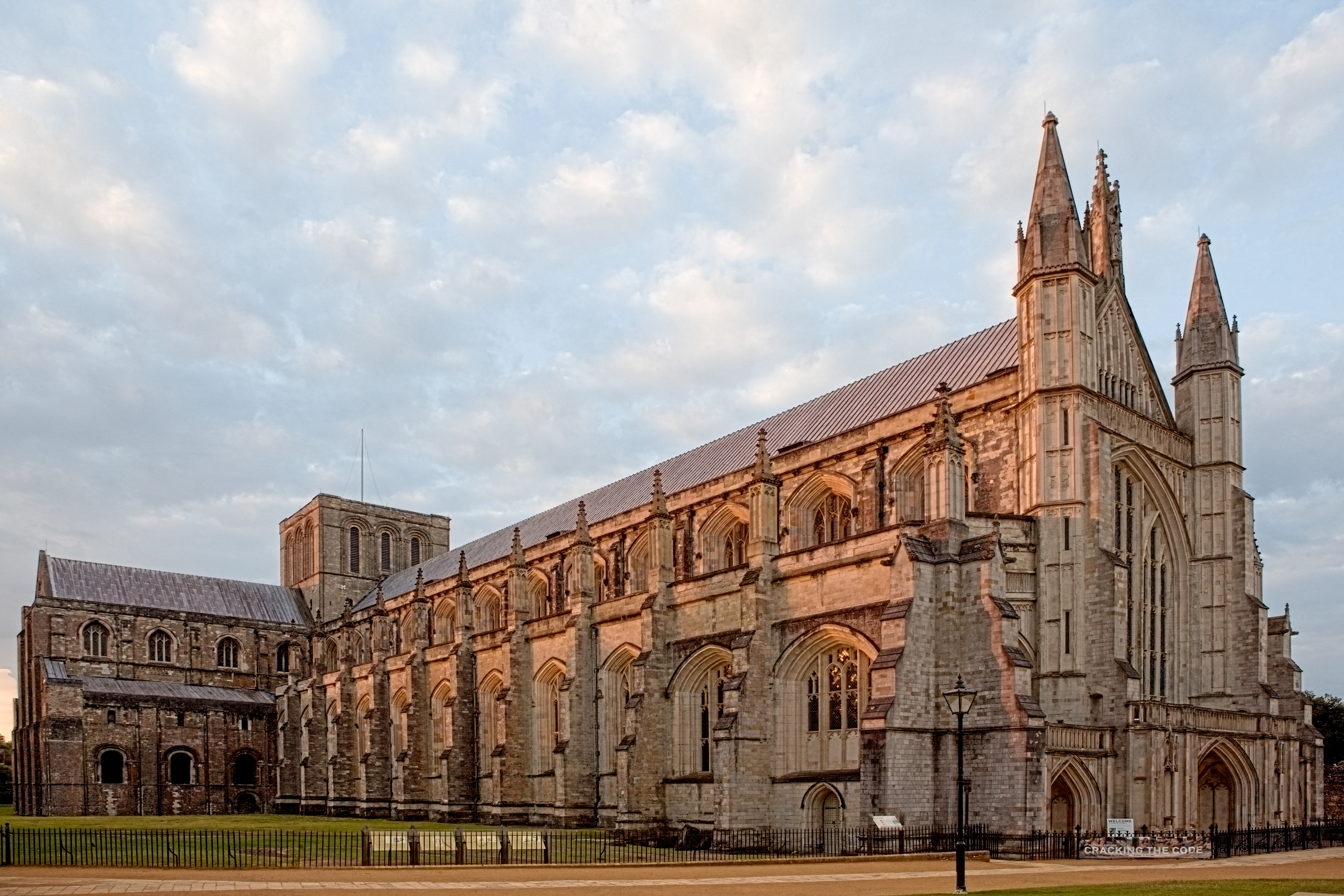
- View of the long nave, central tower and west end.

- Location within Hampshire
- 51°3′38″N 1°18′47″W
- OS grid reference: SU 48232 29265
- Location: Winchester, Hampshire
- Country: England
- Denomination: Church of England
- Previous denomination: Roman Catholic
- Website: www.winchester-cathedral.org.uk

History
- Dedication: Holy Trinity; Paul the Apostle; Peter the Apostle; Swithun

Architecture
- Heritage designation: Grade I
- Designated: 24 March 1950
- Style: Norman, Gothic
- Years built: 1079–1532
- Groundbreaking: 1079; 947 years ago

Specifications
- Length: 558 ft 1 in (170.1 m)

Administration
- Province: Canterbury
- Diocese: Winchester

Clergy
- Bishop: Philip Mounstephen
- Dean: Christopher Palmer

Winchester Cathedral, formally the Cathedral Church of the Holy Trinity and of Saint Peter and Saint Paul and of Saint Swithun in Winchester, is the cathedral of the city of Winchester, England, and is among the largest of its kind in Northern Europe. The cathedral is the seat of the bishop of Winchester and is the mother church for the ancient Diocese of Winchester. It is run by a dean and chapter, under the dean of Winchester.

The cathedral as it stands today was built from 1079 to 1532 and is dedicated to numerous saints, most notably Swithun. It has a very long and very wide nave in the Perpendicular Gothic style, an Early English retroquire, and Norman transepts and tower. With an overall length of 558 feet (170 m), it is the longest medieval cathedral in the world. With an area of 53,480 square feet (4,968 m^{2}), it is also the sixth-largest cathedral by area in the UK, surpassed only by Liverpool, St Paul's, York, Westminster (RC) and Lincoln.

A major tourist attraction, the cathedral attracted 365,000 visitors in 2019, an increase of 12,000 from 2018.

== History ==
=== Earlier buildings ===
Though churches were recorded in Winchester as early as 164, the first Christian church can be traced back to c. 648, when King Cenwalh of Wessex built a small, cross-shaped building just north of the present building. This building, known as the Old Minster, became the cathedral for the new Diocese of Winchester in 662, a vast area stretching from the English Channel to the River Thames, the bishopric having been transferred from Dorchester on Thames, Oxfordshire by Bishop Wine. The design of this early church cannot be confirmed, for no trace other than ground plan exists today, but Wolstan mentions a gateway tower situated some distance from the west end. Wine died in c. 672, but one of his later successors, Swithun, would become one of the most famous Bishops of Winchester.

Whether Swithun himself oversaw any expansion of the Old Minster is unknown, but it is recorded in Acta Sanctorum that from 963 to 984, Bishop Æthelwold greatly expanded the church, the works being finished by the following Bishop, Alphege. The church was rededicated in 993, and consisted of a central tower, north and south aisles, transepts, crypt and an apse, and was briefly the largest church in Europe. Also on the site was the New Minster, in direct competition with the neighbouring Old Minster. The New Minster was begun by Alfred the Great but completed in 901 by his son Edward the Elder. These two monasteries existed side by side, the monks becoming virtually intertwined with one another. Swithun's body, which according to his wishes had been buried in the graveyard outside the church, was brought inside and housed in a magnificent shrine.

=== Norman cathedral ===
When William the Conqueror invaded England in 1066, he began to install his own bishops in place of the Anglo-Saxon bishops. William installed his friend and relative Walkelin as the first Norman bishop of Winchester in 1070, and nine years later, in 1079, Walkelin began the construction of a huge new Norman cathedral, on a site just to the south of the Old and New Minsters, the site of the present building. The new cathedral was consecrated with the completion of the east end in 1093, and the many tombs of Saxon kings moved from the Old Minster into the new cathedral. The following day, demolition of the New and Old Minsters began, and quickly progressed, leaving virtually no remains. The outline of the Old Minster can still be seen today to the north of the present nave.

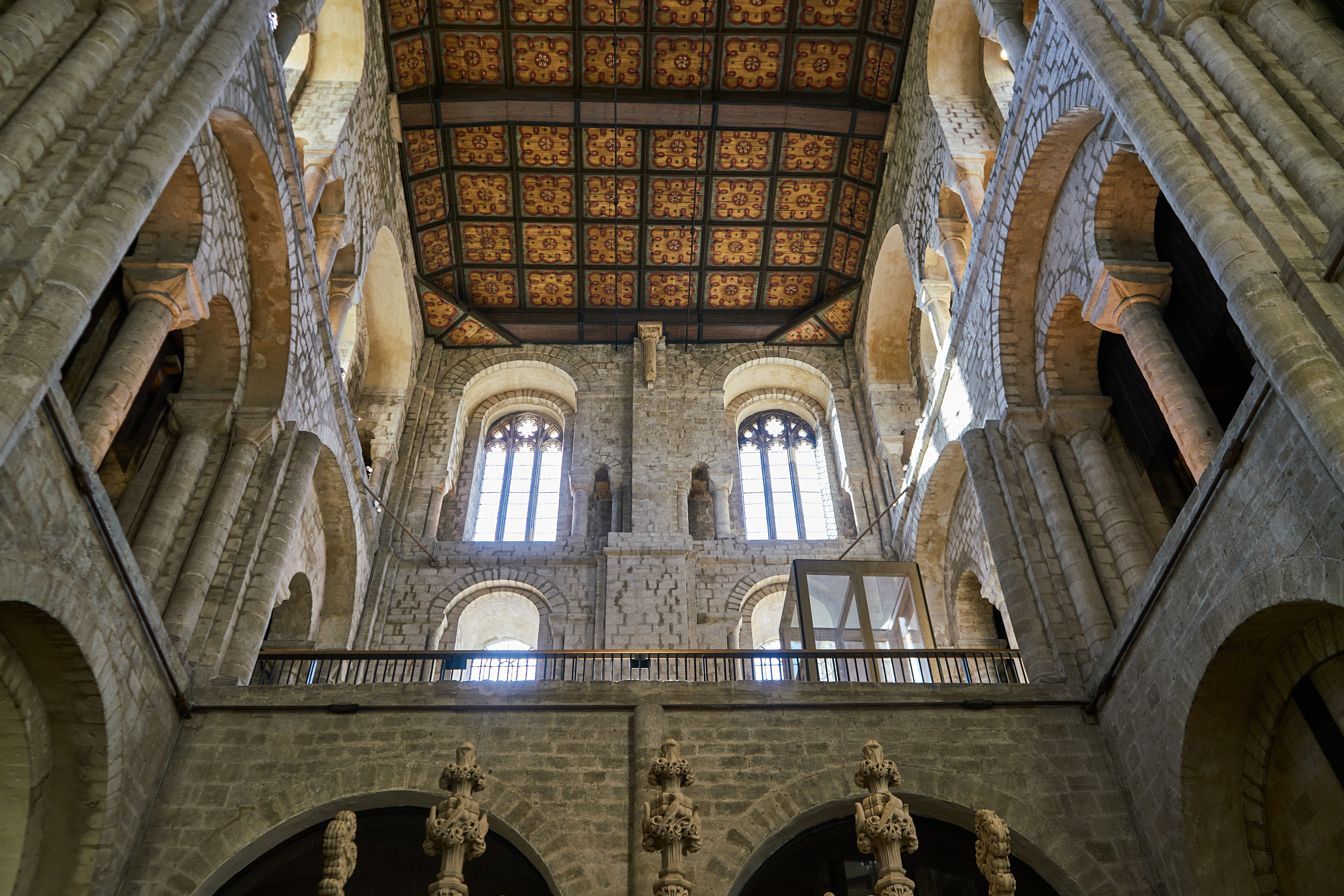
Norman south transept

Work quickly progressed to the transepts and central tower, and these were certainly complete by 1100 when William Rufus was buried underneath the crossing tower. Work to the nave was probably interrupted in 1107 when the central tower fell, but was restarted following reconstruction of the tower, and completed before the death of William Giffard, who was bishop of Winchester from 1100 to his death in 1129. The standard of much of this building work was high, and thus much of it survives in the present building, most notably in the transepts which have an appearance almost as Walkelin left them. This building was monumental in size, more than 500 feet (150 m) in length, and it still makes up the core of the present building.

=== Gothic expansions ===
The first alteration to Walkelin's cathedral was in 1202 when Bishop Godfrey de Luci started construction of a new Early English retroquire. Luci died in 1204, but the work continued under successive bishops, eventually resulting in the demolition of the Norman apse.

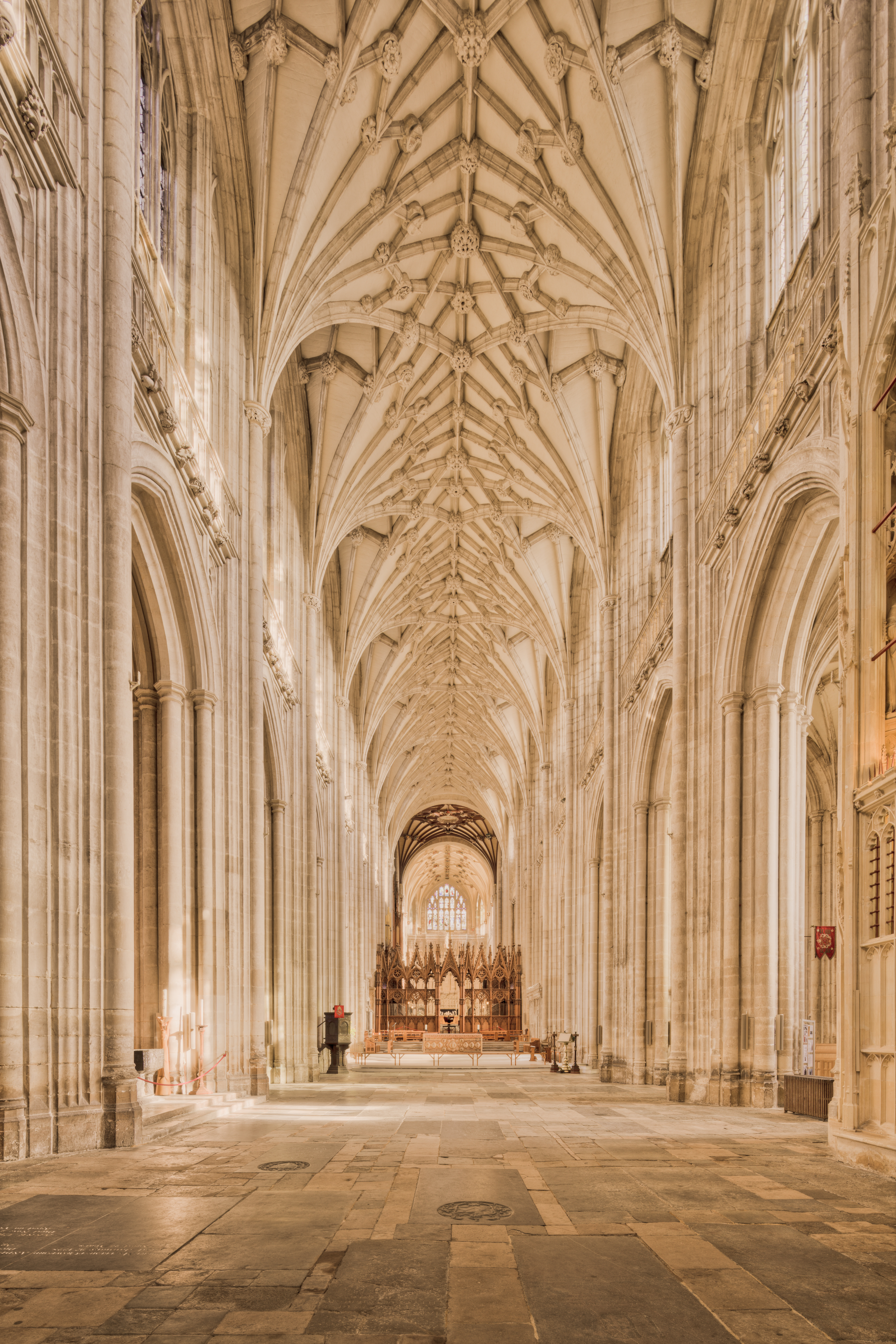
William of Wykeham’s remodelled Gothic nave, the longest in Europe

The next expansions and rebuilding took place the mid 14th century, when in 1346, Bishop Edington demolished the Norman west front and began building a new Perpendicular Gothic facade, featuring a huge west window, which still stands today. Edington also began renovation of the nave, but this was mostly carried out by his successors, most notably William of Wykeham and his master mason, William Wynford, who remodelled the massive Norman nave into a soaring Perpendicular Gothic masterpiece. This they achieved by encasing the Norman stone in new ashlar, recutting the piers with Gothic mouldings and pointed arches, and reorganising the three-tier nave into two tiers, by extending the arcade upwards into what was the triforium and extending the clerestory downwards to meet it. The wooden ceiling was replaced with a decorative stone vault. Following Wykeham's death in 1404, this remodelling work continued under successive bishops, and was completed c. 1420.

Wykeham's successor, Henry Beaufort (1405–1447) carried out fewer alterations, adding a chantry on the south side of the retroquire, although work on the nave continued. From 1450 to 1528, under the leadership of Bishops William Waynflete, Peter Courtenay, Thomas Langton and Richard Foxe, major rebuilding and expansion was carried out on the Norman choir and Early English retroquire. This work included the building of further chantry chapels in the retroquire, the replacement of the Norman east end with a Perpendicular Gothic presbytery, and the extension of Luci's retroquire into a Lady Chapel. Unlike the rebuilding of the nave some 100 years earlier, the Gothic presbytery was vaulted in wood and painted to look like stone, as at York Minster. After its progressive extensions, the east end is now about 110 feet (34 m) beyond that of Walkelin's building.

=== Dissolution of the Monasteries ===
King Henry VIII seized control of the Catholic Church in England and declared himself head of the new Church of England. The Benedictine foundation, the Priory of Saint Swithun, was dissolved. The priory surrendered to the king in 1539. Richard Pollard and Thomas Wriothesley came to dismantle the shrines and altar; the shrine of St Swithun was destroyed. The next year a new chapter was formed, and the last prior, William Basyng, was appointed dean. Mary I married Philip of Spain here in 1554. The monastic buildings, including the cloister and chapter house, were later demolished, mostly during the 1560–1580 tenure of the reformist bishop Robert Horne.

=== 17th–19th centuries ===
The 17th century saw important changes to the interior, including the erection of a choir screen by Inigo Jones in 1638–1639, the insertion of a wooden fan vault underneath the crossing tower (previously the tower was open to the church) and the destruction of much medieval glass and imagery by Parliamentarian soldiers in December 1642, including the near-complete destruction of the massive Great West Window by Cromwell and his forces. The window was put back together by the townspeople as a mosaic following the Restoration of the Monarchy, but it has never regained its original appearance as the damage was too great.

In the 18th century, many visitors commented on the neglect of the cathedral and the town; Daniel Defoe described the latter in about 1724 as "a place of no trade ... no manufacture, no navigation".

Major restoration followed in the early 19th century under the direction of architect William Garbett and then John Nash. Jane Austen was buried in the north nave aisle in 1817, and many visitors continue to come today to see her final resting place.

=== 20th century restoration ===
At the turn of the 20th century, Winchester Cathedral was in grave danger of collapse, and by the summer of 1905, the Dean, William Furneaux, was facing the imminent ruin of the building. Huge cracks had appeared in the walls, some of them large enough for a small child to crawl into, the walls were bulging and leaning, and stone fell from the walls. Furneaux brought in a leading architect of the age, Thomas G. Jackson. Jackson's prognosis was grim, and his survey showed the entire building was listing to the south-east, and sinking into the soft ground, most likely due to defects in the foundations. On his instructions, large sections of the building were shored up with timber. Initial estimates for the cost of the repair were £20,000 in 1905.

Jackson, acknowledging he was out of his depth, brought in engineer Francis Fox, whose company had completed projects such as the Mersey Tunnel. Jackson and Fox sunk a trench to the foundations of the east end and discovered the Normans had constructed the entire cathedral on a 'floating raft', consisting of a 15-inch-thick layer of beech trees, laid diagonally one on top of the other. Some of these beech trees were solid, but others had rotted and collapsed, and as they did so, the cathedral shifted and sank into the soft ground, which was not strong enough to support the enormous weight of the building, causing the cracks, bulges and leaning walls. Fox removed a layer of topsoil, and ten feet of clay, at which point they arrived at the raft. Below this was a solid layer of peat, about 8 feet (2.4 m) thick, and below this at a depth of 16 to 24 feet (4.9 to 7.3 m) below the cathedral floor, they encountered a more solid layer of gravel, which they intended to utilise as the new base for the foundations.

Jackson and Fox proposed to sink a series of trenches around the eastern end, about 50 in number, down to the gravel bed, and to build up to the raft with concrete and brick. However, the upper walls were so weak that digging under the foundations without supporting the walls could bring the structure down. Therefore, Fox began grouting the walls using the 'Greathead Grouting Machine' to fill in the cracks. When grouting was completed, a new problem was encountered. When the peat was dug through to reach the gravel bed, water rushed up to a height of fourteen feet. The peat had acted as a seal, and when it was broken, water from the nearby River Itchen flooded the trenches. Jackson ordered a powerful steam pump to remove the water from the trenches. This caused a rift between Fox and Jackson, as Fox thought the pumping could further destabilise the foundations and cause the collapse of the building. Pumping nevertheless began.

In the spring of 1906, there were signs Fox was right – the cathedral was still moving and sinking, and this time, more rapidly than before. It was realised for the first time that there was a serious risk to lives. Fox made a site visit in March 1906 and became concerned because the water being pumped out was no longer clear but was cloudy, containing chalk. He ordered pumping stopped. The pump had disturbed a layer of chalk silt between the peat and gravel bed, which further destabilised the building. Jackson was against stopping pumping, as he could not see an alternative. Fox, however, summoned diver William Walker from London, who arrived in Winchester on 5 April 1906.

Walker, who was arguably the most experienced diver in the country at the time, had an extremely challenging job. His task was to descend into the flooded trenches in a primitive and immensely heavy diving suit and level the trenches, by removing the peat topsoil and then laying bags of cement to plug the water coming up from below. Walker's suit weighed 200 lb (91 kg) dry, and the trenches were cramped and pitch-black; Walker had to feel around with his hands. Additional challenges were that the water was full of bodies and graves, which made the water septic. Walker worked 6 to 7 hour shifts almost every day for six years to achieve this, diving under the majority of the cathedral building. When he had completed his work in 1911, the pump could be used safely to remove the water without disturbing the foundations. In 1911, flying buttresses were added along the length of the south nave to complete the work.

A special service was held on St Swithun's Day in 1912, attended by the King and Queen, to give thanks for the work of Jackson, Fox and Walker. Walker was later rewarded with the MVO and is credited with saving the cathedral from collapse. The total cost of the work was £113,000, equivalent in 2017 to nearly £9 million. Walker laid more than 25,000 bags of concrete, 115,000 concrete blocks, and 900,000 bricks.

=== 21st century ===
In February 2000, a three-year project was completed to clean and conserve the nave and west front, which were last cleaned in 1897. For those three years, the nave had been covered with scaffolding both internally and externally. Following the removal of the scaffolding in early 2000, it was the first time the cathedral interior had been free of scaffolding since 1990.

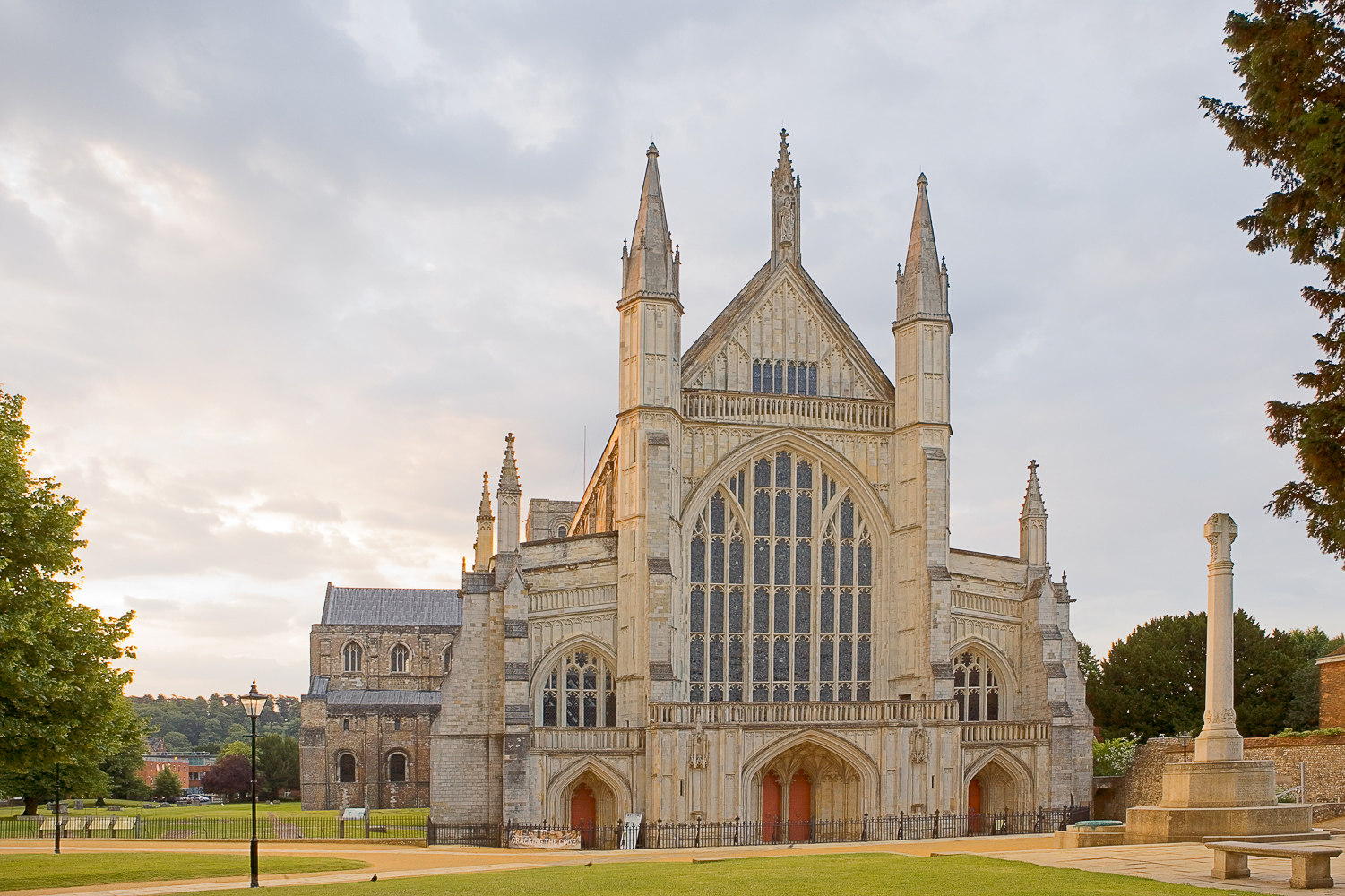
The west front in 2012, after restoration

During August 2006, a near-catastrophic fire was narrowly averted, when a flying Chinese lantern got caught on the roof and began setting fire to it. No lasting damage took place and the fire was quickly extinguished. A spokesman for Hampshire Fire & Rescue said that had it not been spotted, the fire could have been similar in scale to the 1984 fire at York Minster, which almost completely destroyed the south transept.

In March 2011, a new single-storey extension in the corner of the north presbytery aisle was completed. Called the Fleury building after it was officially opened by the abbot of Fleury from L'Abbaye de St-Benôit-sur-Loire in France, it was the first new extension on the cathedral building since the lady chapel was extended in the mid 16th century. The new building housed toilet facilities, storage and a new boiler, replacing a remote facility in the Wessex Hotel a short distance away. The new extension cost £820,000, which was raised by the Friends of Winchester Cathedral.

==== 2012–2019 restoration ====
During September 2012, fundraising began for a planned £19 million programme of repair and expansion. This project aimed to repair and conserve the ancient stained-glass windows of the presbytery clerestory, restore the wooden vault of the presbytery, replace the lead roof of the east end, rewire the building with a new sound system, and open a new exhibition on the Winchester Bible in the south transept triforium.

During the end of 2012, a high-level internal access scaffold was erected in the presbytery to enable close inspection of the vault and clerestory windows. The vault was subject to a detailed construction and paint analyses. The results of the inspection and analysis revealed severe corrosion in the windows, many of which had holes in and collapsed glass, and the failure of the lead roof above, which was causing degrading to the 16th-century wooden vault of the presbytery. A trial removal of the 1950s paint revealed the surviving 16th-century paint underneath on the nearly 200 roof bosses. In July 2013, a £10.5 million grant from the Heritage Lottery Fund allowed the restoration work to begin.

In 2014, a birdcage or suspended scaffold was installed below the vault in the presbytery, where it was expected to stay for four years. This scaffold allowed close contact with the vaults and clerestory windows to be repaired. The scaffold weighed 5 tonnes. Also in 2014, the south transept was removed of all of its items including 7,000 books from the library, to allow it to be restored and made ready for the new exhibition, Kings and Scribes, which was planned to open in the triforium at the end of the restoration project. The south transept was then filled with scaffolding and sealed off at the tower arch from the rest of the cathedral, which was expected to remain for nearly three years.

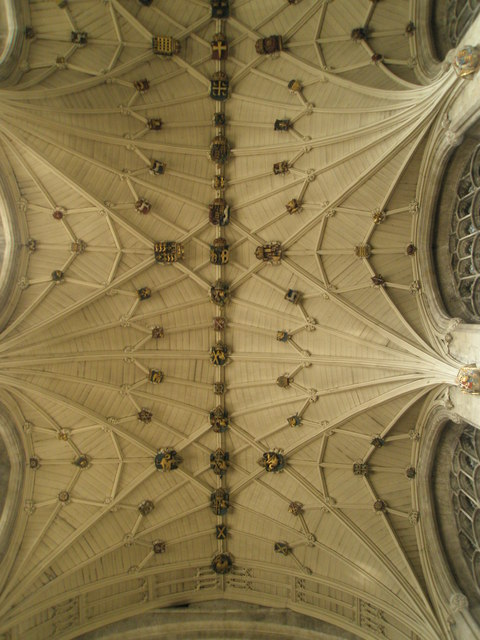
The presbytery vault in February 2009, before restoration

In January 2015, a massive scaffolding frame began to be assembled in the Outer Close, which would be raised to cover the entire presbytery roof. In March 2015, a 300 tonne crane lifted the 27 tonne scaffolding frame to a height of 80 feet (24 m) above the cathedral floor onto the roof. This scaffolding frame, which was moulded to the shape of the roof, was then covered with a waterproof layer to allow the lead underneath to be removed. Over the next few weeks, 54 tonnes of lead were removed from the roof, dating back as far as the early 19th century, and sent to Leicester to be recast. This stage of work was completed in May 2016 with the removal of the external scaffolding and the completion of the lead replacement.

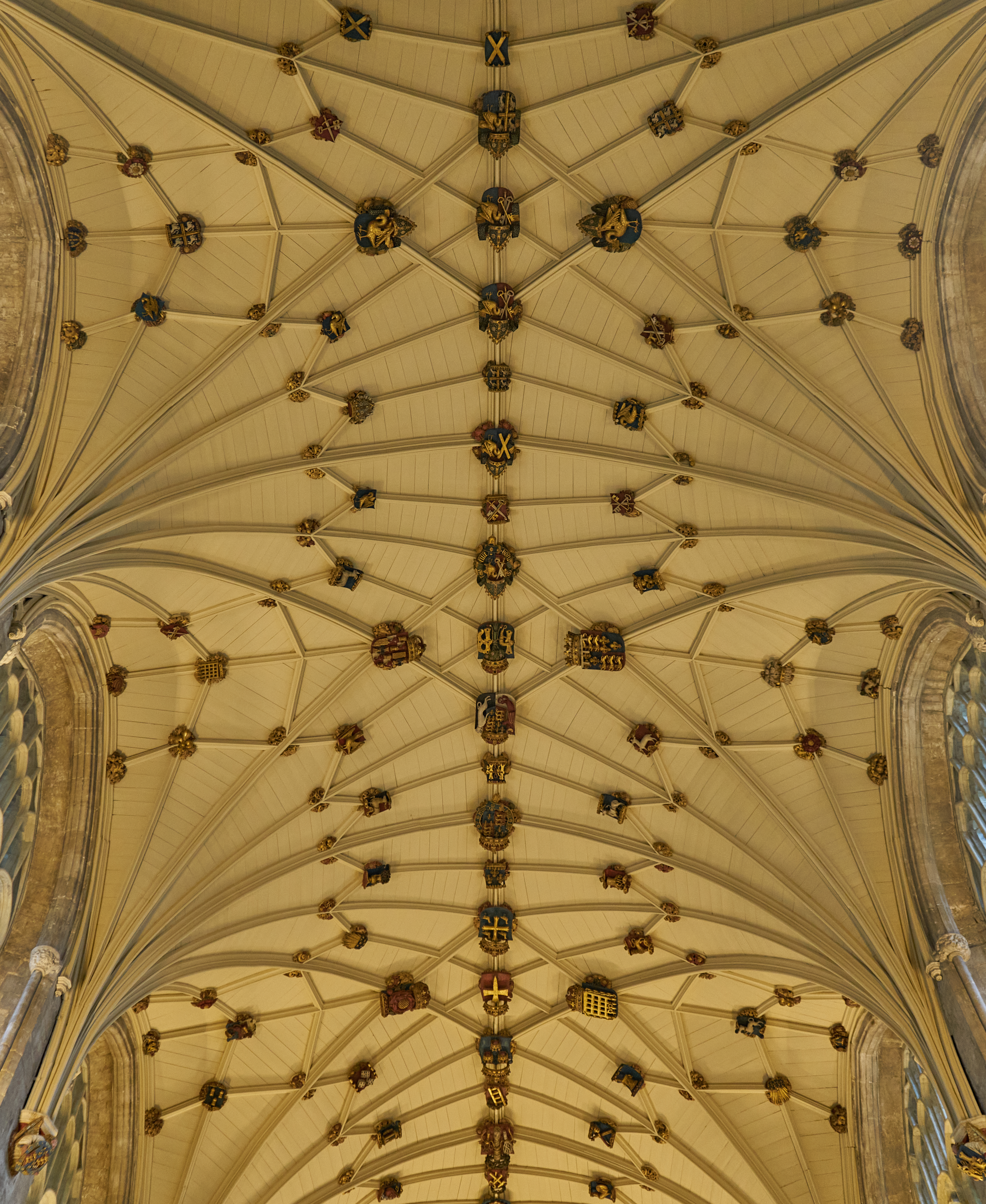
The same vault in November 2020, after restoration

As part of the works to restore the south transept ahead of its use as an exhibition space, a statue was discovered on its gable end in 2017. The original statue, made of Caen stone, was in a very poor state of repair. Caen stone was too soft as an external stone, especially on the exposed roof ridge on the south transept, where it is exposed to the prevailing wind. The head had sheared off at the neck and several cracks were found elsewhere in the statue. The plinth supporting the statue was also in very poor condition. Examination of the statue revealed it dated back to c. 1330 to 1352. Thanks to a grant from The Radcliffe Trust, the statue was replaced with a newly carved life-sized figure of a medieval ecclesiastic clad in an alb, made of Portland stone. By February 2017, the cathedral were only £200,000 short of their fundraising goal, which had increased to £20.5 million. Also in February, a pit was created in the south transept floor to allow future insertion of a lift, thus allowing the exhibition on the south transept triforium to be accessible to all. Eight piles were inserted to a depth of 16.4 metres (54 ft) below the floor to support the new lift.

In June 2017, the lift shaft and outer frame was installed, comprising 4 tonnes of steel rising 12.6 metres (41 ft) from the floor. To enable this, the 12th-century groin vault of the south transept aisle was opened up in a world first. The lift shaft is entirely free standing, it does not exert any pressure on the vault or walls. By November, the final clerestory window had been reinserted. They had been removed beginning 2015 for restoration and were sent to Wells, Somerset for restoration. The Great East Window was also restored in this time but was so fragile, the conservation works were completed in-situ. Just as these window repairs were completed, conservation on eight windows in the north transept began, including the oldest stained-glass window in the cathedral, dating from 1330. A new oak mezzanine floor was installed in the triforium to prevent visitors from walking on the uneven floor. The glass lift was installed in the frame during this time, comprising 18 panels, the largest weighing some 550 kilograms.

Starting in January 2018, the birdcage installed in 2014 was slowly removed due to the completion of the vault and window repairs, allowing the vault and windows to be viewed for the first time in nearly four years. The stone reredos, dating from 1450 to 1476, called the Great Screen, was cleaned for the first time since 1890.

The entire project came to a close on 21 May 2019, with the opening of the Kings and Scribes exhibition in the south transept, the removal of all internal and external scaffolding, and the reopening of the south transept, which had been closed off for five years, some two and a half years longer than originally expected.

==== Management crisis and resignations, 2024–25 ====
During Summer 2024, the cathedral entered into a period of disruption when it became clear that the resignation on 2 May of the long-serving director of music, Dr Andrew Lumsden, was not a decision he had made willingly. Lumsden’s departure was reported in the national press. Amidst negative reports concerning the management by the cathedral’s Chapter of their music department, the crisis deepened when it was announced on 18 June that the senior non-executive member of Winchester Cathedral Chapter, Mark Byford (a former head of the BBC World Service and its former deputy director-general) had resigned. The Bishop of Winchester, Philip Mounstephen, stepped in and commissioned a review.

The review was conducted by a partner at the law firm Winckworth Sherwood, Patti Russell, and a former Dean of Norwich, the Very Revd Jane Hedges, who interviewed 47 members of the cathedral community, and reviewed more than 140 submissions. Whilst the full report was not made public, the summary published in March 2025 stated that, on starting interviews in September 2024, the reviewers "immediately encountered stress and, in some cases, extreme pain at what had happened to the institution, to themselves and to other individuals caught up in the fall-out". Mistakes had been made by the leadership team at the cathedral through "misunderstandings ... poor judgement ... inadequate advice ... organisational culture ... and some simply due to individual personalities". There was "failure to appropriately manage people, including the management of poor performance, unacceptable behaviour and contractual changes", along with a "culture of secrecy, due to a misunderstanding of appropriate confidentiality and the aversion of key individuals to conflict". The reviewers recommended that the posts of Director of Music and Precentor (a position held by Canon Andrew Trenier since 2019) be restructured, and the music strategy be "revisited".

The Dean, Catherine Ogle, stepped down with immediate effect, apologising on behalf of the Chapter to "everyone who has been hurt by the events of the last few months". The Chapter, she said, had to accept "collective responsibility" but, as its leader, she was stepping back. On 13 July 2025, it was announced by the Acting Dean that "after six years the Revd Canon Andrew Trenier has concluded his tenure as Canon Precentor and Sacrist of Winchester Cathedral as of July 11, 2025".

== Architecture ==
Winchester Cathedral is one of the largest Gothic cathedrals in Northern Europe and the longest in overall length. The building shows the development of the architectural building styles from the dramatic Norman work of the transepts, right through to the late Perpendicular Gothic work in the east end. The present building was begun in 1079 and was completed in 1532. It has a cruciform plan, with a long nave, transepts, central crossing tower, choir, presbytery and lady chapel. A variety of stone was used to build the cathedral, including Quarr limestone from the Isle of Wight, Bath stone or Oolite reused from demolished Old Minster, Caen stone from Normandy, ashlar, Beer stone and Purbeck Marble. The cathedral is 558 feet (170 m) long, and the vaulting has a height of 78 feet (24 m). The central tower is 150 feet (46 m) high.

The north and south transepts are the oldest unaltered sections of the present cathedral, constructed under the auspices of Bishop Walkelin from 1079 to 1098. They are massive in construction, some 209 feet (64 m) in length across the crossing and the walls are 75 feet (23 m) high. The transepts are divided into three sections of nearly equal height, featuring an arcade at ground level, triforium and clerestory. Both transepts have east and west aisles, each of which contains a small chapel. The windows in the transepts are mostly Norman, except for the clerestory and south gable of the south transept, which has had Decorated Gothic windows inserted, including a small rose window. The south transept aisle vault was pierced in the 2012–2020 restoration (see above) to allow installation of a lift up to the triforium.

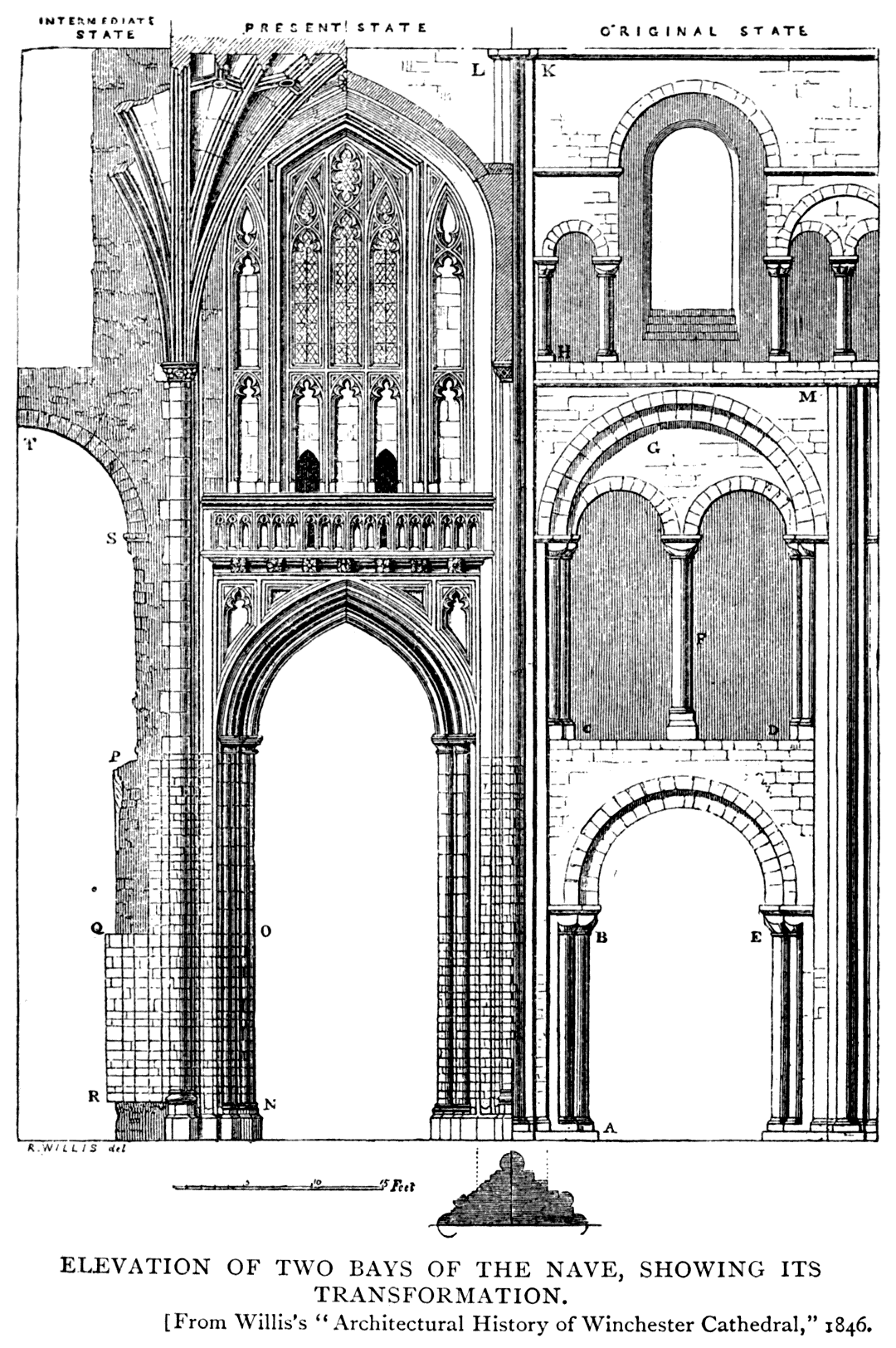
Nave cross section showing how it was transformed from Norman (right) to Gothic (left)

The central tower, which rises only one story above the steeply pitched roof of the nave, was rebuilt in the Norman style following its collapse in 1107. There are indications it was originally intended to be higher, the interior of the belfry stage is highly decorative, featuring dog-tooth carvings, which additionally indicates it was intended to be a lantern stage, potentially with a belfry stage above. Whether a further stage was planned or not is unknown, but a wooden fan vault was installed in 1635 to allow the installation of bells above, thus closing the upper stages of the tower off to the cathedral below. Underneath the tower is the choir, separated from the nave by a large and intricate wooden screen dating from the 1870s, by George Gilbert Scott. Behind the screen are the choir stalls and misericords, some of which date back to 1308, and are made out of carved oak.

The nave, originally built between c.1100 and c.1129, was remodelled into the Perpendicular Gothic style from 1346 to 1420, keeping much of the original Norman work by encasing it in new stone, and remastering the elevations, merging the previous three-tier structure as in the transepts into two. It is amongst the widest Gothic naves in the country and the longest nave of its kind in Europe. The nave has a spectacular stone vault, complete with hundreds of bosses. The nave aisles are also vaulted in stone and are rather narrow by comparison to the central nave, which gives both an impression of width and height. The nave, including the aisles, is 82 feet (25 metres) wide.

The east end of the cathedral was built in two stages. The older section is the retroquire between the high altar and the lady chapel, which was constructed between 1202 and c. 1220 in the Early English Gothic style. This too has a stone vault, with numerous highly decorative chantry chapels of the various bishops of the age. It was said to have been used as a model for Salisbury Cathedral, whose construction began just as the retroquire at Winchester was nearing completion. When this work was completed at Winchester, the original Norman apse was demolished. There are two great arches in the western wall of the retroquire, which allow the view of the rear of the reredos to be seen. The retroquire is unusual in that the central bays are only slightly higher than the aisles that surround them. The aisles are lit with large lancet windows.

The newer section of the east end is the presbytery east of the crossing and was built in the Perpendicular Gothic style from 1458 to 1520, It consists of four bays, with north and south aisles. Like the remodelled nave, this features two stages, rather than the three seen in the north and south transepts, the difference being the windows in the presbytery are larger than their counterparts in the nave. Unlike the nave, however, the presbytery is vaulted in wood, painted to look like stone. The vault has some of the most highly decorative and colourful roof bosses in the cathedral. The Lady Chapel was also greatly extended in this time during the time of Bishop Courtenay (1486–1492), given new bays to the east, with a large seven-light window. The vaulting of the western bay, which dates back to the time of the retroquire, was also redone during Courtenay's time, which now features extremely intricate lierne star vaults. The southeast chapel of the retroquire, adjoining the lady chapel, was also remodelled at this time, mostly by Courtenay's successor Thomas Langton, who gave it a pseudo fan vault and painted the vaulting blue. Unlike the rest of the cathedral, the coloured vault survives.

Underneath the cathedral is the crypt, an extensive Norman survivor, which extends underneath much of the eastern end of the building. The crypt has numerous sections and aisles. The crypt has a stone vault throughout and dates from the late 11th century, similar in date to the transepts. There is a prominent statue in the crypt by Antony Gormley of a life-sized man, which has stood in the crypt since the 1980s. The crypt often floods in winter due to the high water table.

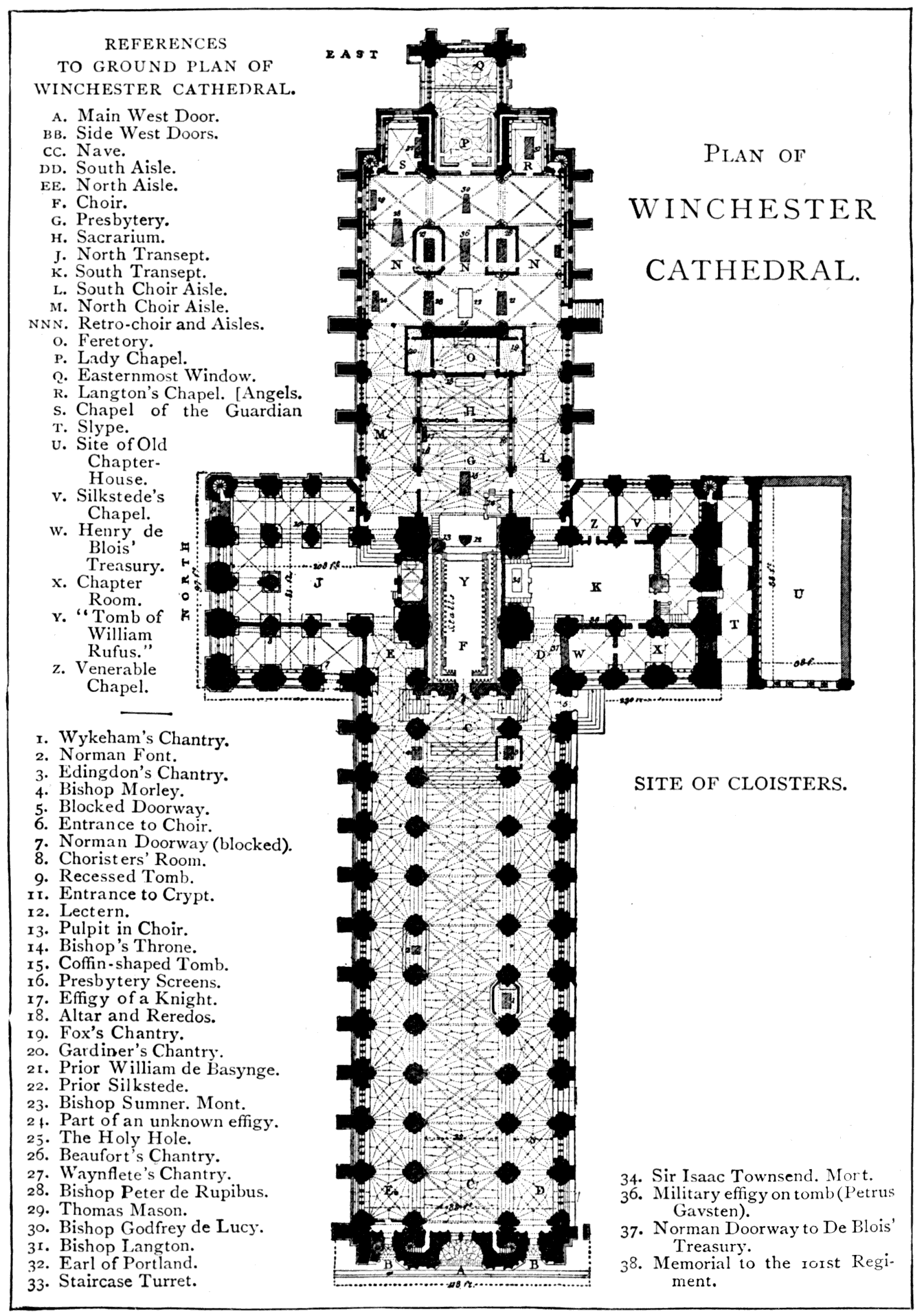
Plan of the Cathedral

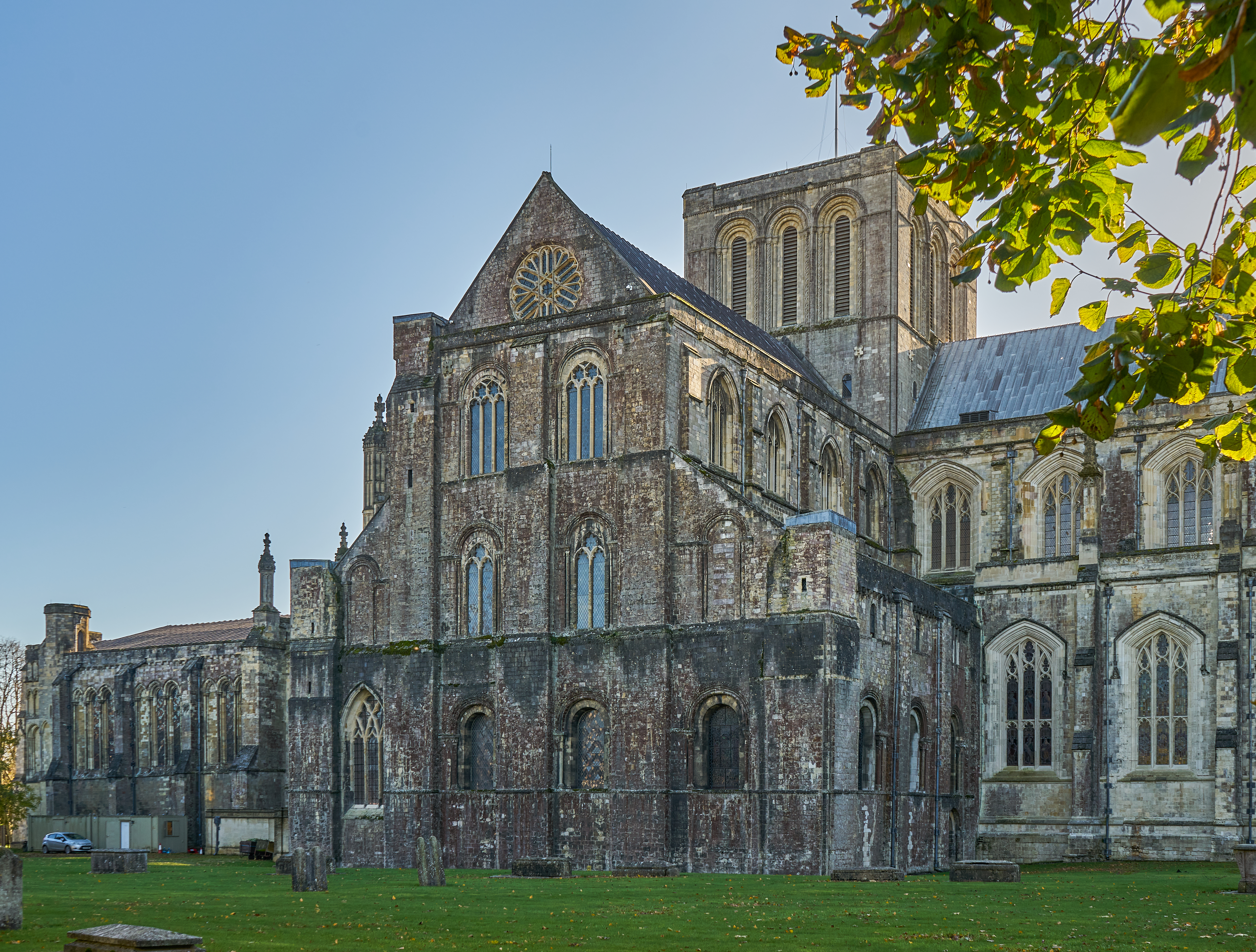
Norman central tower and north transept

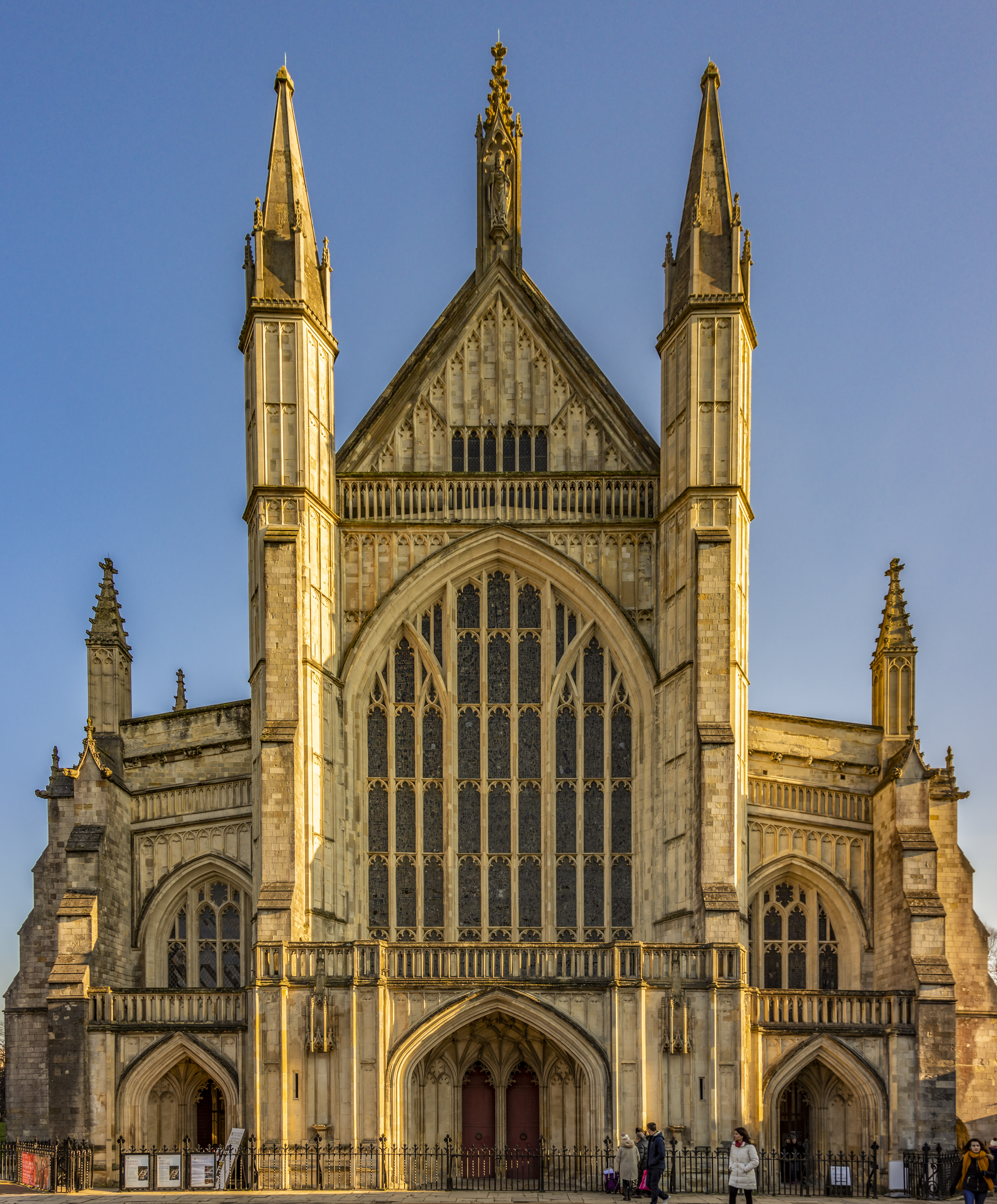
Bishop Edington's west façade

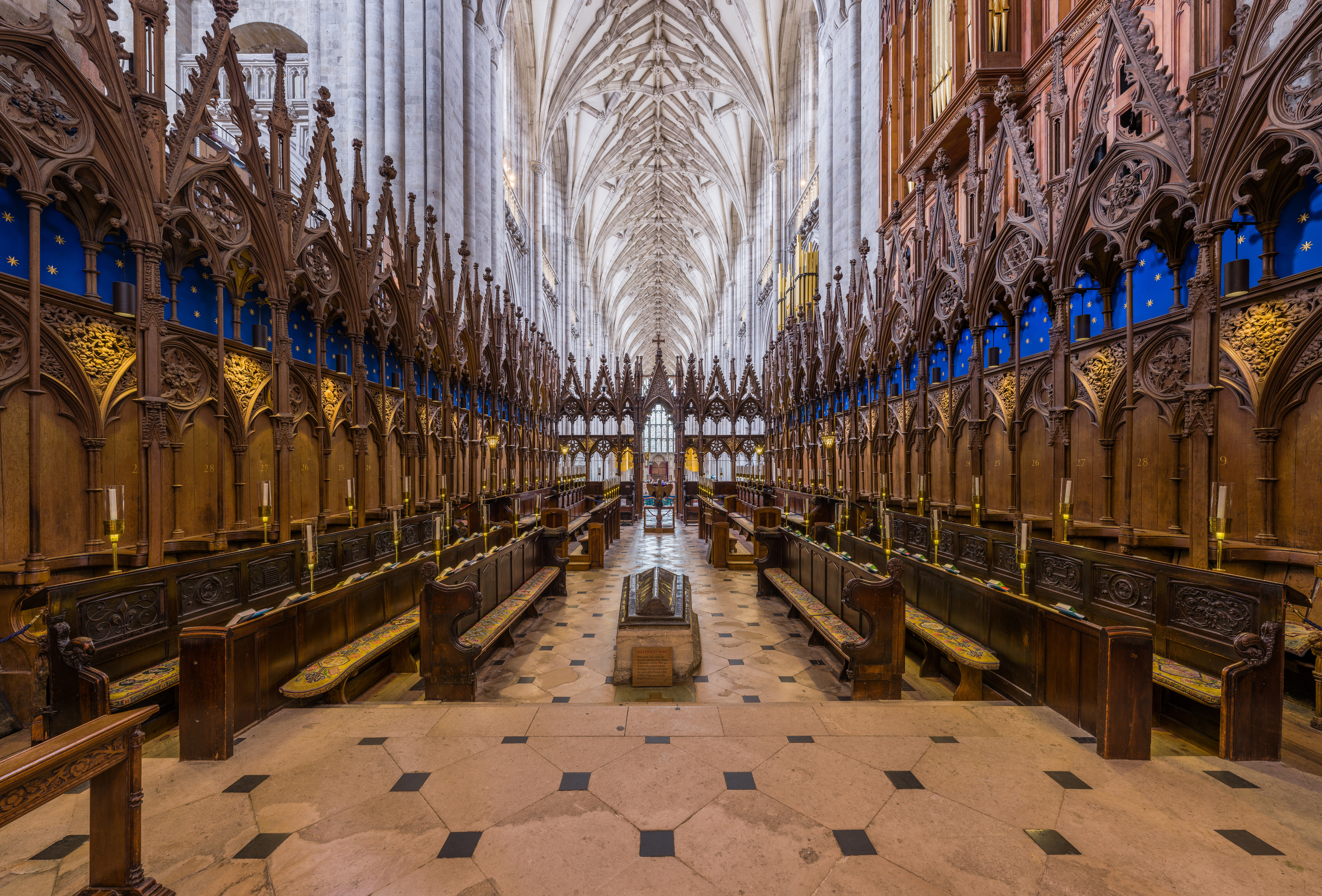
Choir stalls and screen

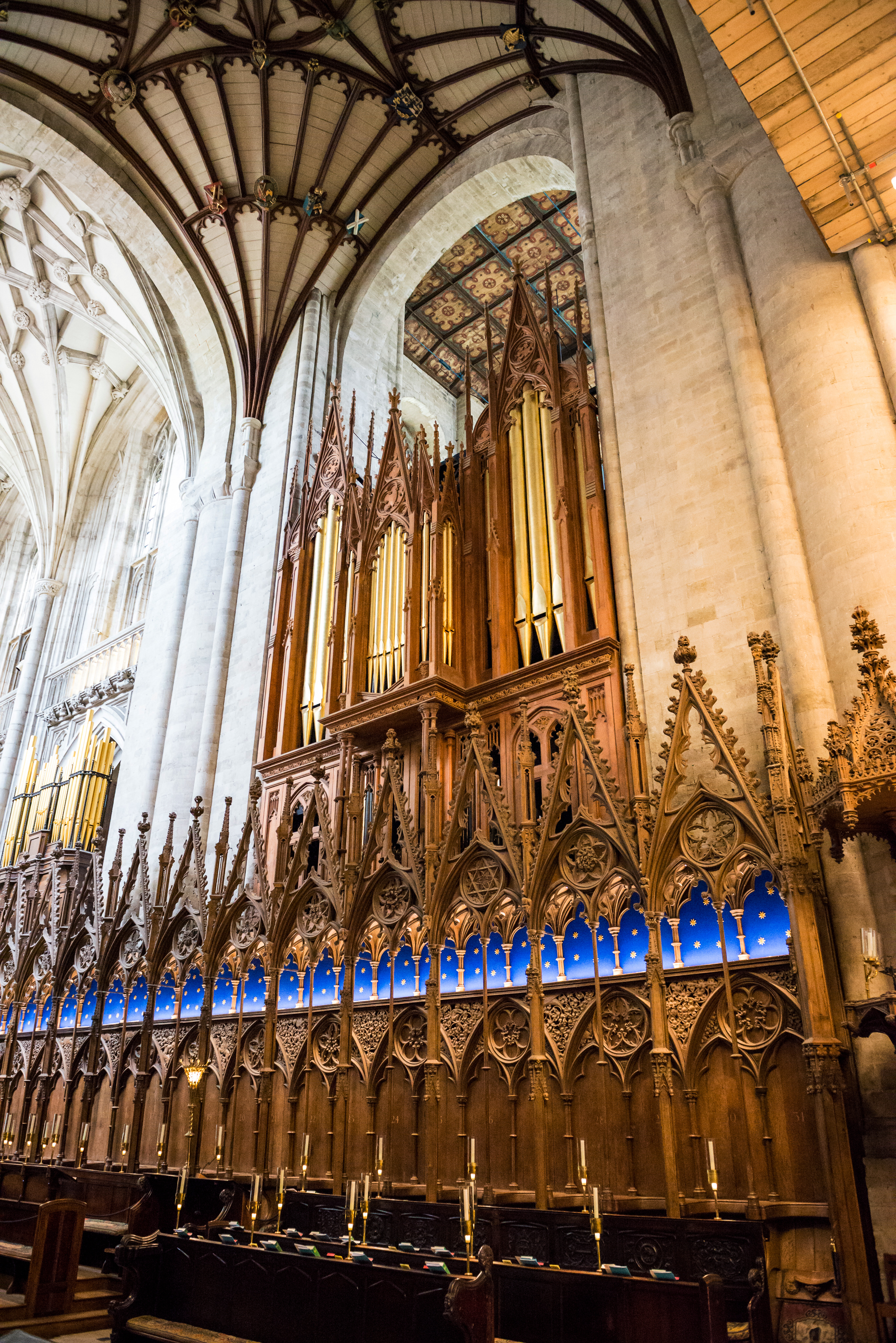
Choir stalls canopy, organ, tower arch and fan vault

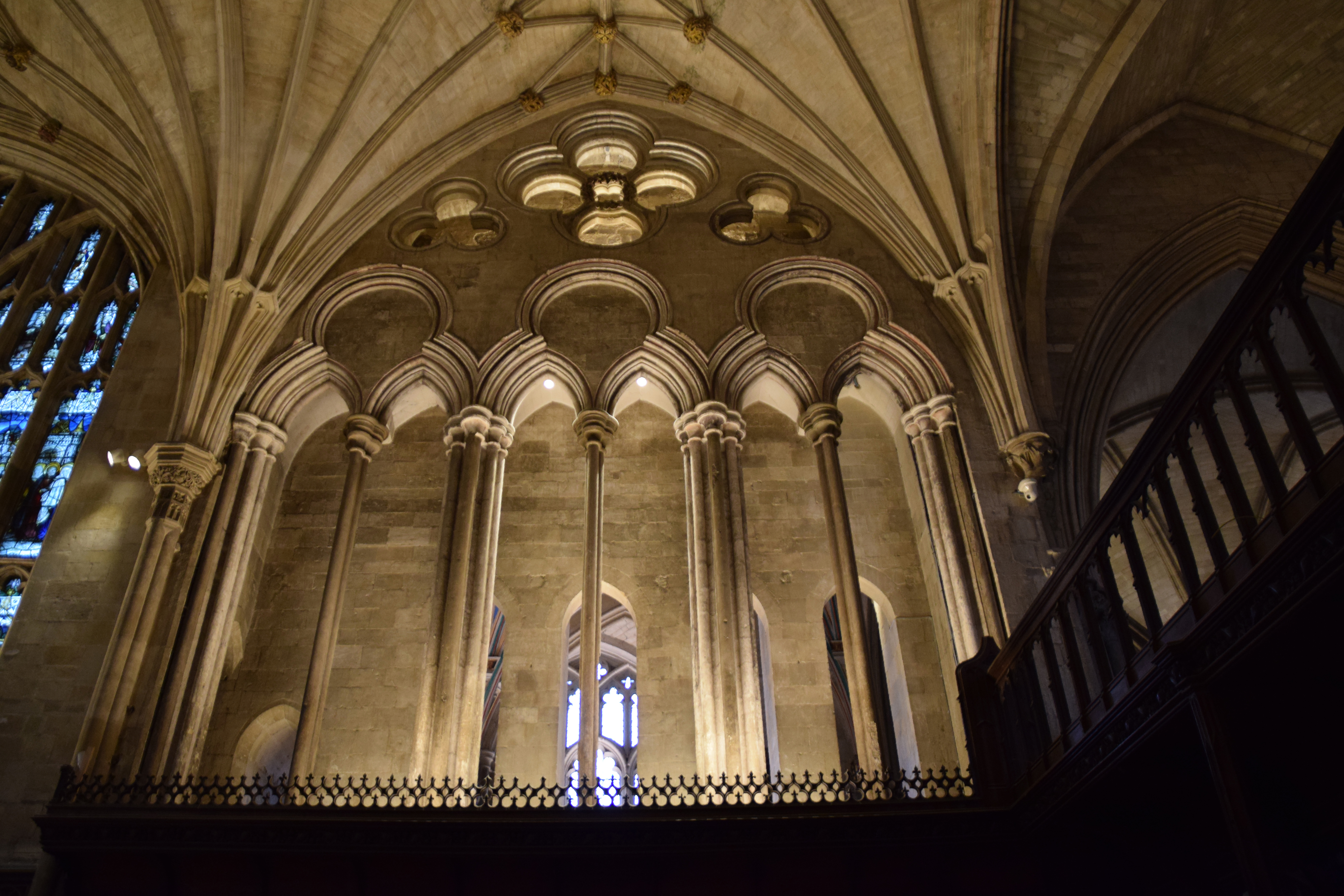
Detail on Lady Chapel

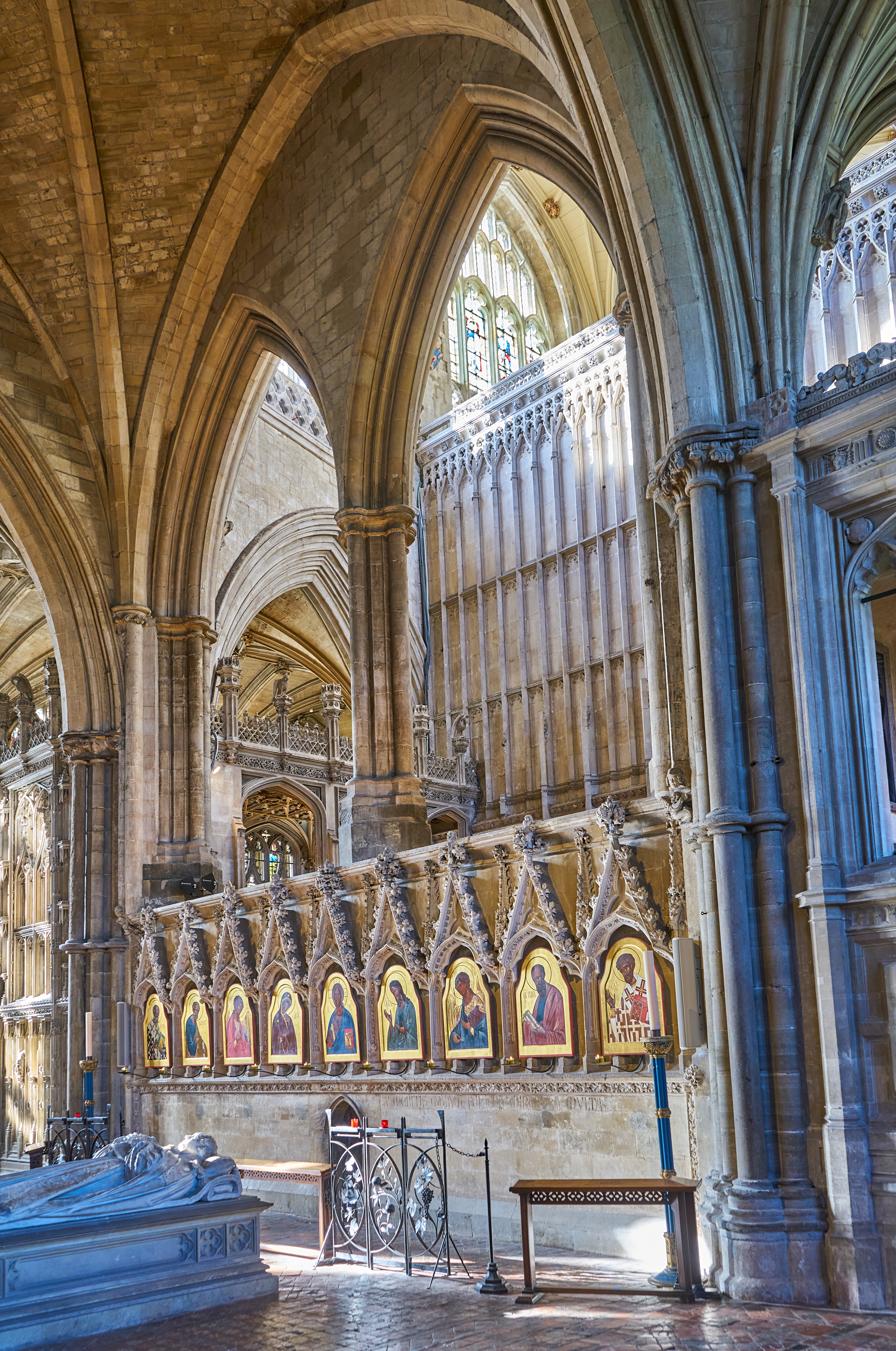
Arches cut into the retroquire

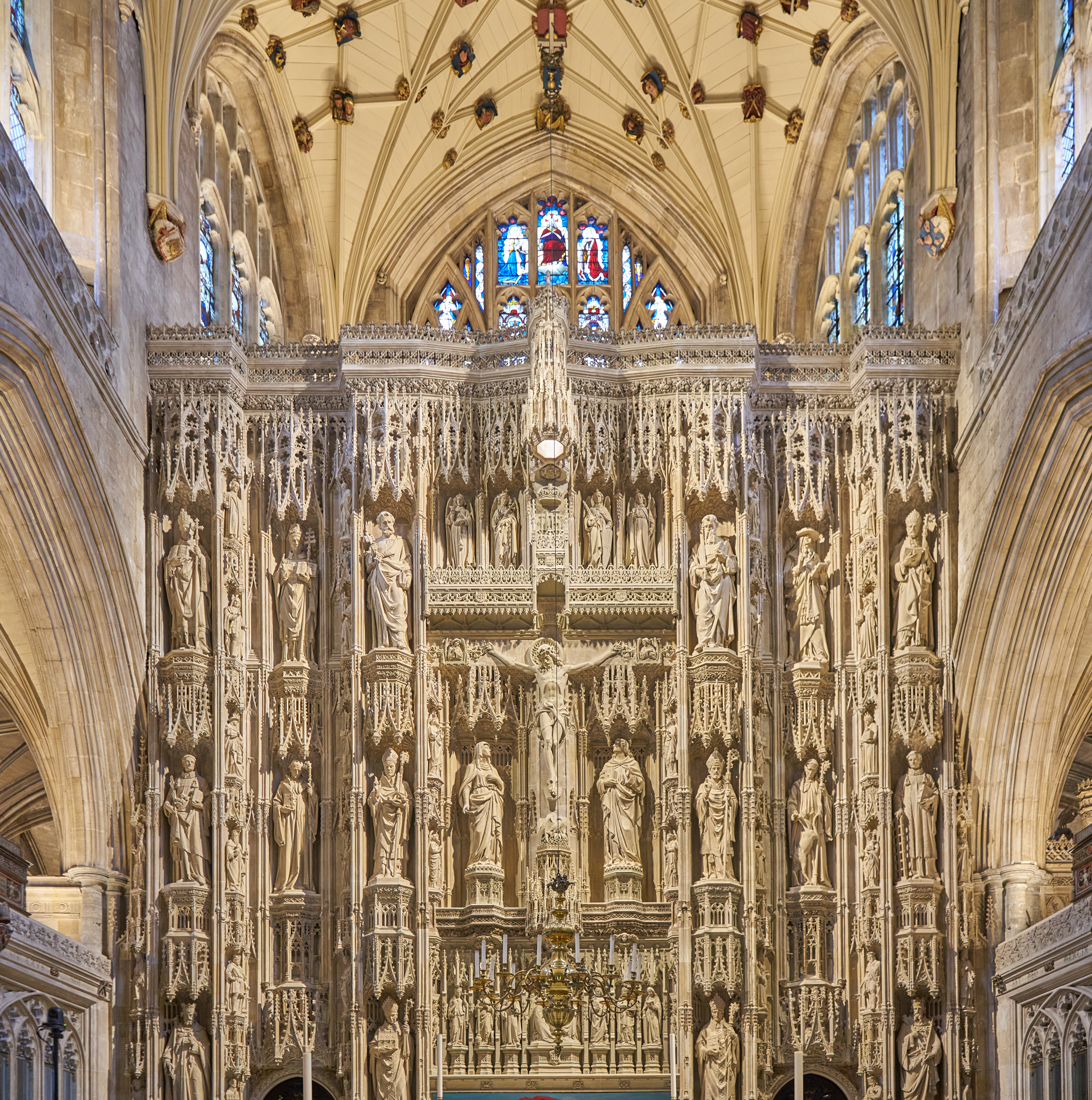
Reredos and Great Screen – 1450 to 1476

=== Stained glass ===
Much of Winchester's stained glass was lost during the time of Oliver Cromwell as Lord Protector when the enormous Great West Window was smashed by Roundheads, as were many other windows in the lower levels of the building. The glass from the Great West Window was put back together with clear glass as a mosaic following the restoration.

As such, most of the surviving stained glass is in the upper levels of the cathedral, such as in the Great East Window, which was restored as part of the 2012–2020 restoration. The great east window dates from 1620s, and contains the work of Flemish craftsmen, whose work can also be seen in King's College Chapel in Cambridge. Much of the glass in the presbytery clerestory dates from 1404 to 1426, and was made by Thomas of Oxford. There is also a rose window in the gable of the north transept. The oldest stained-glass window in the cathedral is in the north transept, dating from 1330.

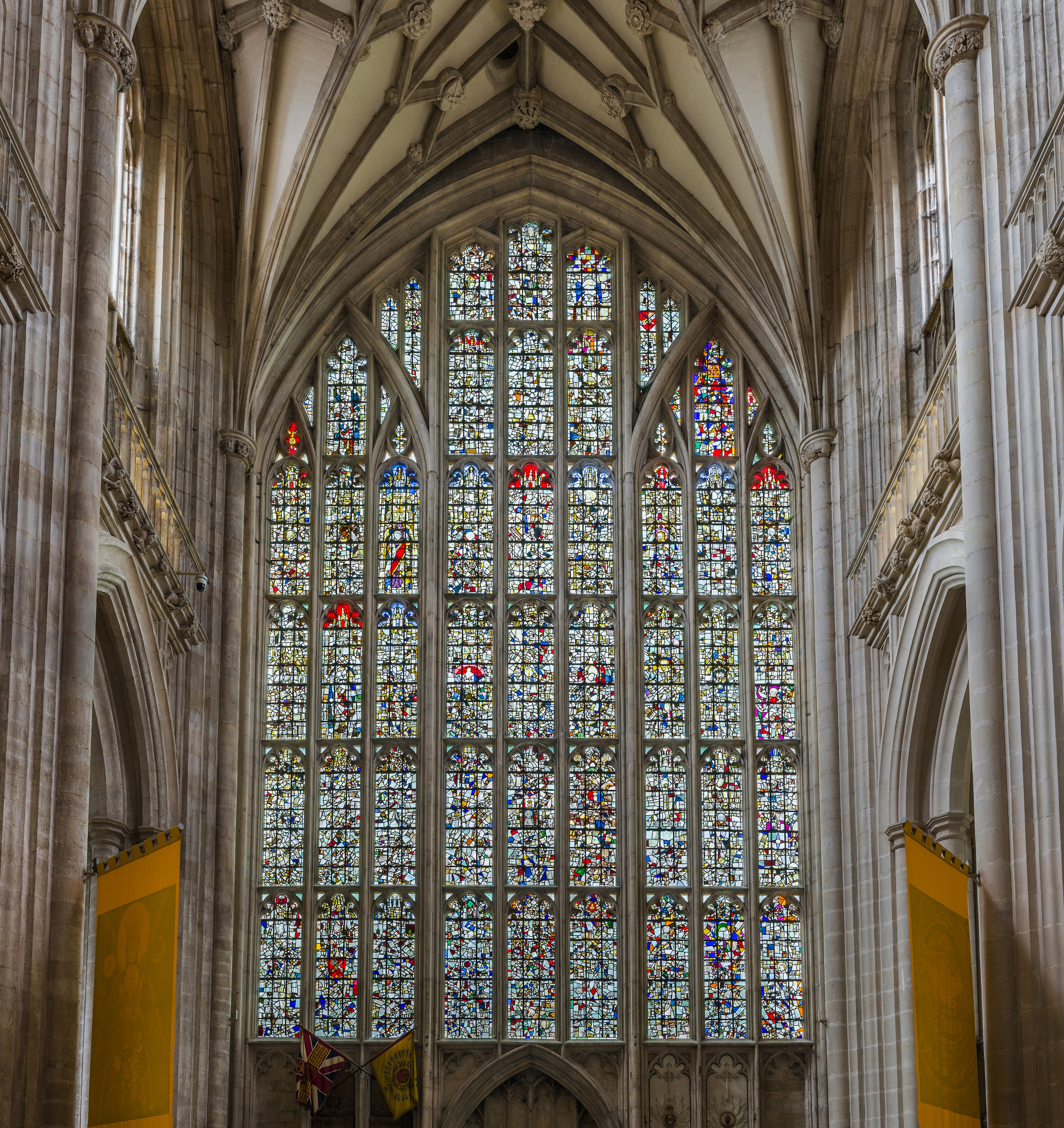
The Great West Window, now a mosaic

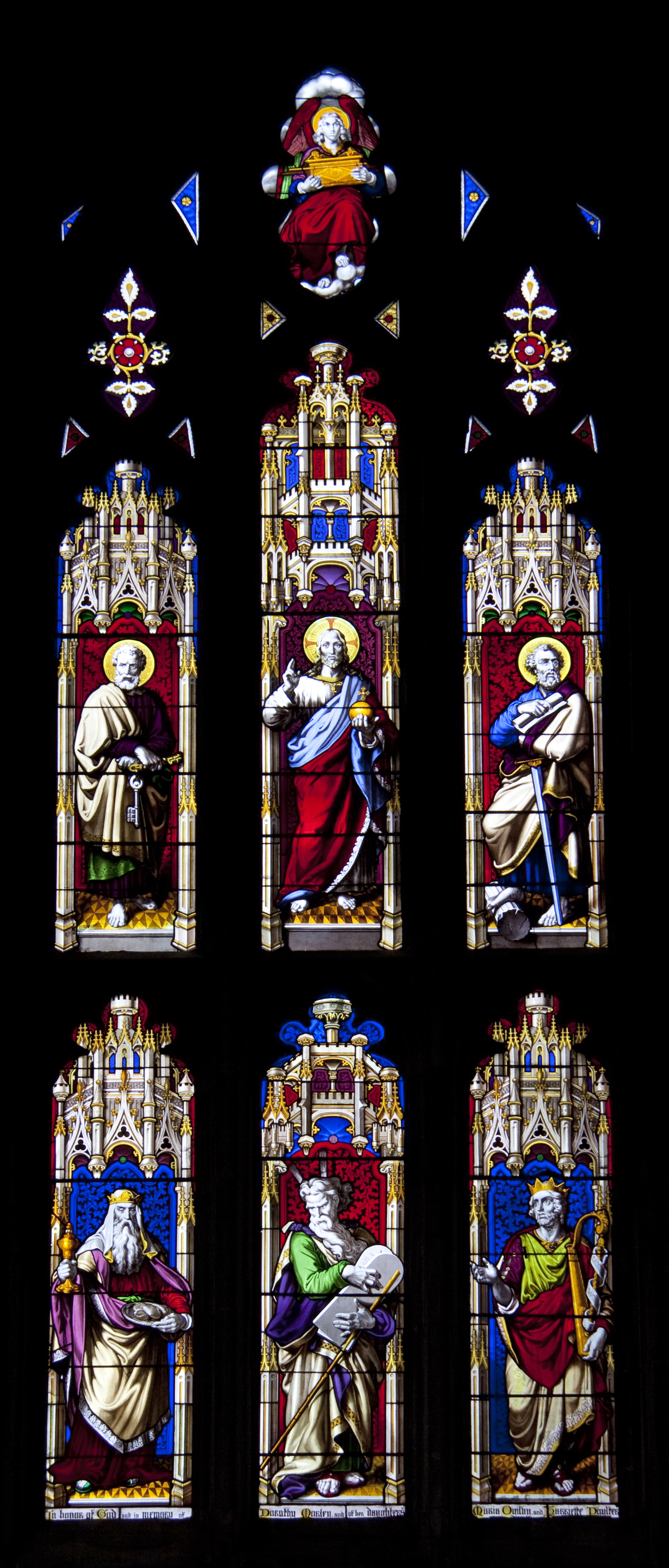
Stained glass in one of the clerestory windows of the nave

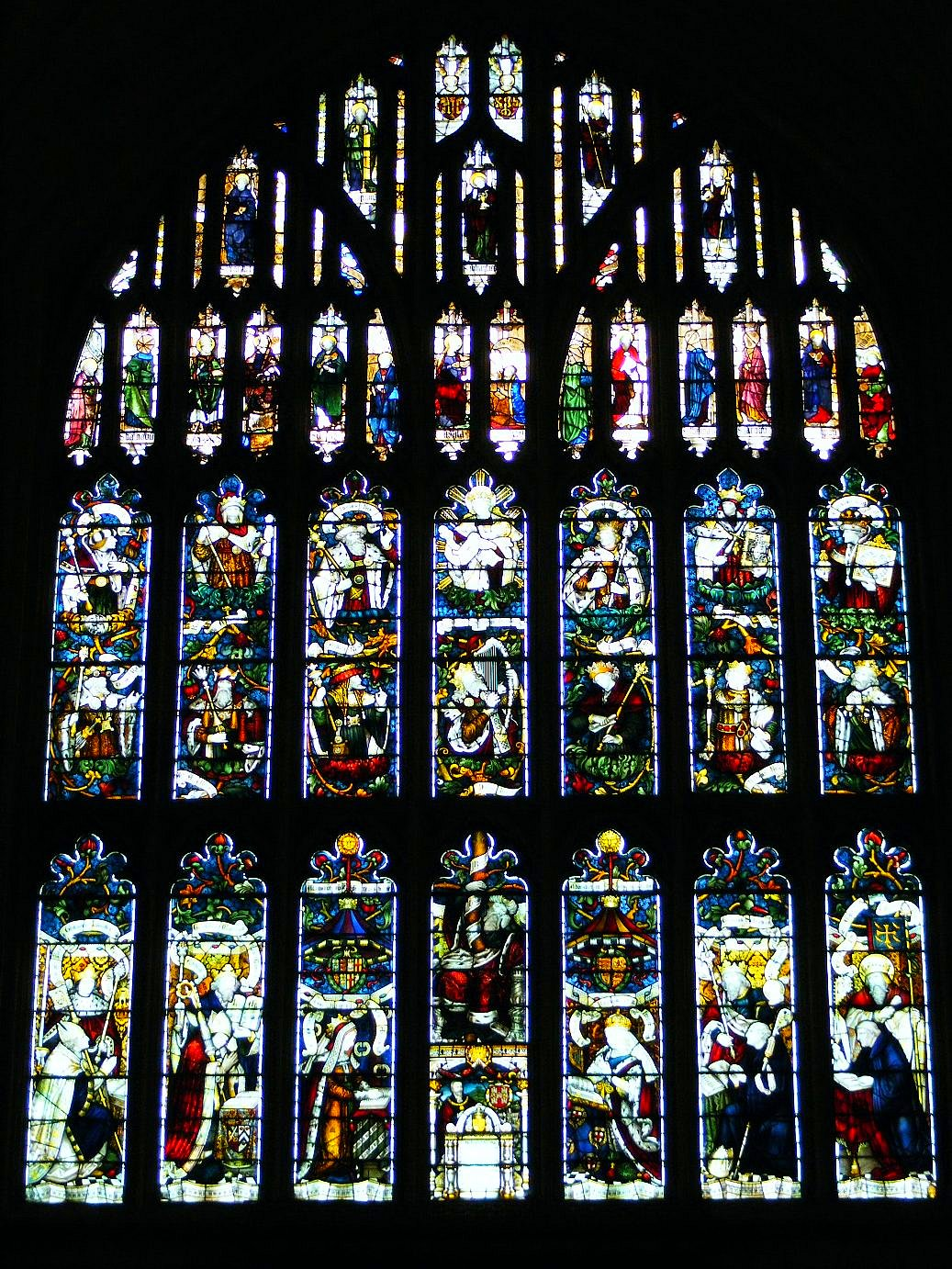
Lady chapel window

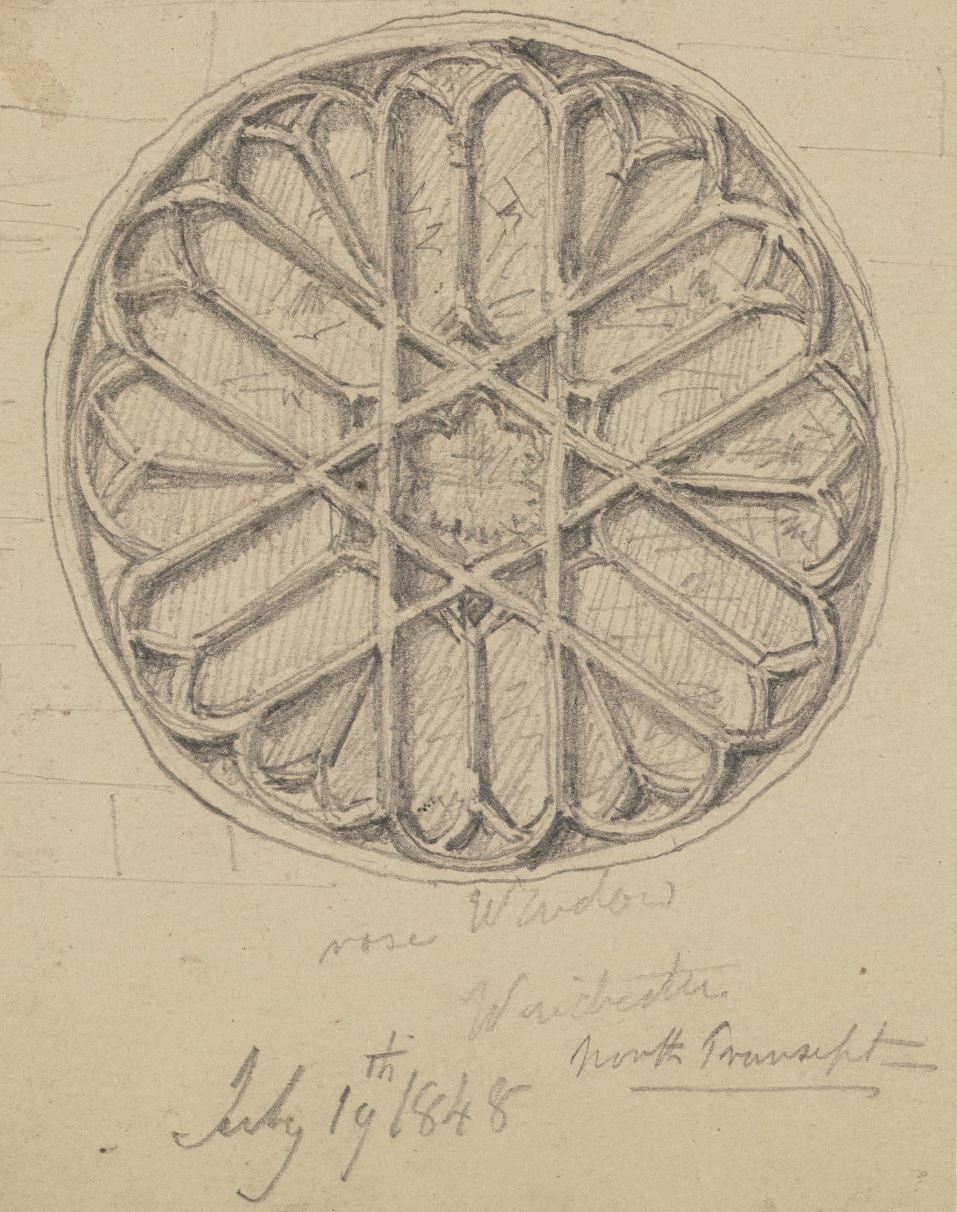
An engraving of the north transept rose window

=== Vaults ===
Much of the cathedral building is vaulted, some using stone and other parts, wood. The oldest vaulted part of the building is the 11th-century crypt, which is vaulted in stone throughout. The nave and aisles are vaulted using Beer stone. The aisles of the presbytery, the lady chapel and the retroquire are also vaulted in stone. The vaulting underneath the central tower and spanning the presbytery is vaulted in wood, painted to look like stone. Many of the chantry chapels have fan vaults. The highest vault in the cathedral is 78 feet (24 metres) above ground level. The transepts are not vaulted except for in the aisles, instead, they have 19th-century wooden ceilings.

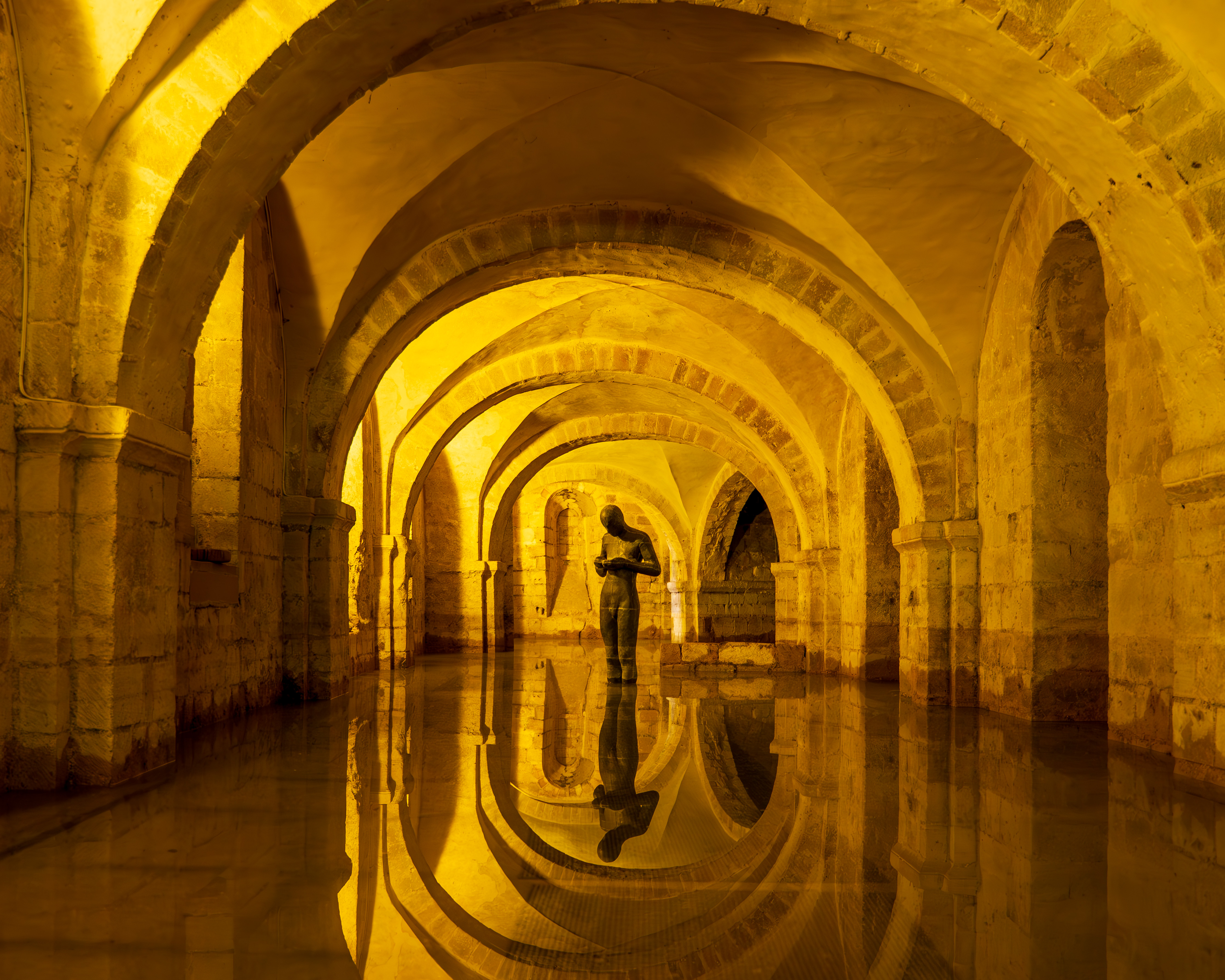
Antony Gormley's Sound II in Winchester Cathedral's crypt whilst partially flooded.

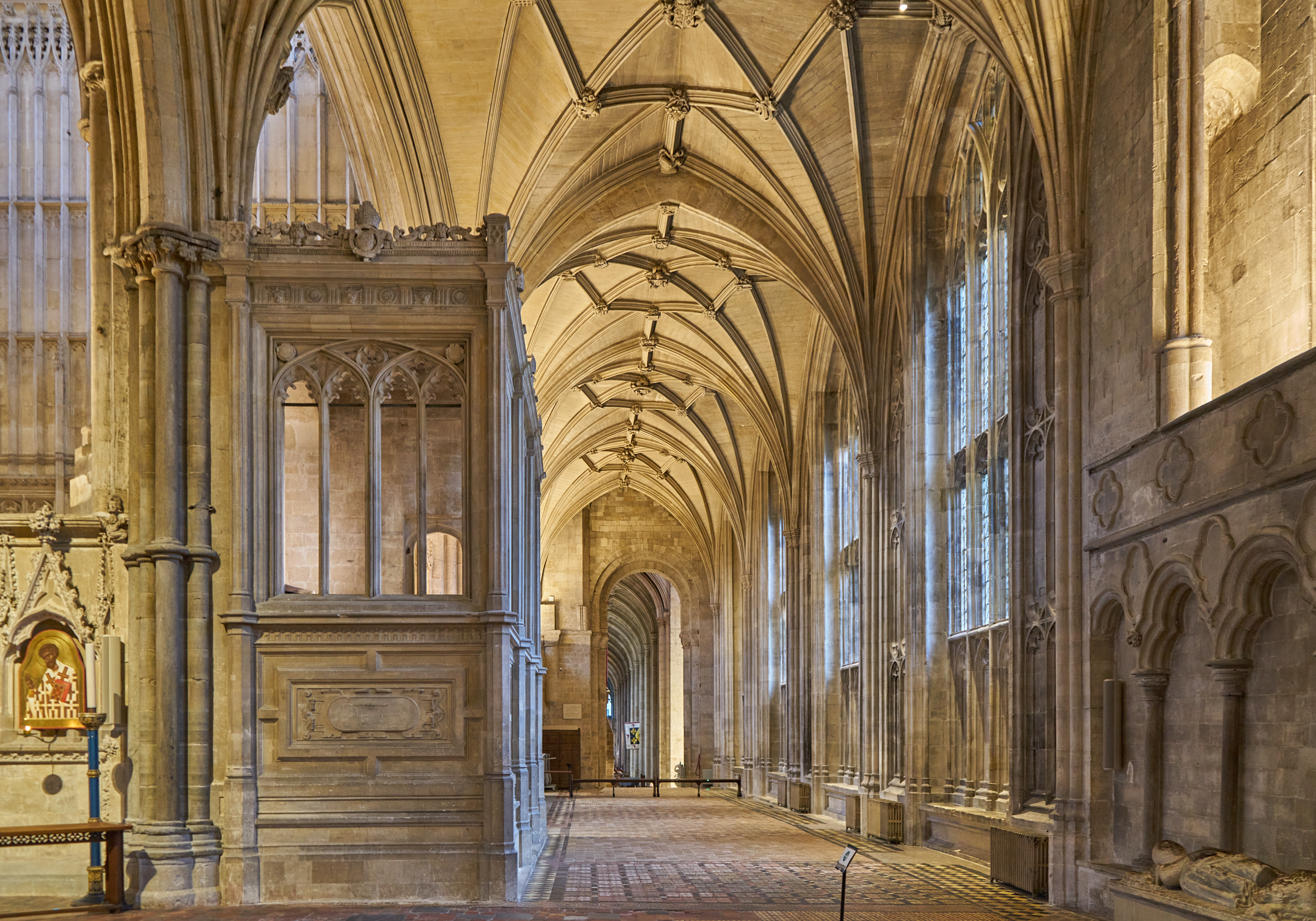
Early English vault in the aisles of the presbytery

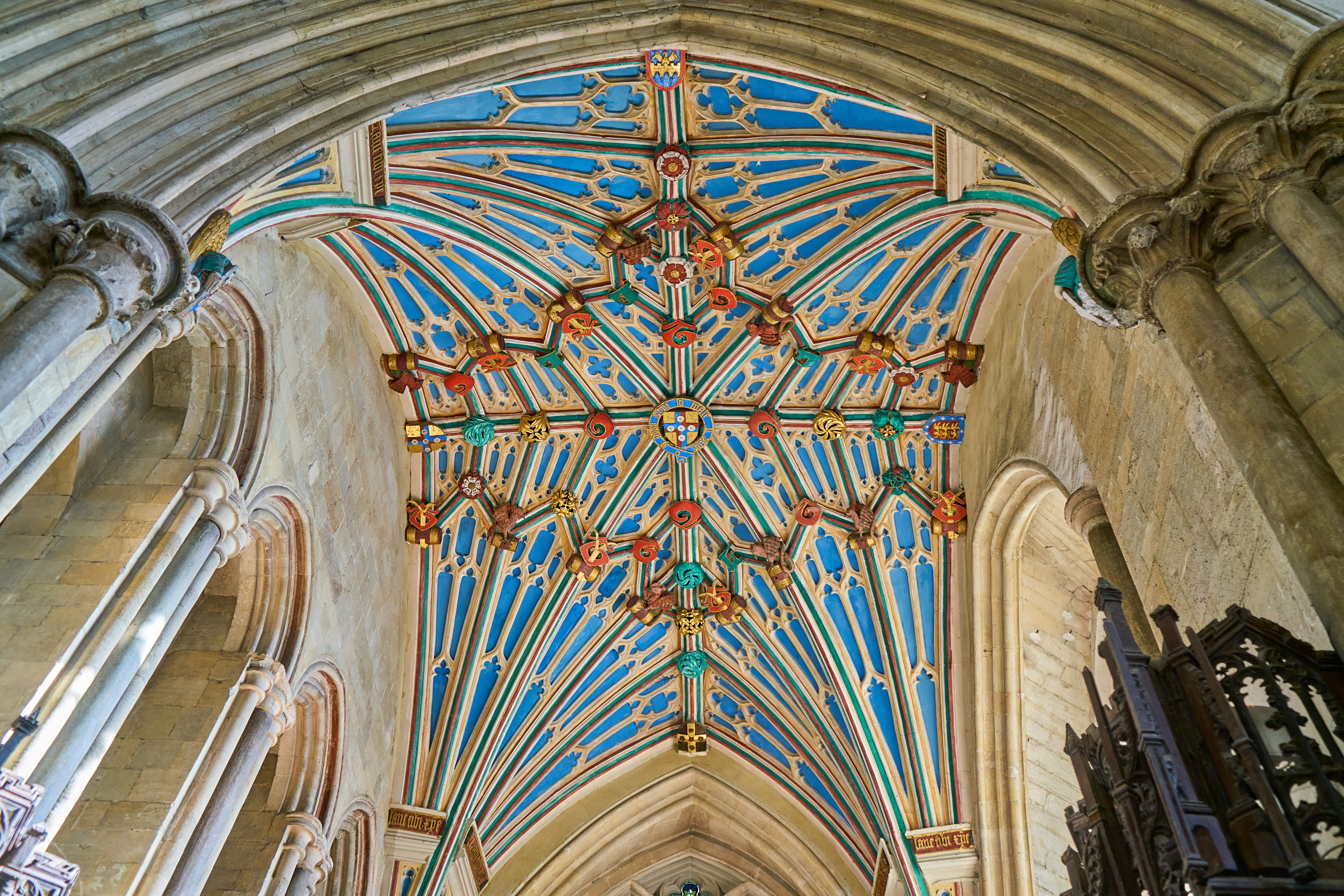
Blue pseudo fan vault of the SE chapel of the retroquire

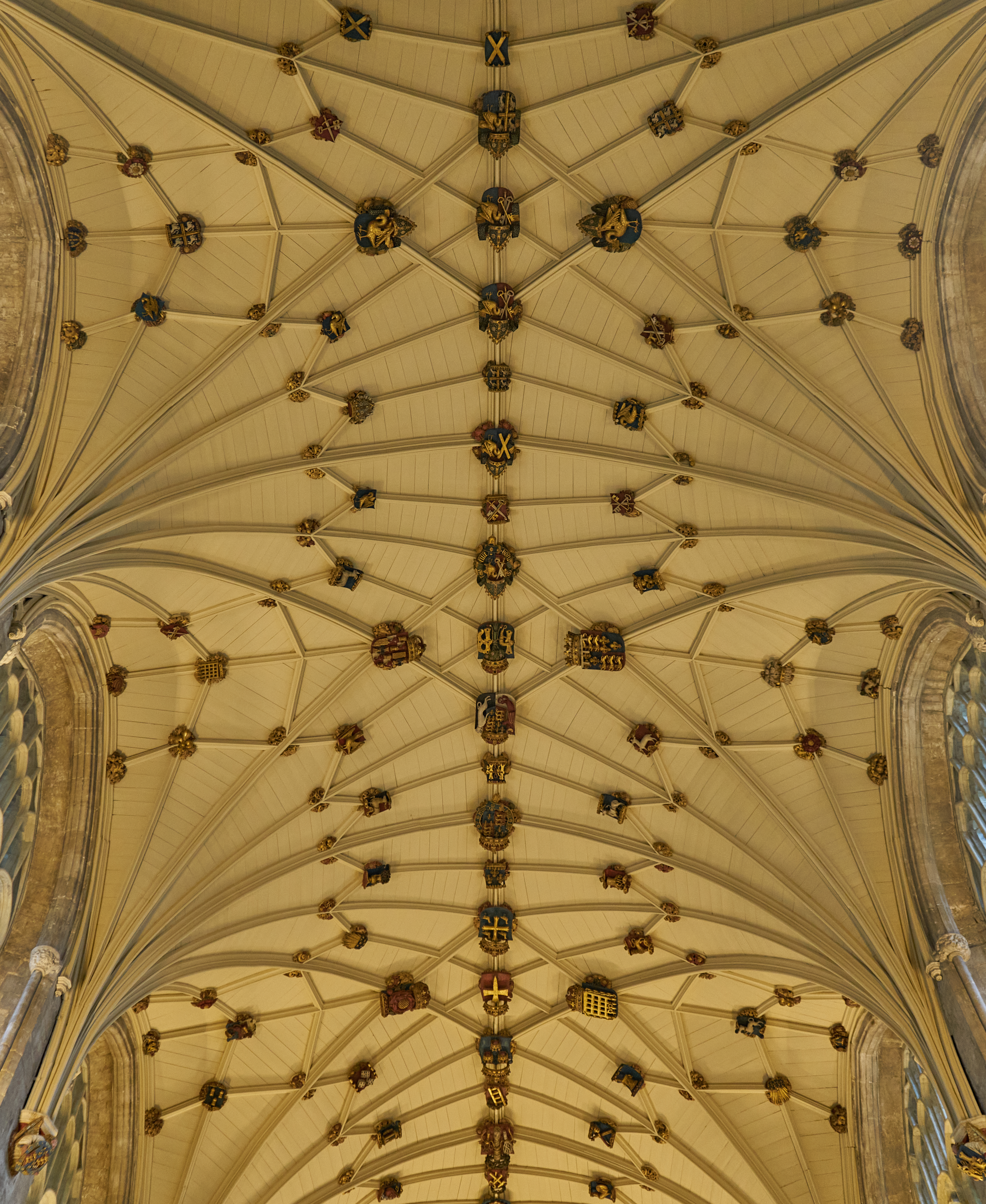
Late perpendicular Gothic vault of the presbytery

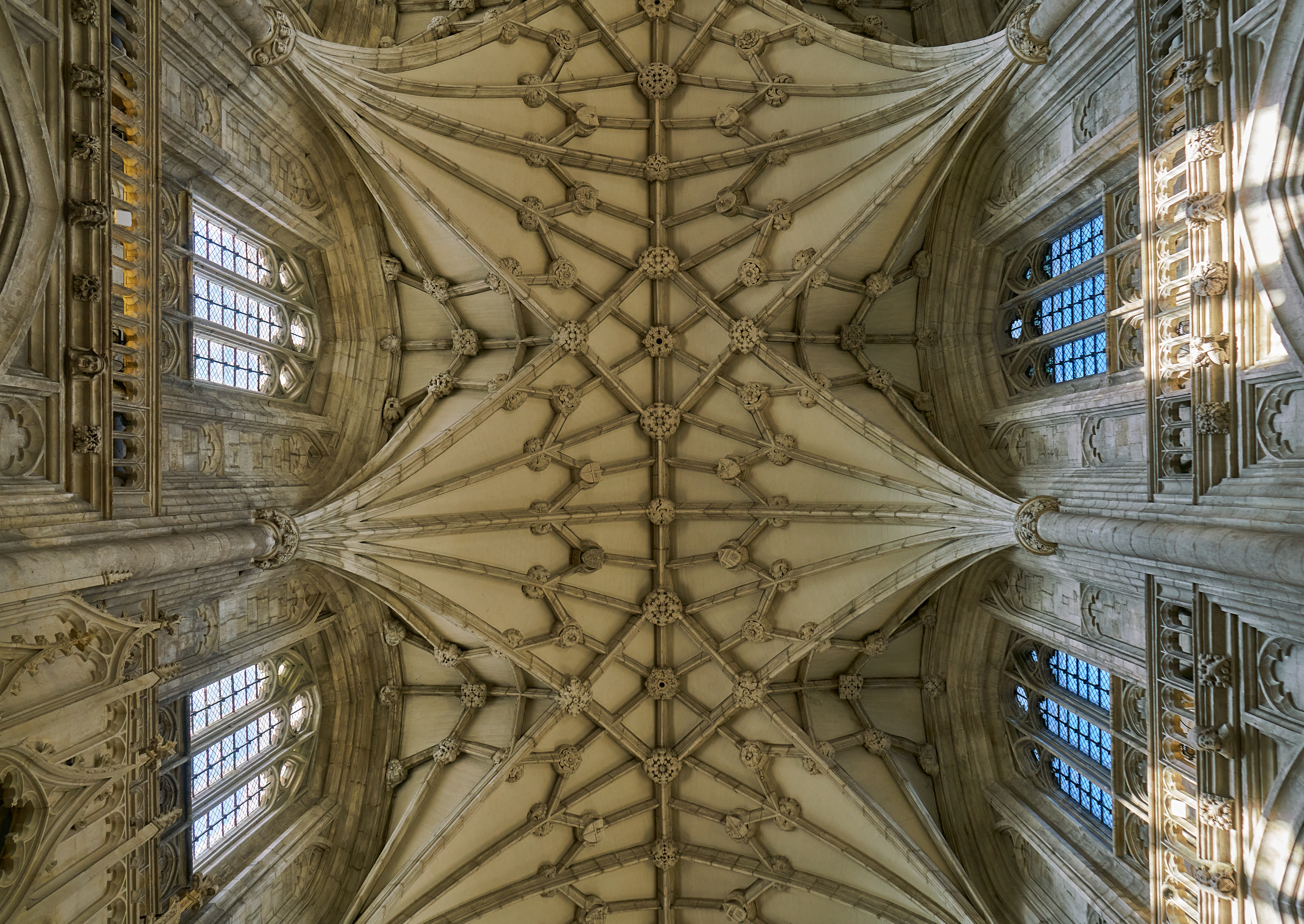
Vaulting in the nave, early Perpendicular

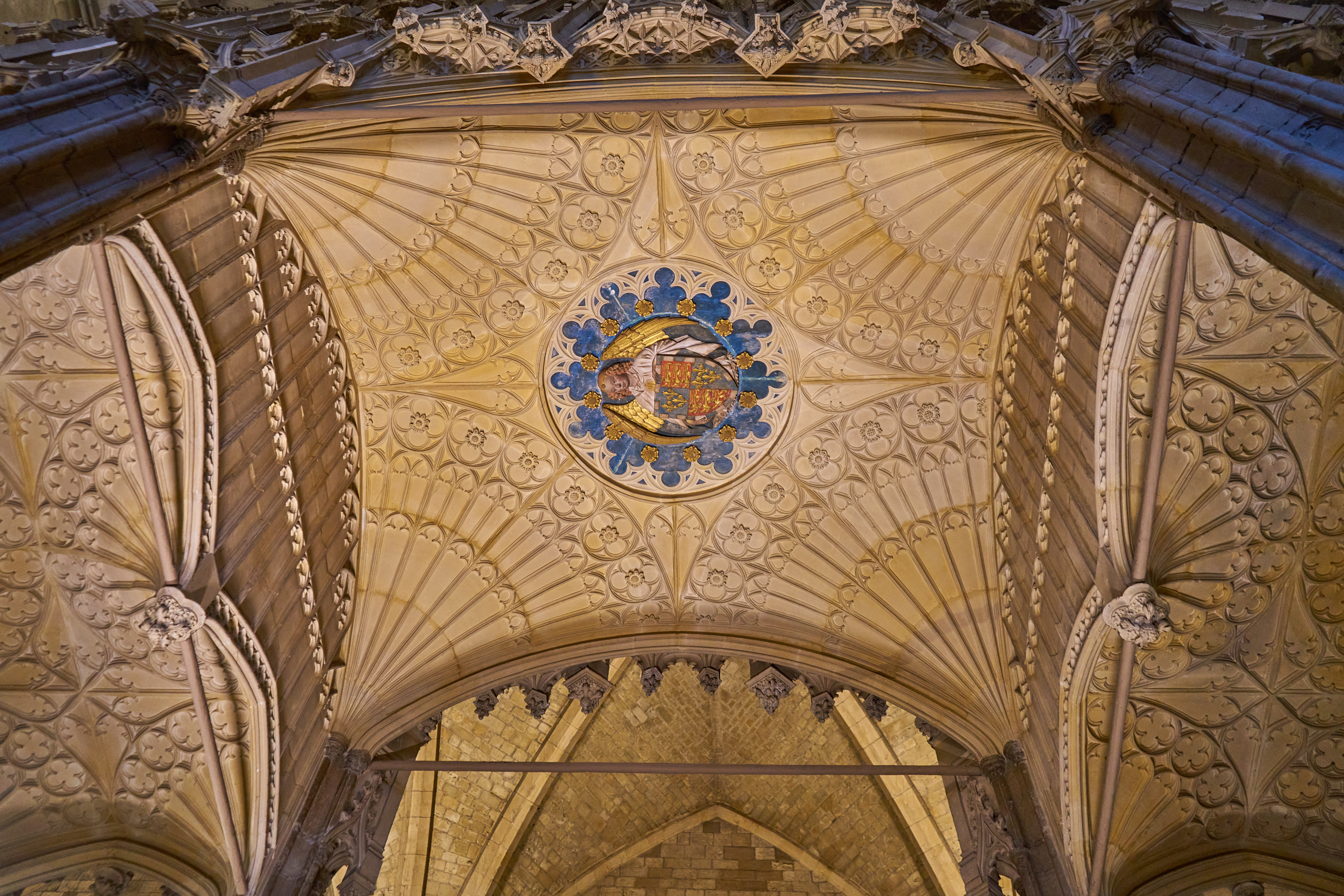
Fan vault in one of the chantry chapels of the retroquire

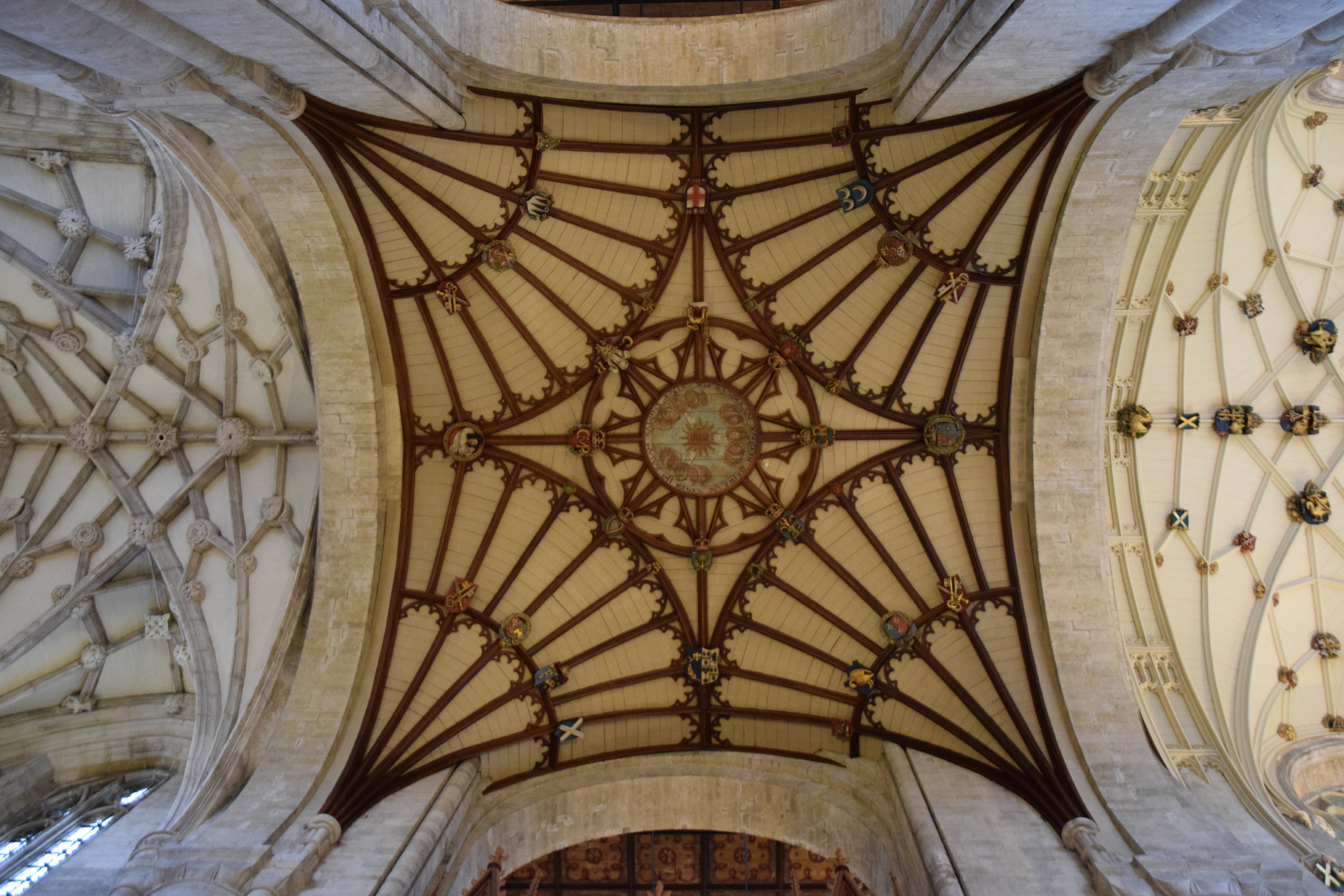
Wooden fan vault underneath the tower, 1635

=== Monuments and treasures ===
The cathedral has numerous monuments and treasures. These include the 12th-century Tournai font, the Morley Library, the Kings and Scribes exhibition and the Winchester Bible. The font is a rare survivor from a collection known as the Tournai fonts and dates back to c. 1150. It is one of only ten fonts of its kind in England. The font weighs 1.5 tonnes and is made from Carboniferous limestone from Belgium. It features unique carvings of the healings of Saint Nicholas. The font was gifted to the cathedral by Henry of Blois.

The Morley Library, housed in the triforium of the south transept, houses a collection of rare books, all of which were given to the cathedral by George Morley, Bishop of Winchester from 1662 to 1684. The books still rest on their original 17th-century carved shelves.

The Kings and Scribes exhibition is the culmination of a £20.5 million restoration of the transepts and east end, and displays hundreds of ancient artefacts, including skulls, weaponry and building stone, all displayed alongside 21st-century technology. Also in the exhibition is the famous Winchester Bible, which is considered to be the largest and best-preserved 12th-century Bible in England. The text, in the Latin of St Jerome, was handwritten on 468 sheets of calf-skin parchment, each measuring 23 by 15.75 inches (584 by 400 mm). These sheets were folded down the centre, making 936 pages in all. The illustrations in the Bible sometimes used lapis lazuli which was both rare and extremely expensive, coming from Afghanistan. Other illustrations contain gold leaf or paint. The Bible is on display for the public to view as part of the Kings and Scribes exhibition, and is kept in a climate-controlled room on the ground floor of the south transept. The physical book cannot be read by the public, but it has been replicated digitally, and visitors can use large screens to read the digitised Bible.

The cathedral also has a very large number of ancient mortuary chests, including those of Alfred the Great, King Canute and his wife Queen Emma, William Rufus and King Egbert. The remains of these individuals were originally interred in the Old Minster, chief burial place of the Wessex ruling dynasty, but they are believed to have been transferred to Winchester's Norman cathedral after the minster was demolished in 1093 to make way for the new construction. Their bones were placed in chests, but these were heavily disturbed during the English Civil War, and the remains are today commingled, with several individuals found within each chest, and some individuals spread over multiple boxes.

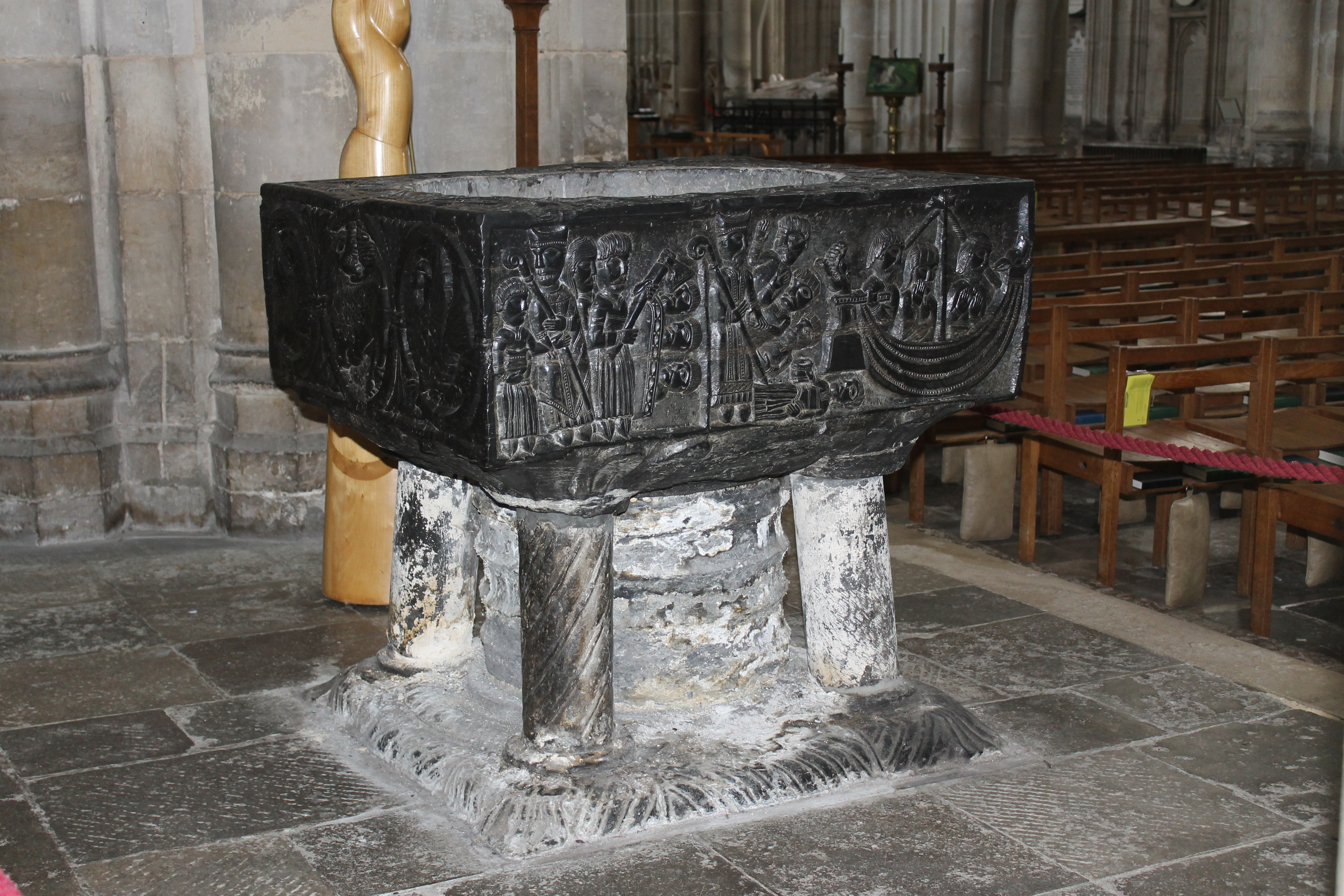
The Tournai marble font

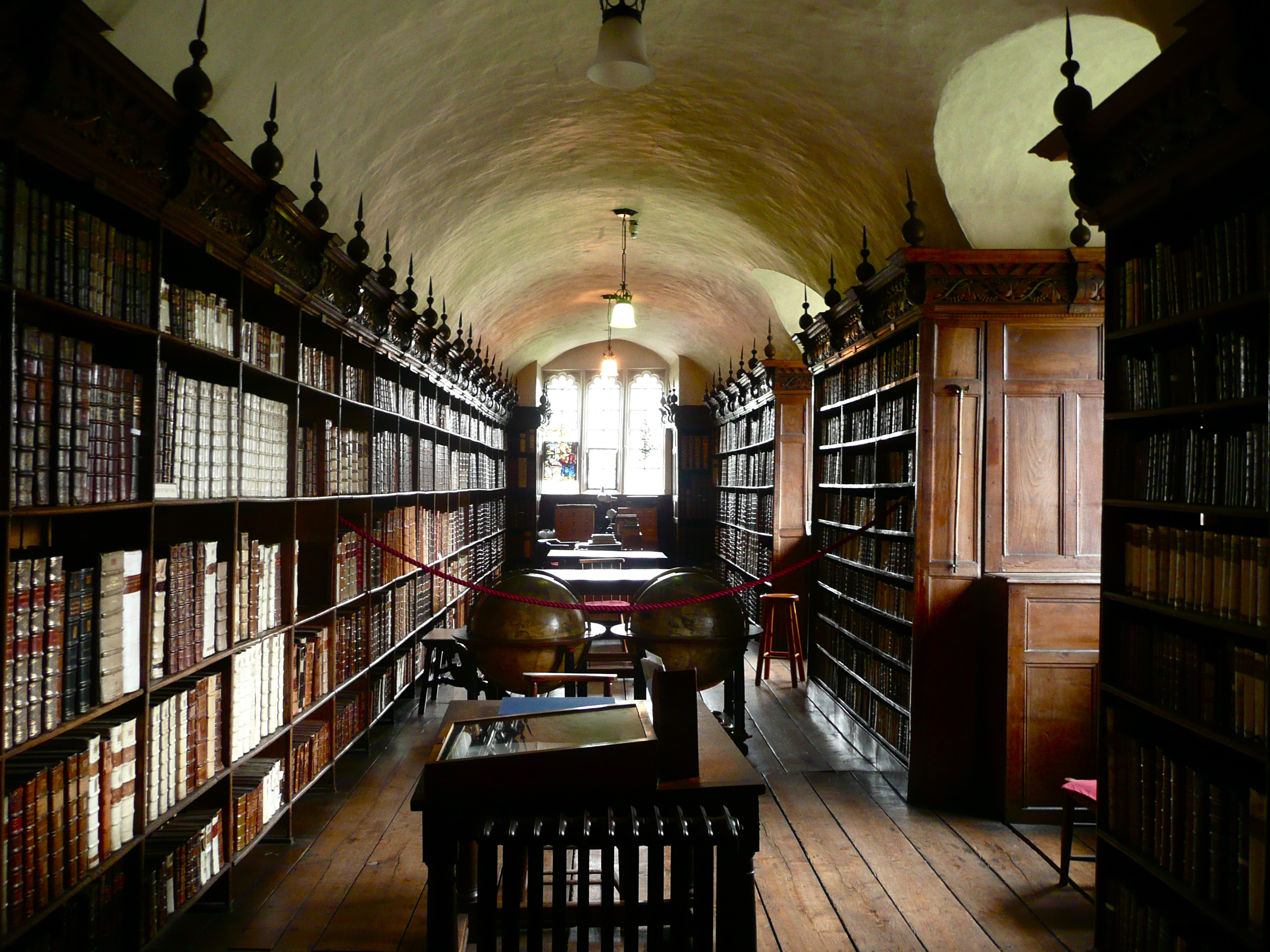
Morley Library

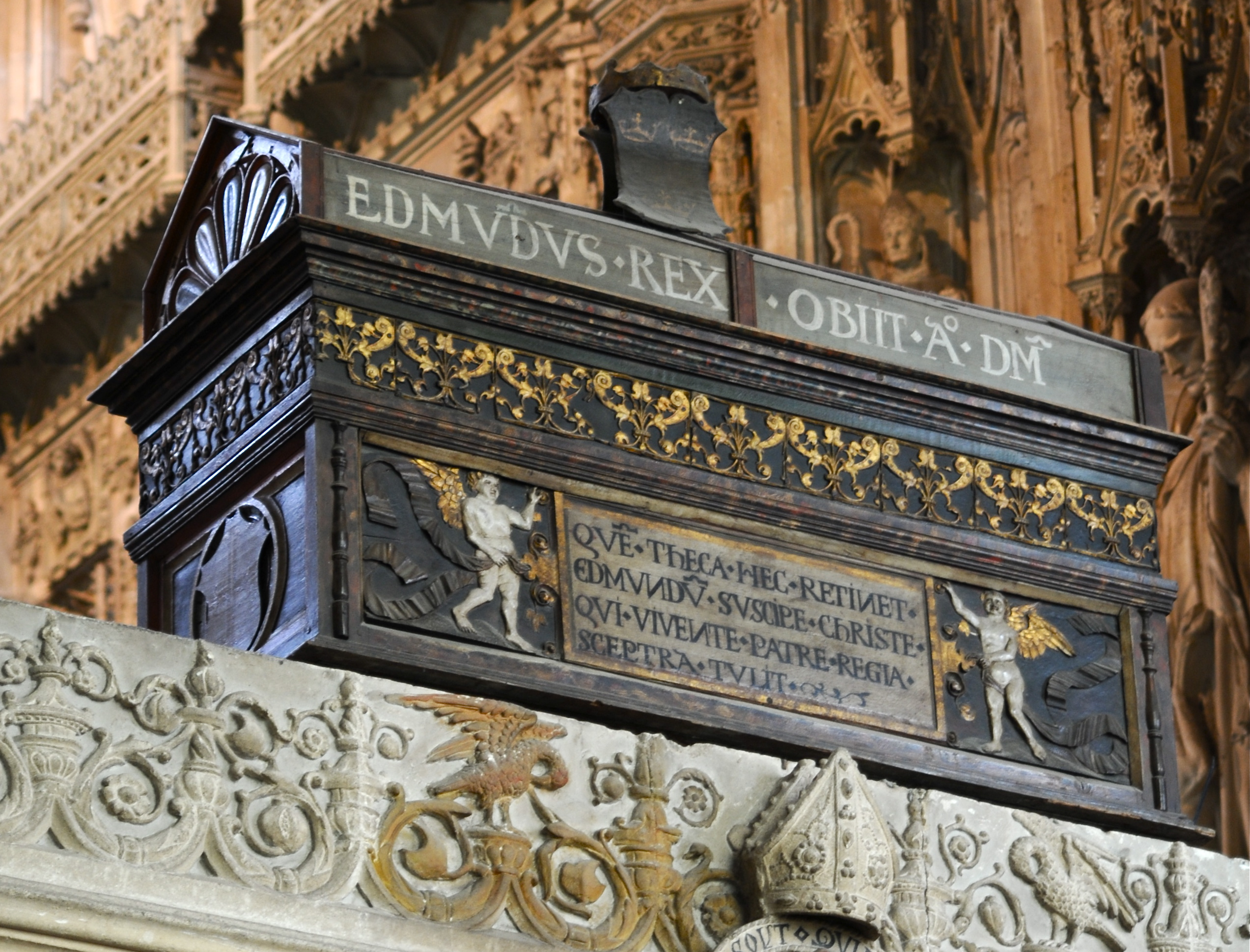
Mortuary chest of an unidentified King Edmund.

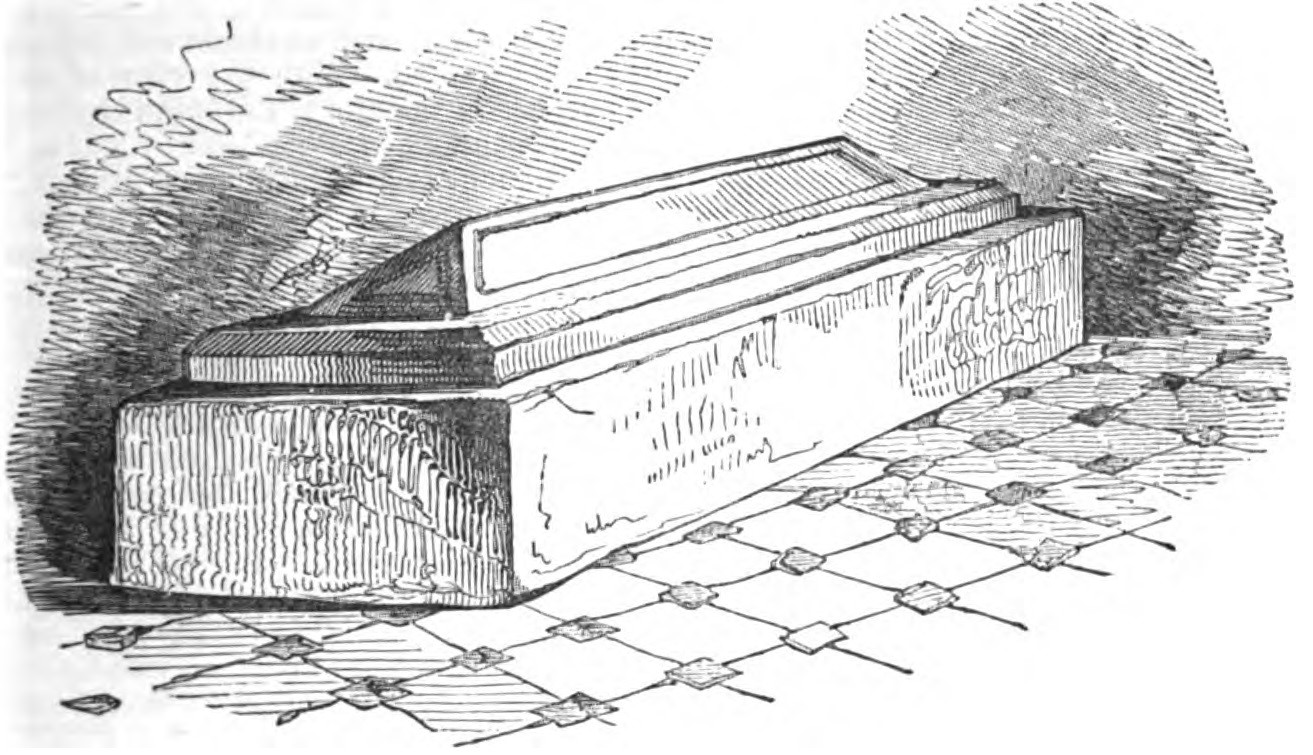
Tomb of William Rufus in Winchester Cathedral (Robert Chambers, p. 161, 1832)

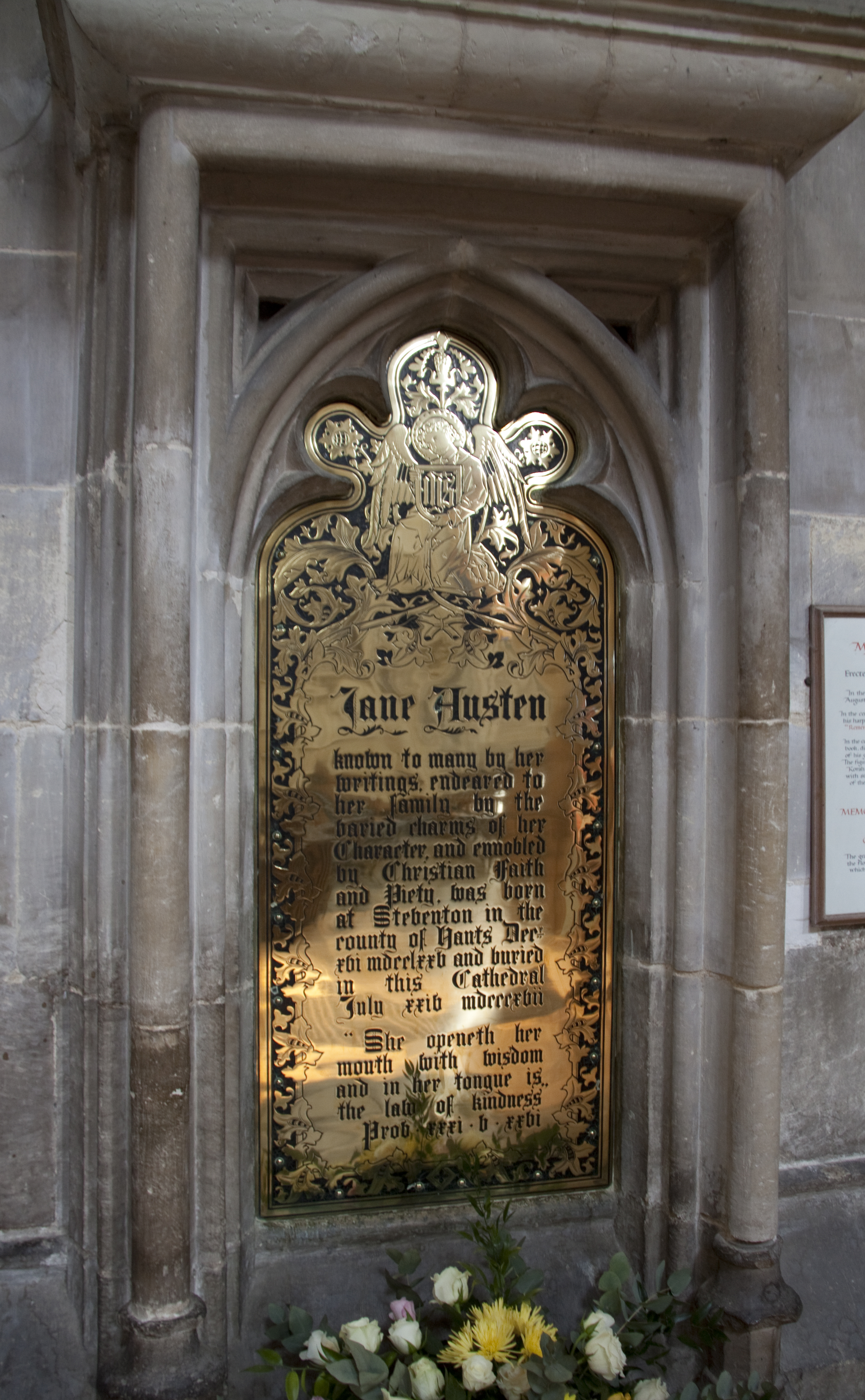
Monument to Jane Austen

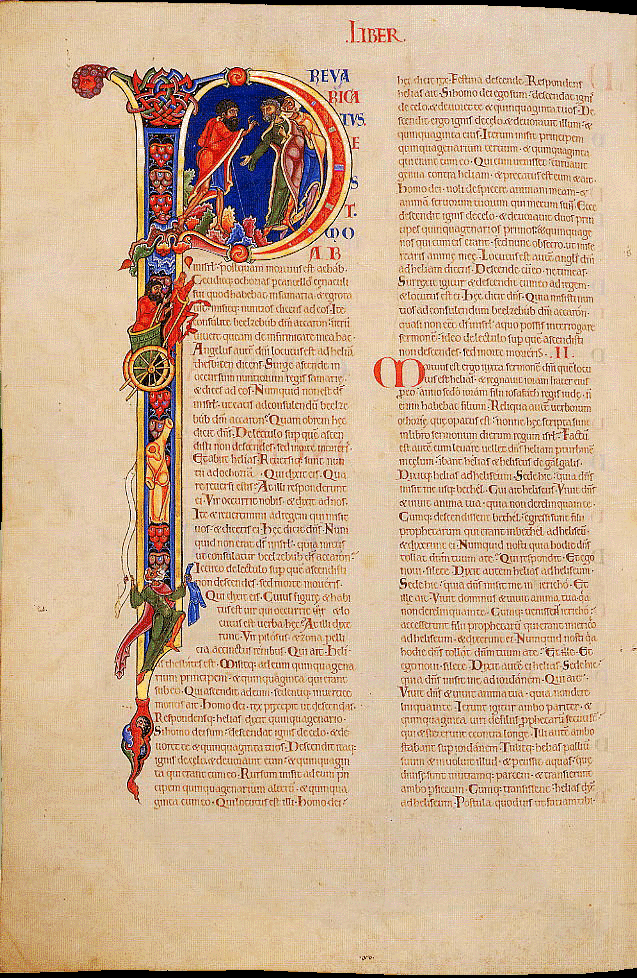
One of the pages of the Winchester Bible

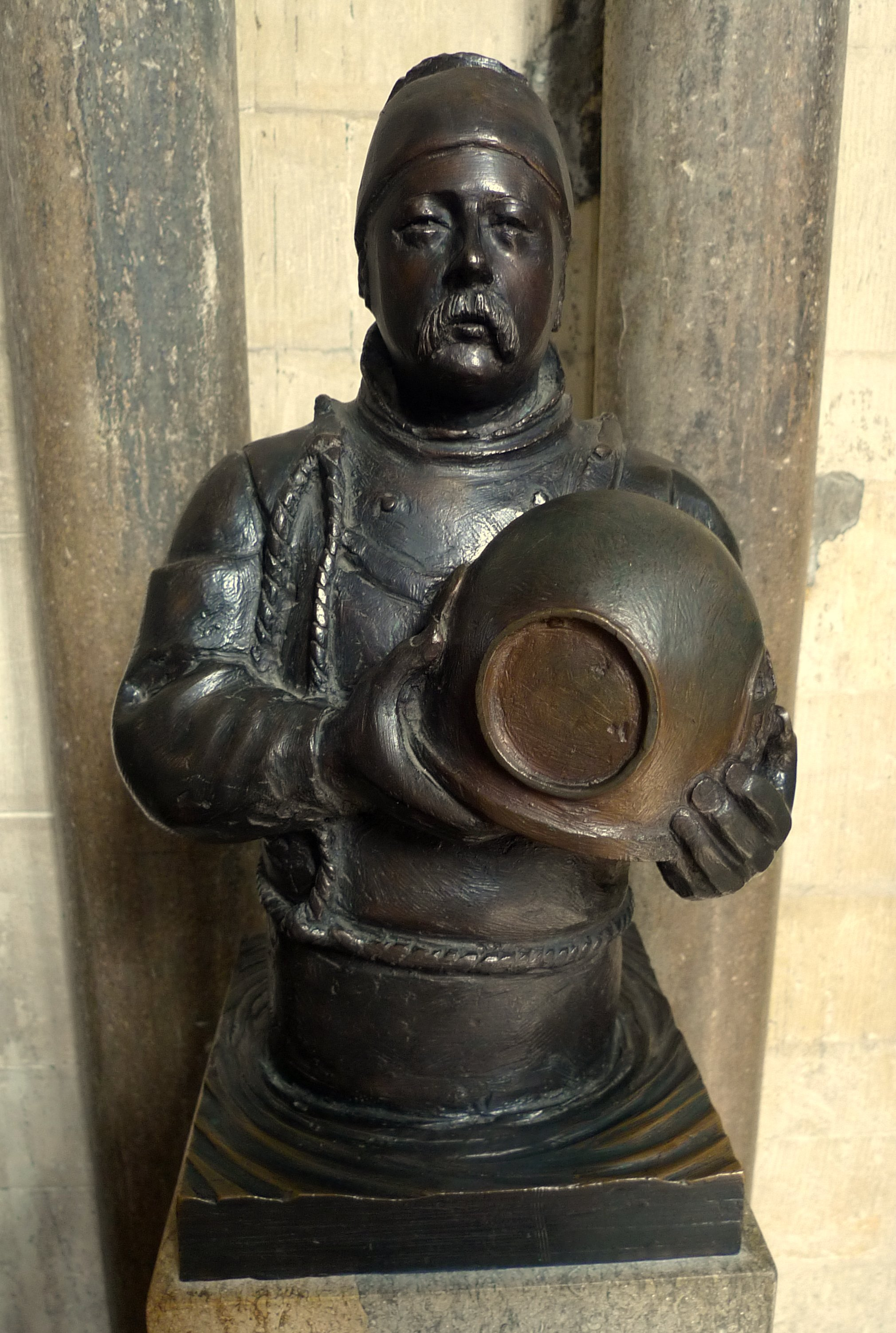
Bust of William Walker, who saved the cathedral by diving underneath it

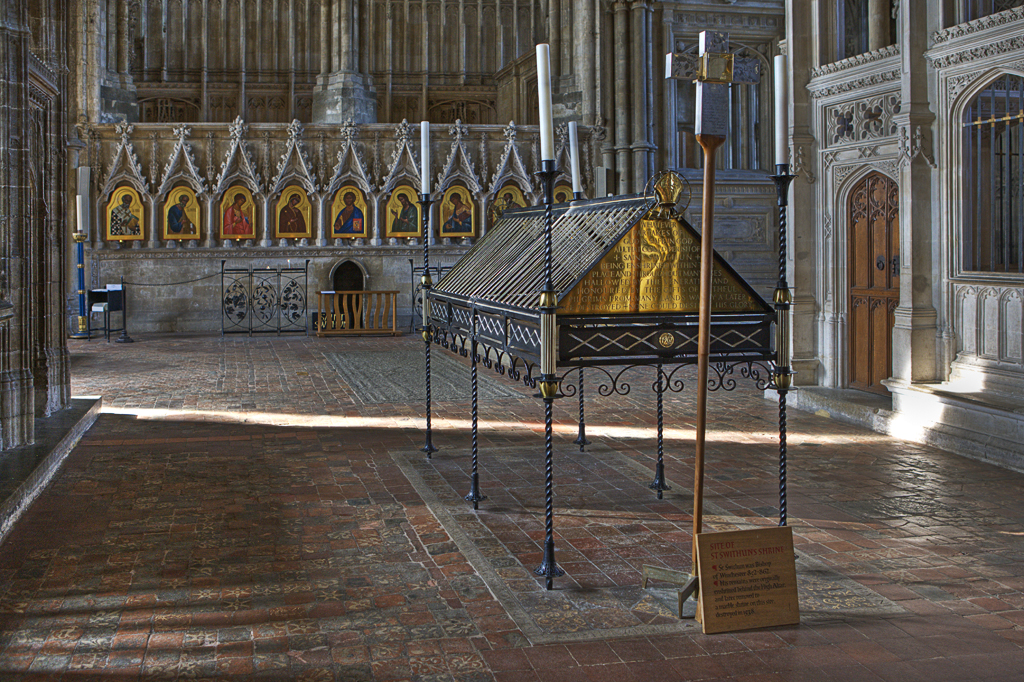
Site of the shrine of Swithun, destroyed in the Dissolution.

=== Chantry chapels ===
The cathedral building contains a large number of chantry chapels, often dedicated to the various Bishops of Winchester. These chantry chapels, which can be found mostly in the retroquire but also the nave, are intricately designed. Famous chantry chapels include those of William Wykeham, William Wayneflete, Richard Fox and Henry Beaufort.

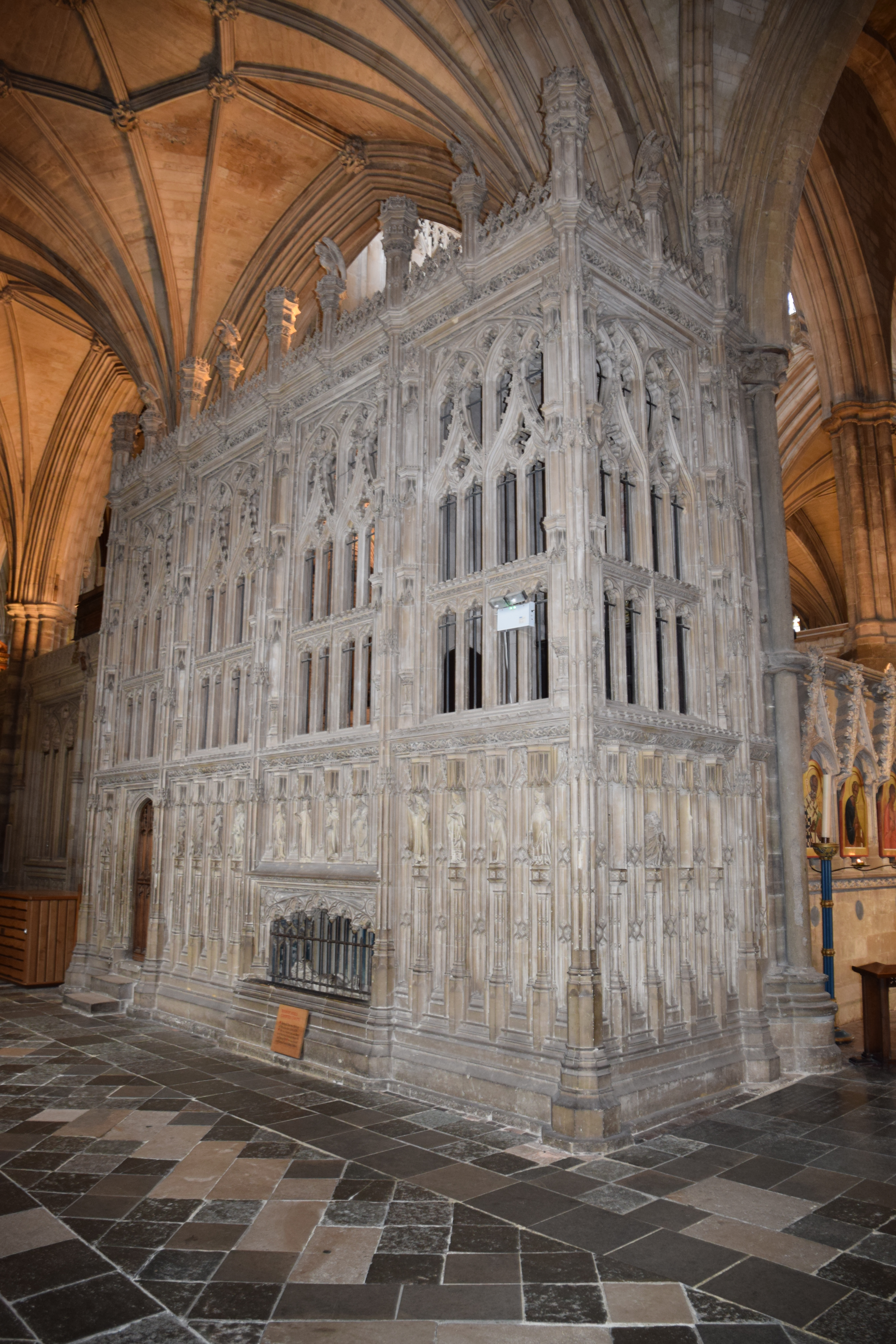
Bishop Fox's chantry chapel

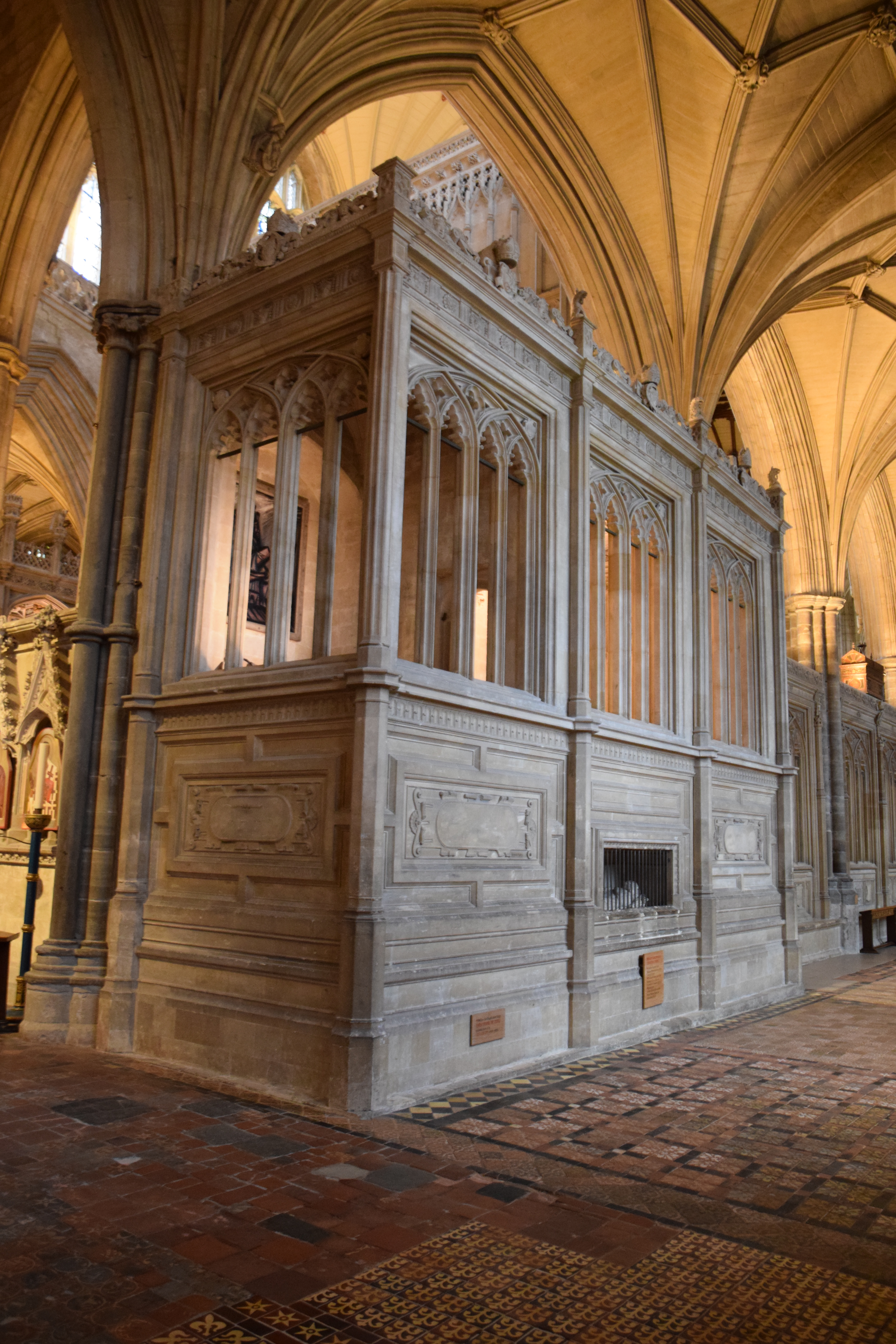
Bishop Gardiner's chantry chapel

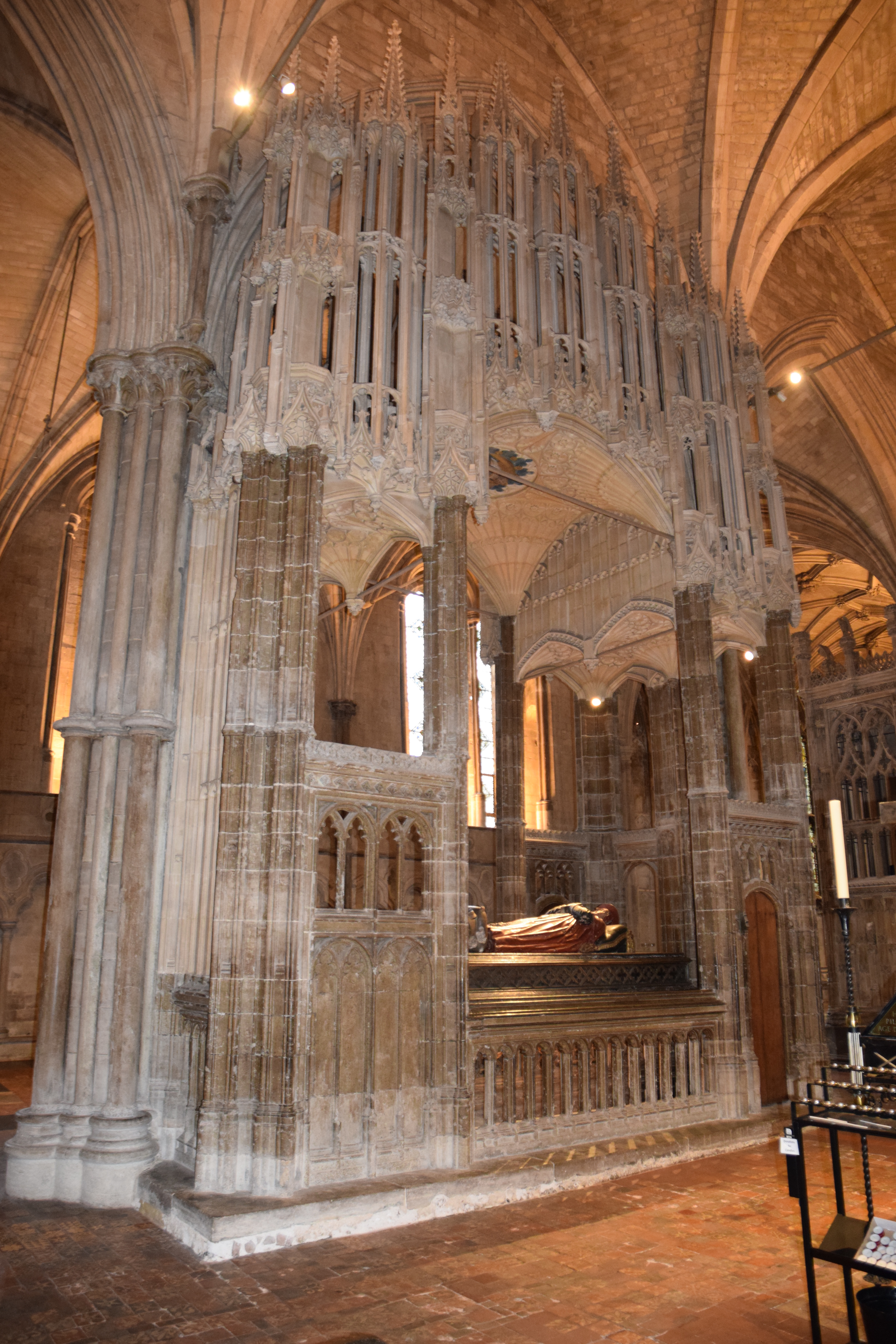
Henry Beaufort's chantry chapel

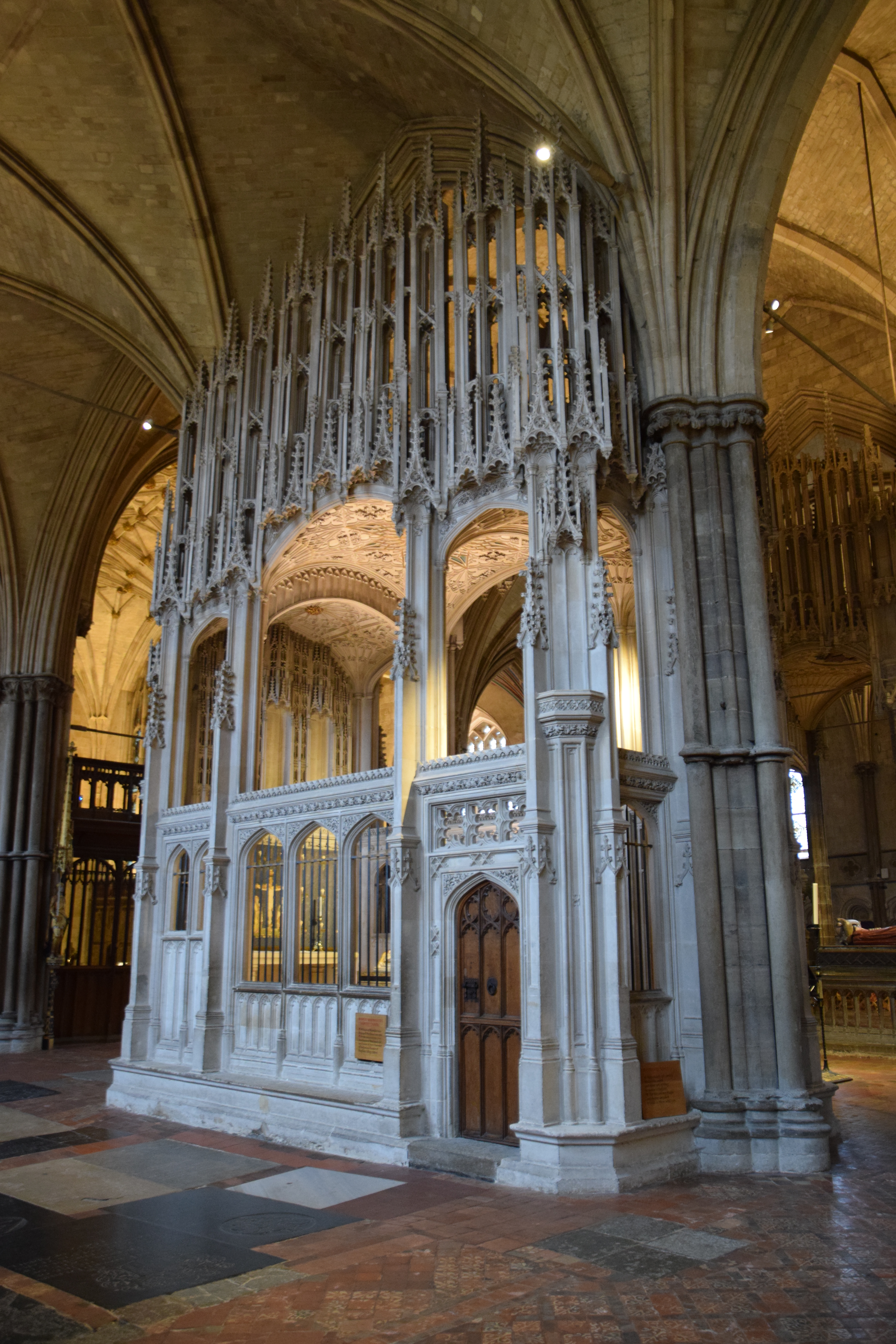
Chantry chapel of Bishop Wayneflete

== Music ==
=== Organ ===
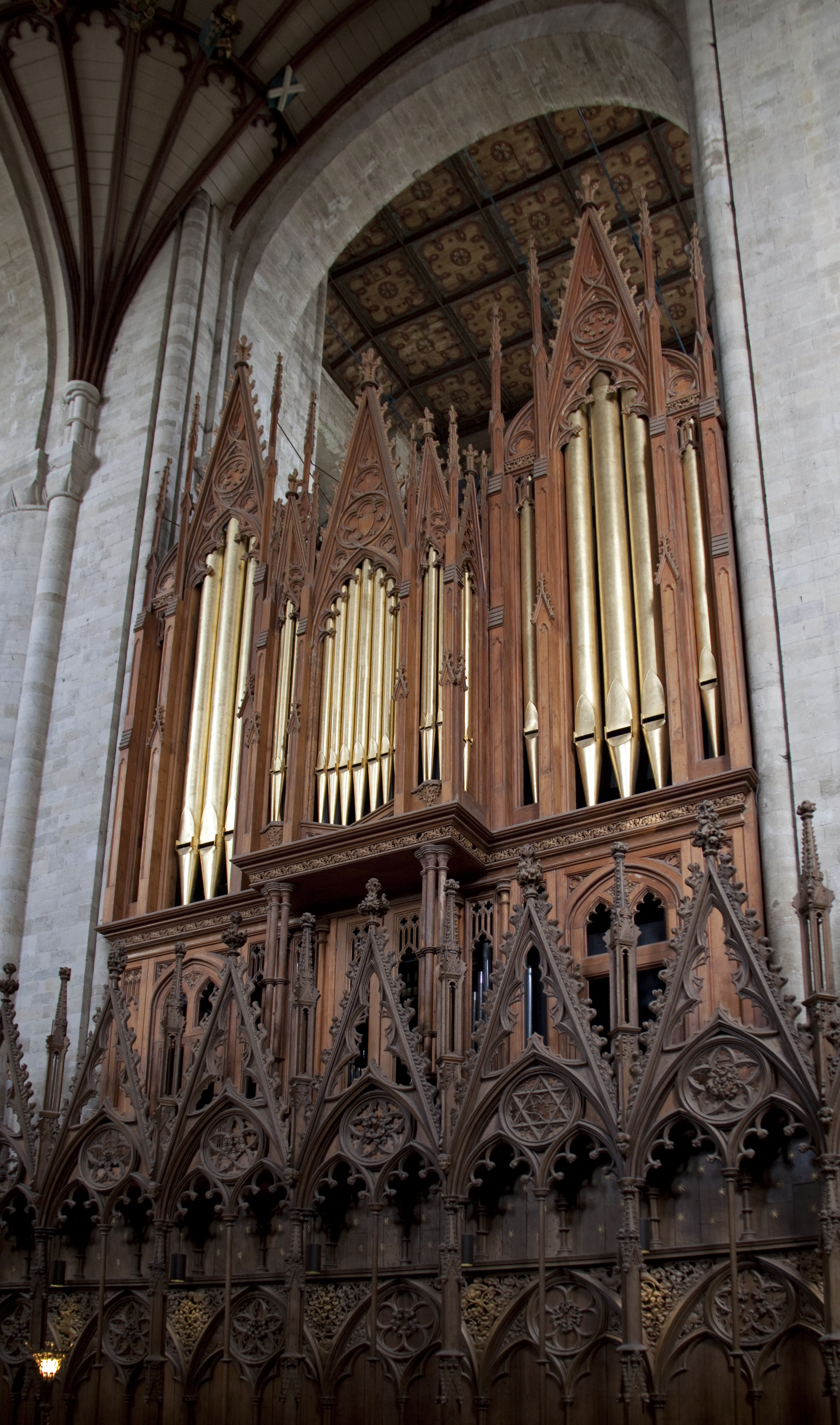
Organ case

The earliest recorded organ at Winchester Cathedral was in the tenth century; it had 400 pipes and could be heard throughout the city. This first organ required two men to play it, and 70 men to blow it. The present organ has its core dating back to 1851, when a very large instrument was built by Henry Willis and Sons for the Great Exhibition, held at The Crystal Palace, London. The then Cathedral organist, Samuel Wesley, visited the exhibition and was impressed by its size and tone. He recommended to the Dean & Chapter that they purchase the instrument for Winchester. The purchase was completed for £2,500, and the instrument was installed at Winchester three years later, in 1854, after being reduced in size slightly. The instrument, as installed, had four manuals and 49 stops.

It was modified in 1897 and 1905, and completely rebuilt by Harrison & Harrison in 1937 and again in 1986–1988. Organists at Winchester have included composer Richard Browne (1627–1629); Christopher Gibbons whose patronage aided the revival of church music after the Interregnum, Samuel Sebastian Wesley, the composer of sacred music and Martin Neary, who arranged the music for the funeral of Diana, Princess of Wales at Westminster Abbey.

The organ in its present form contains more than 5,500 pipes and 79 stops. The main organ case is underneath the tower arch adjoining the north transept.

=== Choir ===
The cathedral has several choirs. Its main choir is internationally recognised and currently consists of 22 boy choristers between the ages of 8 and 13, in addition to 12 adults, known as Lay Clerks. This choir sings six services per week during term time, and all the boys are educated at The Pilgrim School, located in the Cathedral Close.

The Cathedral Girls' Choir was founded in 1999 and is made up of 20 girls between the ages of 12 and 17, who are educated across Hampshire. The girls' choir sing a weekly Sunday service with the Lay Clerks during term time and unite with the boys for the major festivals of Christmas and Easter.

The Cathedral Chamber Choir is formed of 30 professional adult singers from across Hampshire, and provide choral music for school holidays when the boy and girl choirs are on break, except for Easter and Christmas. The choir regularly performs at concerts.

Additionally, there is a volunteer choir formed of members of the congregation, known as the Cathedral Nave Choir, formed of 40 adults. The Nave Choir sing one service per month. There are also two further youth choirs, one called the Junior Choir, and the other called the Youth Choir. The Junior Choir is a mixed choir of boys and girls between the ages of 7 and 13. There is no audition process for the Junior Choir, unlike all the other choirs. The Youth Choir is similar to the Junior Choir, but is for boys and girls over the age of 14, and requires an audition process.

=== Bells ===
Bells have rung out from the Cathedral since Saxon times. It is recorded that King Cnut gave two bells to the Old Minster where he was buried in 1035, though neither of these bells survive. By the middle of the 17th century, following conversion of the tower from a lantern into a tower suitable for bells, seven bells were installed in a very large oak frame made by John Williams.

This frame was strengthened and extended several times, and by 1883, there were eight bells installed, the largest bell weighing some 32 long cwt (1,626 kg). Four of these bells were cast by Richard Phelps in 1734, which were the third, fifth, seventh and tenor bells. The second bell was cast by Theodore Ecclestone in 1742, with treble cast by Robert Wells in 1772 and the fourth and sixth cast by James Wells in 1814.

In 1891, the tenor bell cracked and was recast by Mears & Stainbank of the Whitechapel Bell Foundry in 1892 to a slightly lighter weight of 30 long cwt (1,524 kg). At the same time, the bells were augmented to ten with two new trebles, also by Mears & Stainbank, hung in a new extension frame. The existing bells were also rehung at the same time.

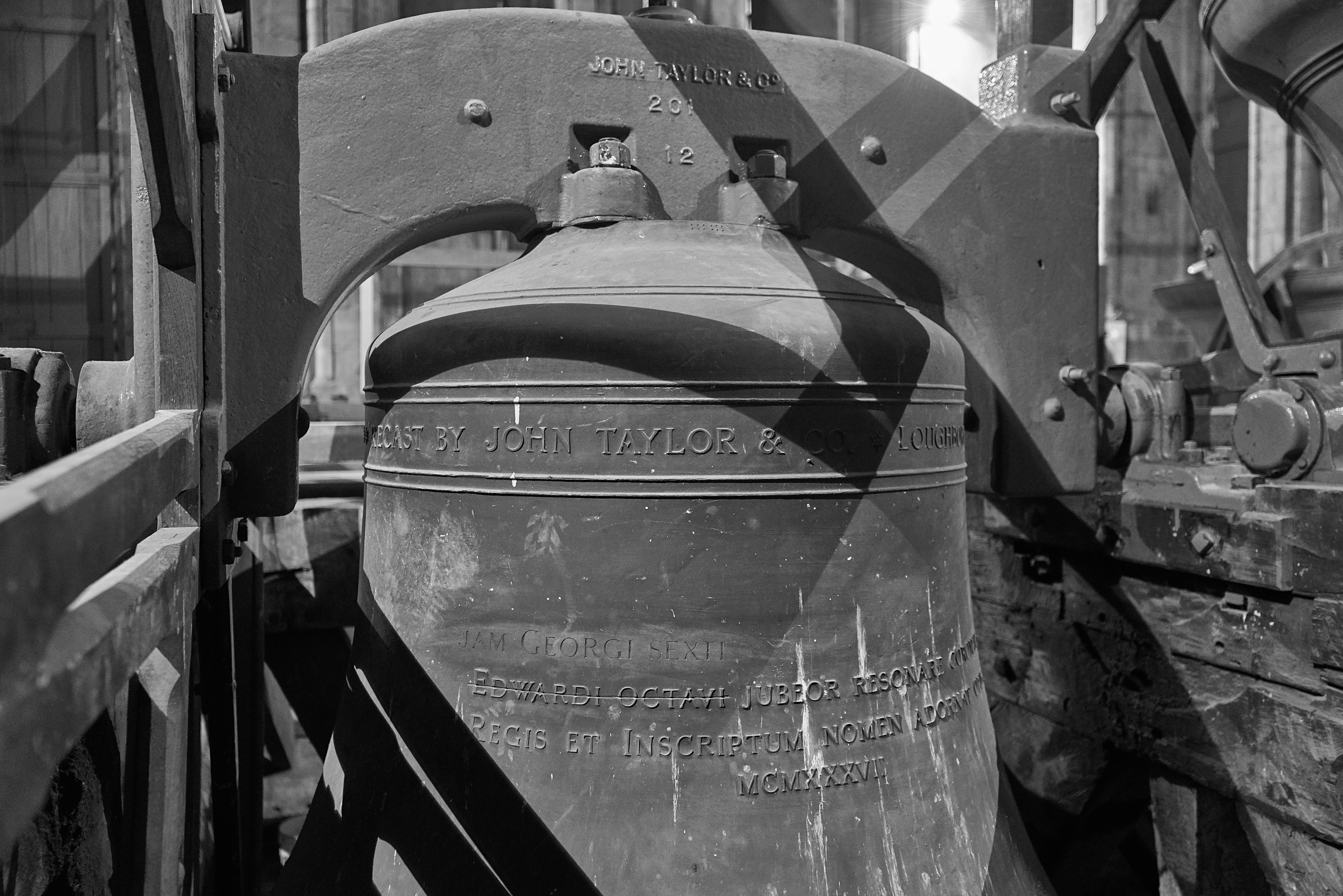
The inscription on the tenor bell at the Cathedral shows 'Edward Octavi' crossed out due to the King's abdication.

In 1921, the bells were augmented to twelve with the addition of two new treble bells, cast by Gillett & Johnston of Croydon, to give Hampshire and the Diocese of Winchester its first ring of twelve bells. The new bells were dedicated to the fallen of Winchester in the First World War. This peal of twelve was not to last long, however, as the bells were taken down in 1936 and sent to John Taylor & Co of Loughborough, Leicestershire, for complete recasting.

The bells were intended to be recast for the coronation of Edward VIII, and the inscription on the tenor bell makes note of this. However, by the time the metal had cooled, the bells tuned and rehung in Winchester, Edward had abdicated, and his brother George VI became king. As a result, the inscription 'Edwardi Octavi' was crossed out, and 'Georgi Sexti' was etched in by hand. The new Taylor bells were a heavier peal of twelve, with the tenor bell weighing some 35 and a half long hundredweight (1,806 kg). The heaviest eight bells were rehung back in the original 1734 oak frame, with the four treble bells hung in a new metal extension. All twelve bells received new fittings, including cast iron headstocks and ball bearings. The new bells were an immediate success, considered far superior to the ring they replaced, being described in The Ringing World as "a truly magnificent peal".

In 1967, a redundant bell from St Lawrence's Church in Winchester was transferred to the cathedral and hung in a new cast iron metal frame as a semitone bell, called a flat sixth. This extra bell enabled a lighter peal of eight to be rung when the natural sixth was substituted for the 'new' flat sixth, thus avoiding using the heaviest bells. This bell weighs 6 and a half long cwt (340 kg) and was cast by Anthony Bond in 1621, thus making it the oldest bell in the cathedral tower. This bell celebrated its 400th anniversary in 2021.

By 1991, restoration was required again, though this time it was the tower that required attention. It was found in a survey that the great wooden frame, which was not attached to any of the tower walls as modern frames are, was moving and shifting on the belfry floor during the ringing, and that was damaging both the tower and the floor. Additionally, the floor beams were rotting, and the louvre boards were damaged. Ringing was suspended indefinitely. The resulting restoration involved lowering all 13 bells (the ring of twelve plus the ex-St Laurence bell) to the ringing chamber where they were hung on a special scaffold. With the frame clear of bells, it was hoisted up clear of the belfry floor, suspended from massive steel girders dug into the tower walls. The floor was repaired with new beams replacing some very severely rotted ones, and the newly strengthened bell frame lowered back onto it and the bells rehung. At the same time, it was decided to augment the bells to the world's first diatonic ring of fourteen, with two new treble bells cast by Whitechapel Bell Foundry in 1992, and a third extra bell to become a sharp fourth, to be used in much the same way as the ex-St Laurence bell – to provide a lighter peal of ten without using the three tenor bells. A new frame was provided for the lightest seven bells, constructed of iroko, replacing the metal frame provided in the 1937 recast.

No major work has been carried out on the bells since 1992. They remain the only diatonic peal of fourteen change ringing bells in the world. The eight largest bells continue to be hung in John William's 1734 oak frame, which is one of the largest surviving frames of its kind.

In 2021, new timber shafted clappers were supplied for the two largest bells by the original founders, John Taylor & Co, which has increased the resonance of the two heaviest bells in the cathedral.

== Cultural connections ==
Nowadays the cathedral draws many tourists as a result of its association with Jane Austen, who died in Winchester on 18 July 1817. Her funeral was held in the cathedral, and she was buried in the north aisle. The inscription on her tombstone makes no mention of her novels, but a later brass tablet, paid for from the proceeds of her first biography, describes her as "known to many by her writings". There is also a memorial window in her honour by C E Kempe.

Having spent three years in the city as a child, the novelist Anthony Trollope borrowed features of the cathedral and the city for his Chronicles of Barsetshire. In 2005, the building was used as a film set for The Da Vinci Code, with the north transept used as the Vatican. Following this, the cathedral hosted discussions and displays to debunk the book.

Winchester Cathedral is possibly the only cathedral to have had popular songs written about it. "Winchester Cathedral" was a UK top ten hit and a US number one song for The New Vaudeville Band in 1966. The cathedral was also the subject of the Crosby, Stills & Nash song "Cathedral" from their 1977 album CSN. Liverpool-based band Clinic released an album titled Winchester Cathedral in 2004.

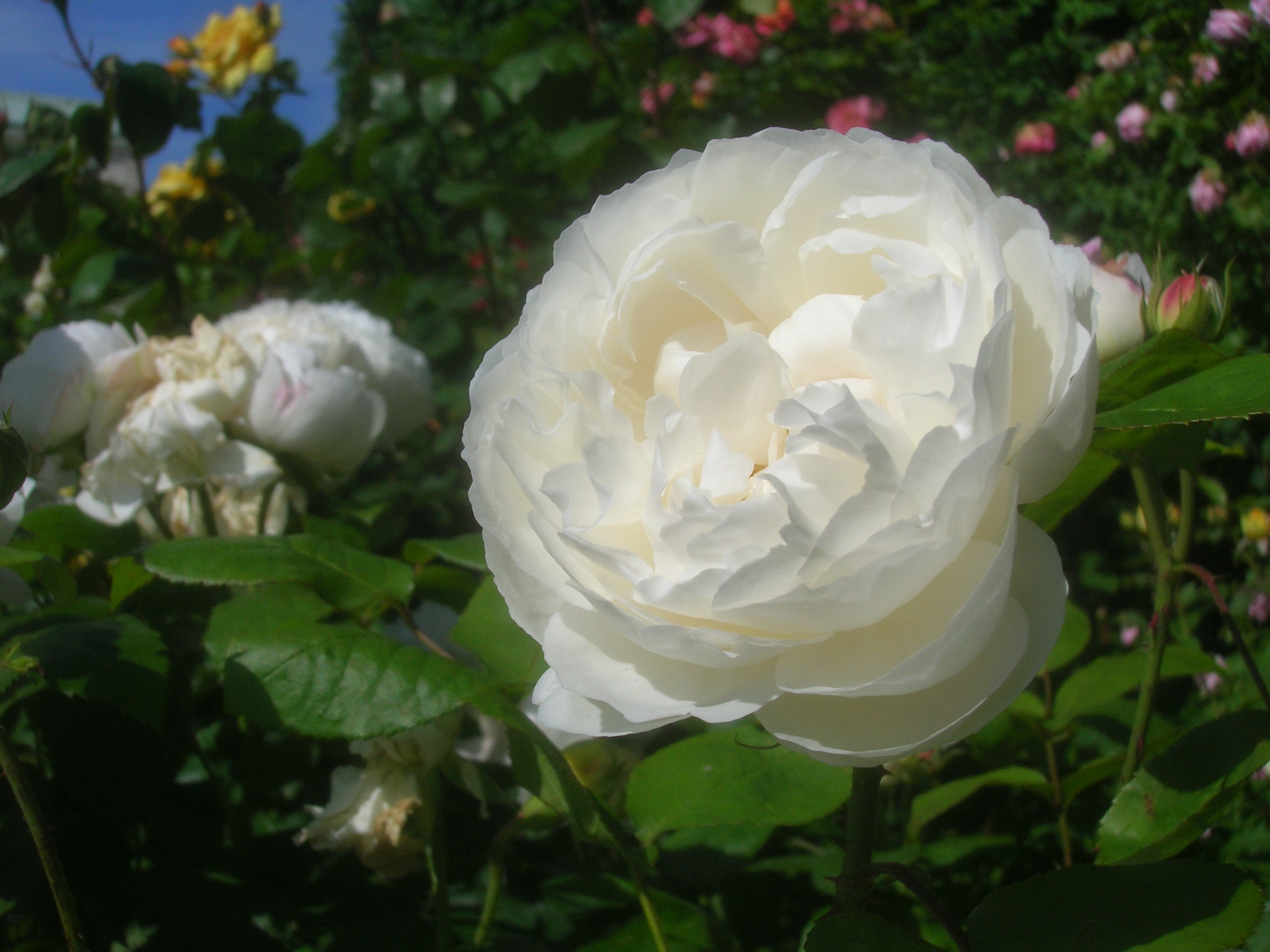
Rose cultivar 'Winchester Cathedral', Austin 1992

In 1992, the British rosarian David Austin introduced a white sport of his rose cultivar "Mary Rose" (1983) as "Winchester Cathedral".

When he was posted to England during the First World War, Bill Wilson, the co-founder of Alcoholics Anonymous, visited the cathedral and had an initial experience of the presence of God.

The cathedral is the starting point of the 34-mile-long St Swithun's Way, a long-distance footpath which was opened in 2002 to commemorate the Golden Jubilee of Elizabeth II.

The cathedral and surrounding area have been used multiple times as a filming location for The Crown, a popular Netflix historical drama series based on the monarchy during the time of Queen Elizabeth II's reign. The interior has been used as a substitute for both Westminster Abbey (for the funeral of Lord Louis Mountbatten in Season 4) and St Paul's Cathedral (for Sir Winston Churchill's funeral in Season 3, and for Prince Charles and Lady Diana Spencer's wedding rehearsals and subsequent wedding in Season 4).

Each November and December since 2006, the Cathedral grounds have hosted the Winchester Cathedral Christmas Market.

== Public access ==
In common with many other Anglican cathedrals in the United Kingdom, an admission fee has been charged for visitors to enter the cathedral since March 2006. Visitors may request an annual pass for the same price as a single admission.

== Dean and chapter ==
As of 14 June 2026:

- Dean – Christopher Palmer (formerly Canon Chancellor of Exeter Cathedral) following the resignation of Catherine Ogle, March 2025
- Vice Dean (formerly Canon Chancellor and Pastor) – Roland Riem (Vice-Dean since 2012; Canon Pastor since end of June 2005; Chancellor since before 2011)
- Canon Missioner – Dr Tess Kuin Lawton (since 2021)
- Canon Precentor and Sacrist – vacant following conclusion of tenure of Andrew Trenier (2019 – 11 July 2025)
- Chaplain – Julian Poppleton (since May 2025)
- Canon Treasurer – Andrew Micklefield (since April 2025)
- Non-executive member of Chapter – Professor Elizabeth Stuart
- Non-executive member of Chapter – Alan Lovell
- Non-executive member of Chapter – Sarah Peppiatt

== Disposal of the dead ==
=== Burials ===
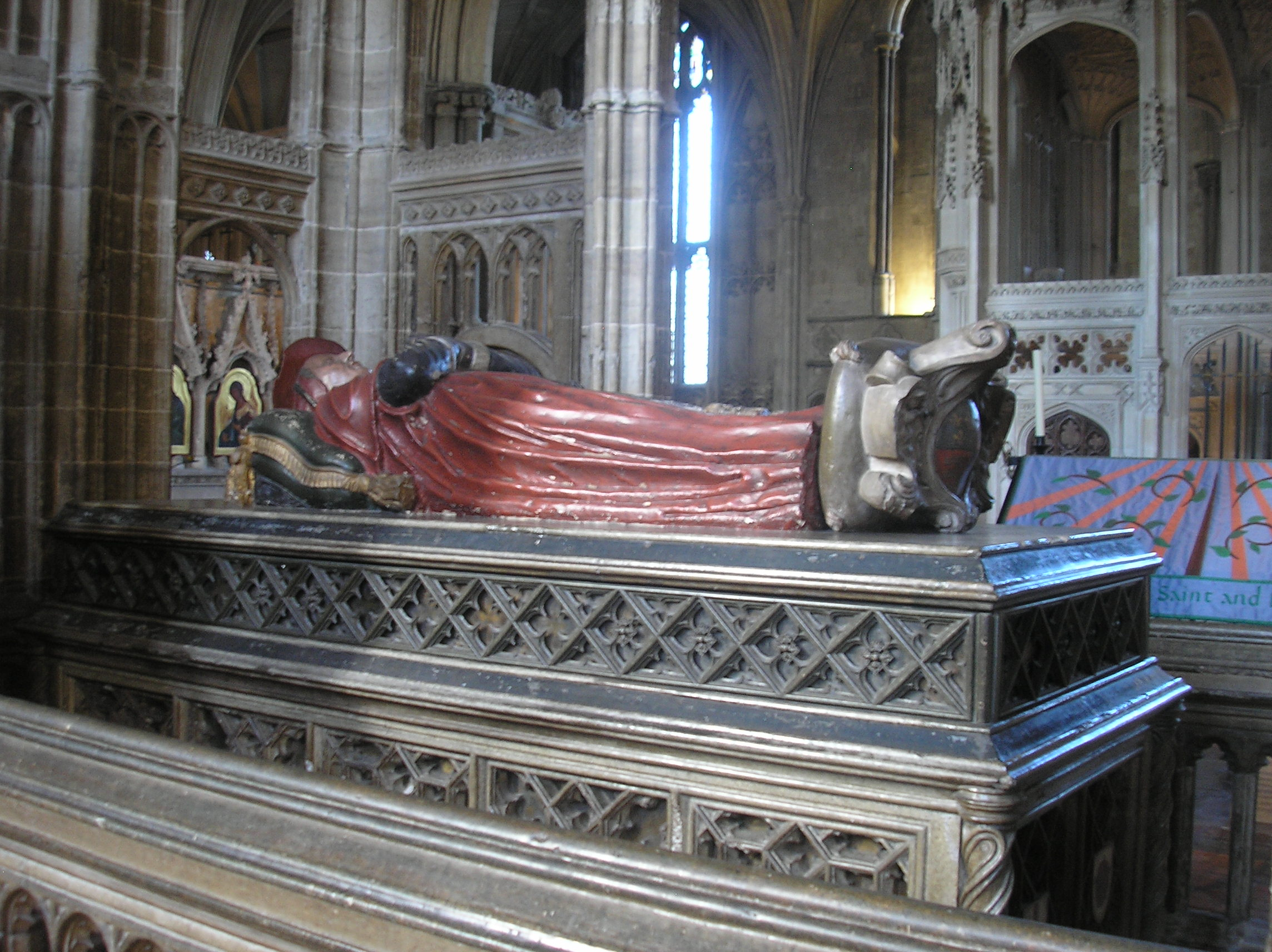
Tomb of Cardinal Beaufort

- Saint Birinus – his relics were eventually translated here
- Walkelin, first Norman Bishop of Winchester (1070–1098)
- Henry of Blois (or Henry of Winchester), Abbot of Glastonbury Abbey (1126–1129) and Bishop of Winchester (1129–1171)
- Richard of Ilchester, Bishop of Winchester (1173–1188) and medieval English statesman
- Godfrey de Luci, Bishop of Winchester (1189–1204)
- Peter des Roches, Bishop of Winchester (1205–1238) and Chief Justiciar of England (1213 – c.1215)
- Henry Beaufort (1375–1447), Cardinal and Bishop of Winchester (legitimised son of John of Gaunt and Lord Chancellor of England under Henry V and Henry VI)
- Izaak Walton, author of The Compleat Angler (9 August 1593 – 15 December 1683)
- John Ecton, Queen Anne's Bounty official, legal compiler and author, died at Turnham Green, Middlesex, on 20 August 1730 – his will, bearing date 7 July 1730, was proved at London, 8 September 1730, by his widow, Dorothea Ecton, noting that he desired to be buried in Winchester Cathedral
- Jane Austen (1817)

=== Displaced in mortuary chests ===
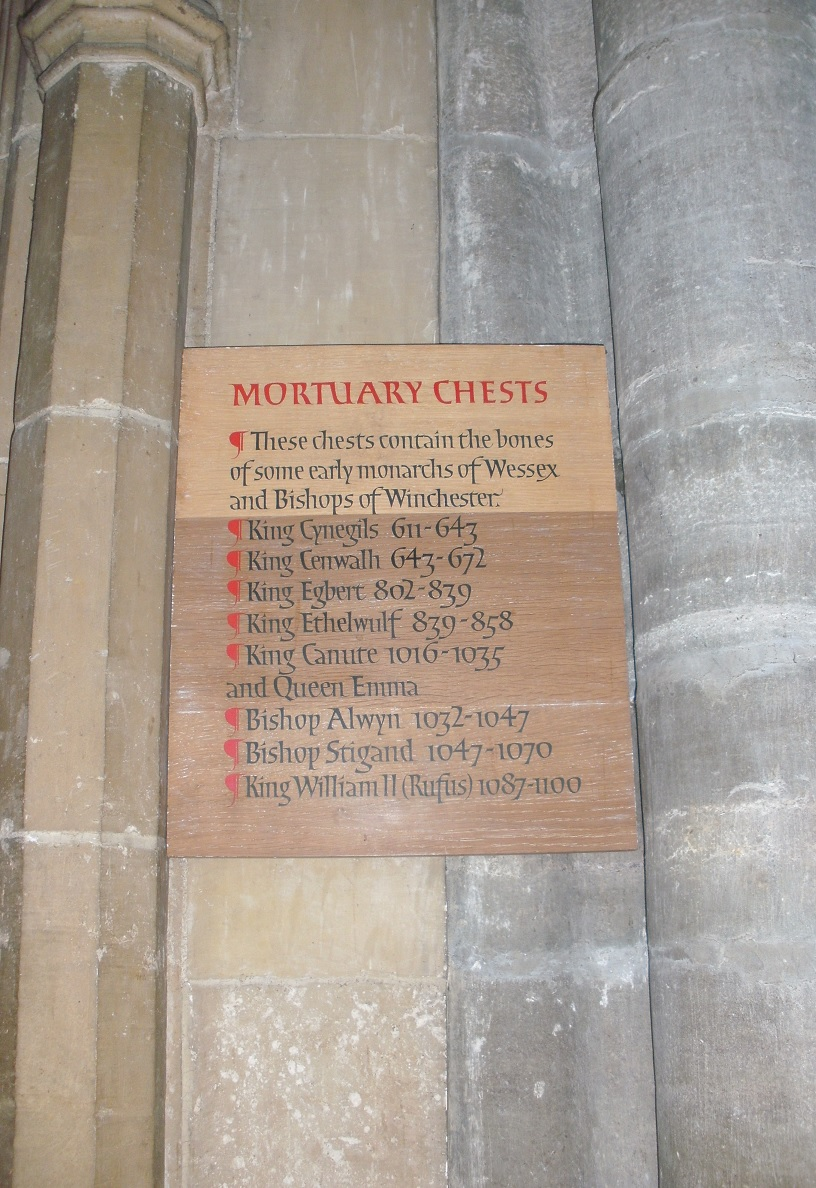
Panel with list of mortuary chests and their contents in Winchester Cathedral

- Cynegils, King of Wessex (611–643)
- Cenwalh, King of Wessex (643–672)
- Egbert of Wessex, King of Wessex (802–839)
- Ethelwulf, King of Wessex (839–856)
- Eadred, King of England (946–955)
- Eadwig, King of England and later Wessex (955–959)
- Cnut or Canute, King of England (1016–1035) and also of Denmark and Norway
- Emma of Normandy, wife of Cnut and also of Æthelred the Unready of England
- William II 'Rufus', King of England (1087–1100) – not in the traditional tomb associated with him, which may in fact be that of his nephew Henry of Blois, brother of King Stephen of England

Also

- Harthacnut, King of England (1040–1042) and also of Denmark
- Stigand, Archbishop of Canterbury (d. 1072)

One of the mortuary chests also refers to a king 'Edmund', perhaps either Edmund I, grandson of Alfred, or Edmund Ironside, (d. 1016). However, both are reported as buried at Glastonbury Abbey in most accounts, including the Anglo-Saxon Chronicle.

=== Originally buried at Winchester ===
- Edward the Elder, King of England (899–924) – later moved to Hyde Abbey
- Alfred the Great, King of Wessex (875–899) – moved from Old Minster and later to Hyde Abbey

== See also ==
- Wedding of Mary I of England and Philip of Spain
- Architecture of the medieval cathedrals of England
- English Gothic architecture
- Priory of Saint Swithun
- Romanesque architecture
- Gothic cathedrals and churches
- List of Gothic Cathedrals in Europe

== Bibliography ==
- Bumpus, T Francis (1930). The Cathedrals of England and Wales. London: T. Werner Laurie. OCLC 5626538.
- Sergeant, Philip Walsingham (1899). The Cathedral Church of Winchester. Bell's Cathedrals. London: George Bell and Sons. OCLC 537801.
