= John Waddington (priest) =

John Albert Henry Waddington, MBE, TD (10 February 1910 – 23 November 1994) was the Provost of St Edmundsbury from 1958 to 1976.

He was educated at Wandsworth Grammar School and the London College of Divinity and ordained in 1934. His first ecclesiastical posts were curacies at St Andrew's, Streatham and St Paul's, Furzedown. After this he was Rector of Great Bircham from 1938 to 1945 then Vicar of St Peter Mancroft, Norwich until 1958.

In 1968 Waddington was appointed Grand Chaplain of the Royal Masonic Order.

Church of England titles
| Preceded by John Lawrence White | Provost of St Edmundsbury; 1958 –1976 | Succeeded by David Rokeby Maddock |
