= Frances Ward (priest) =

The Reverend Frances Ward
- Dean of St Edmundsbury
- Church: Church of England
- Diocese: St Edmundsbury and Ipswich
- In office: 2010–2017
- Predecessor: Neil Collings
- Successor: Joe Hawes

Orders
- Ordination: 1989 (deacon); 1994 (priest)

Personal details
- Born: 16 September 1959 (age 66) Geelong, Victoria, Australia
- Denomination: Anglicanism
- Education: King's Ely
- Alma mater: University of St Andrews; University of Manchester; Westcott House, Cambridge

Frances Elizabeth Fearn Ward (born 16 September 1959) is an Anglican priest and theologian. She served as Dean of St Edmundsbury from 2010 to 2017.

== Early life and education ==
Ward was born on 16 September 1959 in Geelong, Victoria, Australia. She was educated at King's Ely. She later studied at the University of St Andrews and the University of Manchester. From 1987 to 1989, she trained for holy orders at Westcott House, Cambridge, an Anglican theological college in the Liberal Catholic tradition.

== Ordained ministry ==
She was ordained deacon in 1989 and priest in 1994. She was then a tutor at Northern College until 1998 and then Vicar of St Peter's Bury until 2005. She was a residentiary canon at Bradford Cathedral from 2006 until her appointment as Dean in 2010.

On 30 May 2010, it was announced that Ward would be the next Dean of St Edmundsbury in succession to Neil Collings. In October 2010, she was installed as dean at St Edmundsbury Cathedral. In July 2017, it was announced that she would be stepping down as Dean later in the year and would be returning to academia to complete a second doctorate; her final service at the cathedral was on 15 October 2017.

Since 2018, Ward has held a Licence to Officiate in the Diocese of Carlisle. On 2 February 2020 she was licensed as Priest-in-Charge of St John's Church, Workington and St Michael's Church, Workington.

=== Views ===
Ward belongs to the Catholic Anglican tradition of the Church of England. She is a supporter of the ordination of women as priests and bishops.

== Selected works ==
Among other books she has written:

- Lifelong Learning (2005)
- Studying Local Churches (2005)
- Theological Reflection Methods (2005)
- Theological Reflection Sources (2007)
- Why Rousseau Was Wrong: Christianity and the Secular Soul (2013)
- Holy Attention: Preaching in Today’s Church (2019)
- Full of Character: A Christian Approach to Education for the Digital Age (2019)
- Like There’s No Tomorrow: Climate Crisis, Eco-Anxiety and God (2020)
