= Wandsworth School =

Former school in south west London

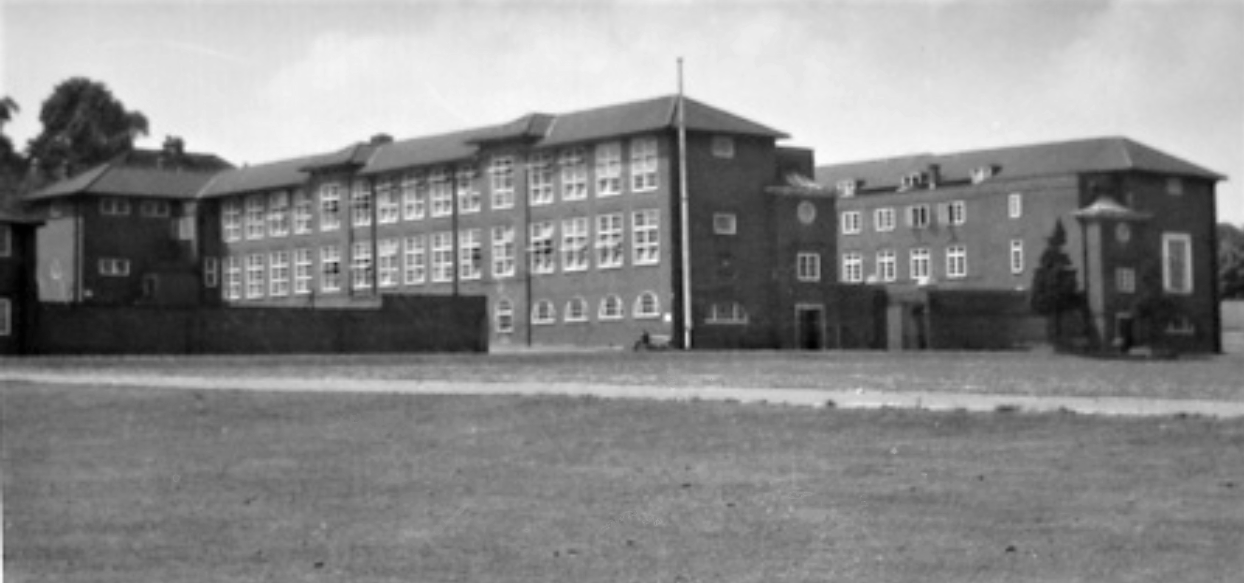
- Wandsworth School, 1927 building.

Location
- Sutherland Grove, Southfields, Wandsworth; London, SW18 5JF; England; 51°26′51″N 0°12′30″W

Information
- Type: Technical school (1895–1902); Grammar school (1902–57); Comprehensive school (1957–91)
- Established: 1895; 131 years ago (Sutherland Grove site: 1927; 99 years ago)
- Closed: 1988; 38 years ago: Merged with Spencer Park to become John Archer
- School district: Wandsworth,
- Local authority: London County Council (to 1964); Inner London Education Authority (from 1965)
- Gender: Boys
- Age: 11 to 18

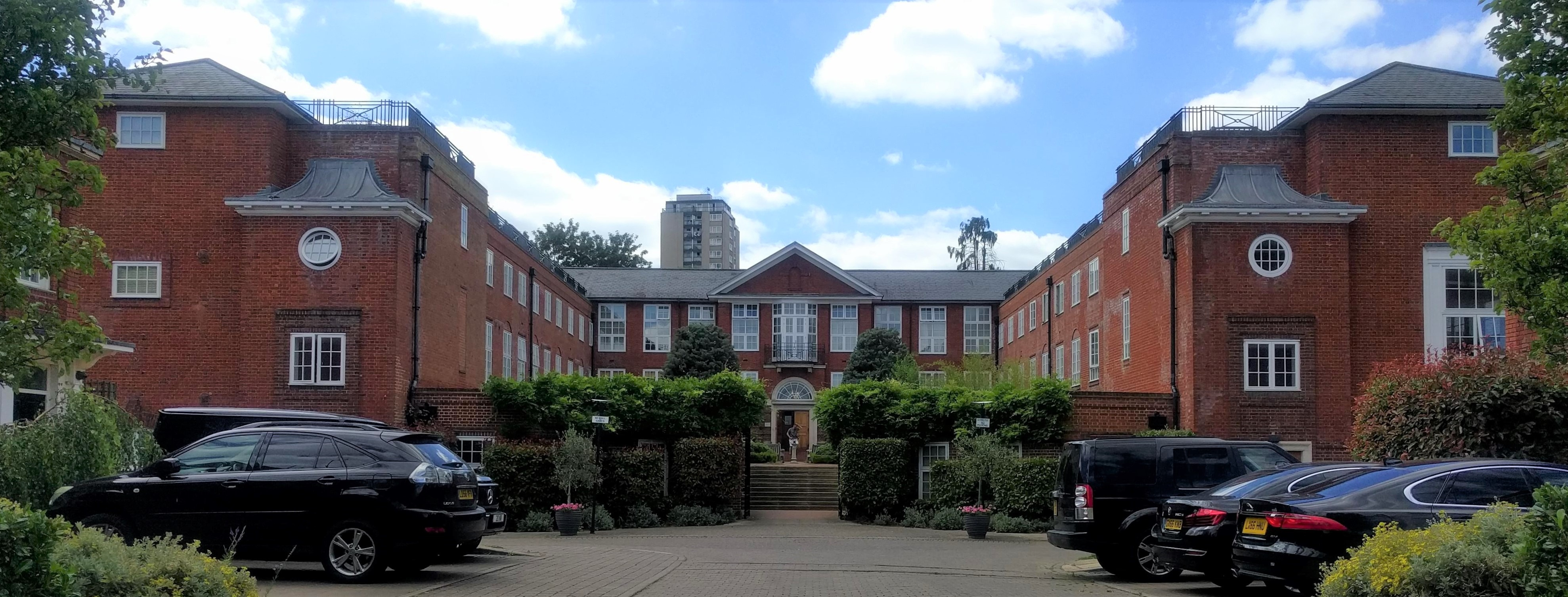
Original 1927 Wandsworth School building in 2019, converted into flats

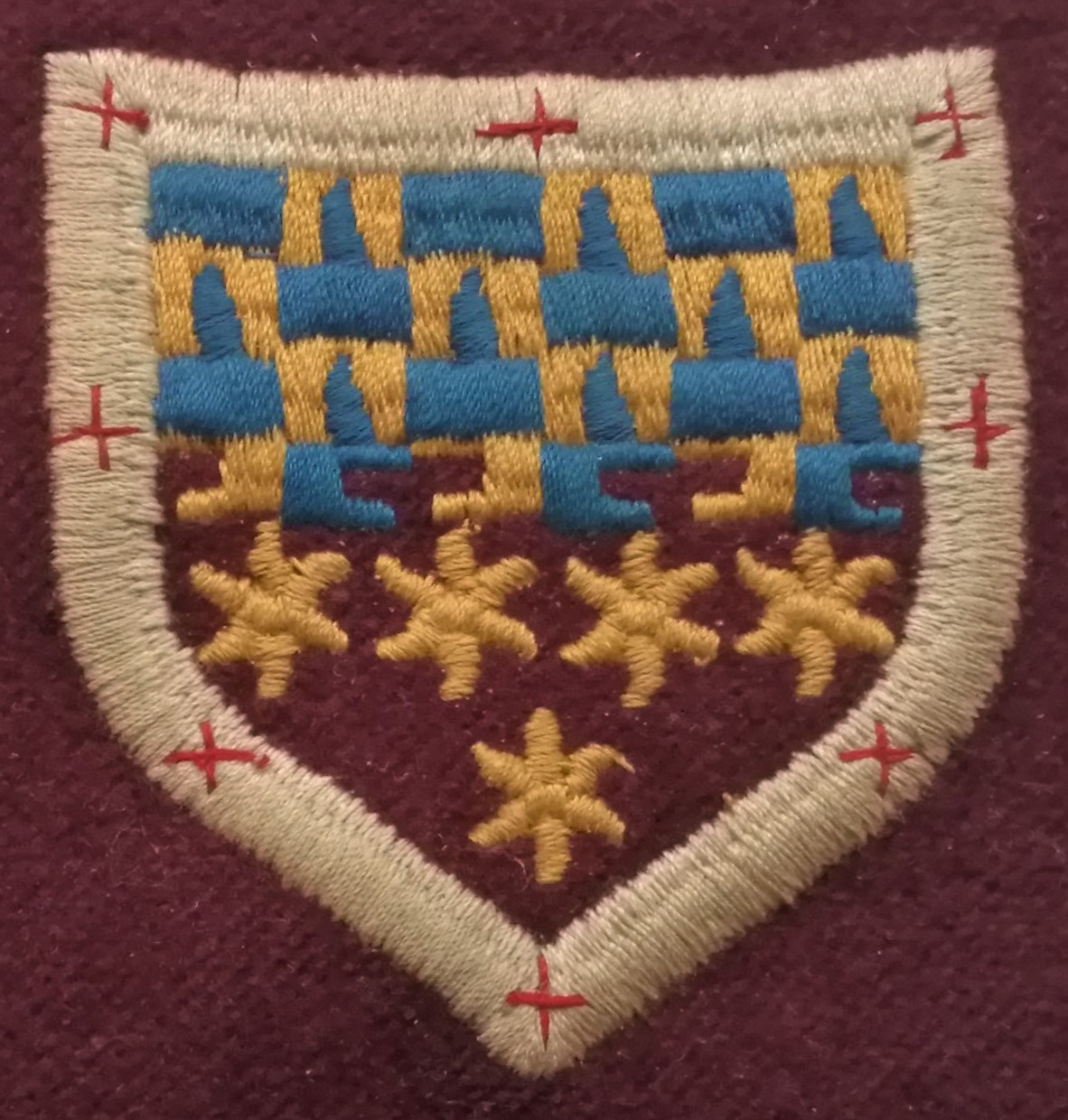
Wandsworth Comprehensive School blazer badge, with the arms of the Metropolitan Borough of Wandsworth

Wandsworth School was a local authority maintained boys' secondary school in Southfields, London. Established in 1895, it became a selective grammar school, then an all-ability comprehensive school, before merging in 1986 and finally closing in 1991. From the 1960s it became well known for its choir.

== History ==
Wandsworth School was founded in 1895 as a Day Science School in adapted premises in Wandsworth High Street, and was renamed Wandsworth Technical Institute Secondary School in 1900. After the passing of the Education Act 1902 the school developed an academic based grammar school curriculum, and in 1908 became the Wandsworth County School. Initially co-educational, the School became boys-only when Mayfield Girls Grammar School opened in 1909. By 1920 the school had over 500 boys and was one of the largest grammar schools in London. In 1927 it moved to a new building in Sutherland Grove in Southfields, and became known as Wandsworth School. During the Second World War, the school was evacuated to Woking and education continued there.

Post war, Wandsworth School began to expand and broaden its intake beyond the academic range. In 1947 the school took over administration of the secondary technical school of the Brixton School of Building, and by 1955 the school had three non-selective first-year groups, in addition to those in the grammar stream. The same year, the London County Council announced that Wandsworth would become one of five new comprehensive schools in London – among the first in the country.

In 1957, Wandsworth School formally became a non-selective boys' comprehensive when it merged with Wandsworth Technical College. As part of these changes, the school expanded to fifteen-form entry with a roll of over 2,100 – reducing to twelve-form entry in the 1960s – with a house system introduced. New buildings were opened on the site's playing fields, including a planetarium, the first in a British school, a swimming pool and workshops for technical and vocational training.

During much of its history Wandsworth School enjoyed continuity of leadership, with only two headmasters in 63 years: H Thwaite from 1900 to 1932, and H. Raymond King from 1932 to 1963. King was a strong advocate of comprehensive education, and led the school's post war expansion. A. E Howard was head from 1963 to 1974. Both King (1963) and Howard (1972) were appointed Commander of the Order of the British Empire.

In 1986, with rolls falling across London, the school merged with Spencer Park School, another boys' comprehensive, and was renamed the John Archer School, after John Archer, the late mayor of Battersea and London's first black mayor. With educational reforms and rolls continuing to decline, the John Archer School closed in 1991. The Sutherland Grove site ceased to be a school and some of the land was made over to housing. The 1950s buildings were demolished, while the original 1927 building was converted into flats. The remaining land was used for a new co-educational secondary school, with Saint Cecilia's Church of England School opening in 2003.

=== Wandsworth School Boys' Choir ===
The 200 strong Wandsworth School Boys' Choir was created and developed by Russell Burgess, Director of Music at the School from 1954 until his death at the age of 48 in 1979. The choir performed at a number of major music festivals, including the Proms and the Aldeburgh Festival, and undertook recordings alongside professional orchestras, including the London Symphony, New Philharmonia, London Philharmonic and the Dutch Concertgebouw. Burgess and the choir had a close association with the composer Benjamin Britten and performed several of his works. In 1972 the choir received the award for the Best Classical Choral Performance at the 14th Annual Grammy Awards, while Russell Burgess was appointed a Member of the Order of the British Empire in the 1975 New Year Honours.

=== Wimbledon Tennis Championships ===
The school was within a mile of the All England Club where the annual Wimbledon Tennis Championships take place. Between 1969 and 1986 the school supplied ball boys for the tournament, with the merged John Archer School continuing the tradition from 1987 until its closure in 1991.

=== Old Wandsworthians Rugby Football Club ===
In 1929 alumni of the school formed the Old Wandsworthians Rugby Football Club which was initially based at their ground on Woodstock Lane in Claygate. The club is now open to all players but remains funded by the Old Wandsworthians Memorial Trust. The club currently fields a 1st XV in the Counties 5 Surrey.

== Notable former pupils ==
=== Wandsworth Technical Institute ===
- Stuart Campbell, journalist and editor of the Sunday Pictorial and The People

=== Wandsworth Grammar School ===
- Leonard Badham, former managing director of J Lyons & Co in the late 1970s
- Allen Carr, author and anti-smoking guru
- Arthur Charlesworth, managing director of Mowlem from 1978 to 1989
- Donald Grant, director general of the Central Office of Information from 1982 to 1985
- Sir John Greenborough, president of the CBI from 1978 to 1980 and of the Institute of Petroleum from 1976 to 1978, and former managing director of Shell-Mex & BP in the early 1970s
- Peter Jewell, professor of physiology of reproduction at the University of Cambridge from 1977 to 1992, and president of The Mammal Society from 1991 to 1993
- Leslie O'Brien, Baron O'Brien of Lothbury, Governor of the Bank of England from 1966 to 1973
- William Roots, chief executive of the City of Westminster from 1994 to 2000
- John Waddington, provost of St Edmundsbury from 1958 to 1976 and grand chaplin of the Royal Masonic Order from 1968
- John Edward Wall, Baron Wall, chairman of EMI, and then of ICL from 1968 to 1972
- Basil Weedon, vice-chancellor of the University of Nottingham from 1976 to 1988
- John Westcott, Professor of Control Systems from 1961 to 1984 at Imperial College London, and President of the Institute of Measurement and Control from 1979 to 1980
- Robert Williamson, professor of medical genetics from 1995 to 2005 at the Faculty of Medicine, Dentistry and Health Sciences, University of Melbourne and director of the Murdoch Children's Research Institute

=== Wandsworth Comprehensive School ===
- Felix Alvarez, a human, civil and LGBT rights activist
- Martin Bashir, TV reporter
- Eric Crees, trombonist
- Simon Emmerson, musician and record producer
- Ainsley Harriott, TV chef
- William "Bill" Hobbs, founder of AFC Wandsworth Youth FC
- Adrian Payce-Drury, writer, photographer and poet
- Phil Hope, Labour MP from 1997 to 2010 for Corby
- Richard Pearson, recipient of the Vierdaagse Cross in gold
- Henry Rzepa, emeritus professor of computational chemistry at Imperial College London
- Jeremy Sanders, professor in the Yusuf Hamied Department of Chemistry, University of Cambridge from 1996 to 2015
- Chris Straker, certified master rug cleaner
- Michael James Anthony Tampin, General Secretary of the Gibraltar General and Clerical Association, (GGCA)
- John Warburton, CEO DoneDeal, International private company
- Christopher Warwick (then Collings), royal biographer and commentator
