= Hibell =

Hibell is a surname. Notable people with the surname include:

- Aaron Hibell (born 1996), English DJ, record producer, composer and electronic artist
- Ian Hibell (1934–2008), British cyclist
