= Torquay Boys' Grammar School =

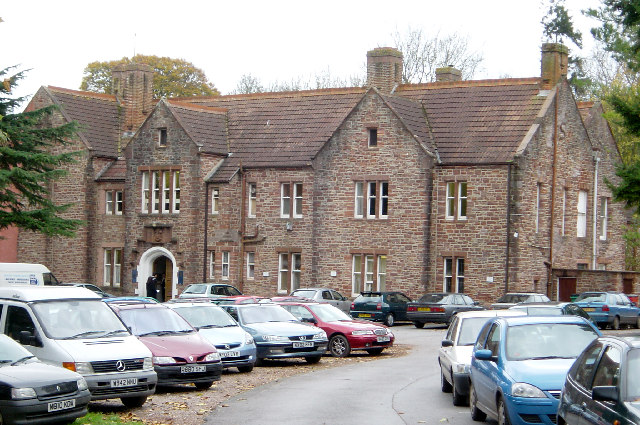
- School badge Torquay Boys' Grammar School

Location
- Shiphay Manor Drive; Torquay, Devon, TQ2 7EL; England; 50°28′34″N 3°33′25″W

Information
- Type: 11–18 boys Grammar school; academy
- Motto: Latin: Aude Sapere; Dare to be Wise
- Established: 1904
- Specialists: Languages, Business and Enterprise
- Department for Education URN: 136321 Tables
- Ofsted: Reports
- Chairman of Governors: Brian Wills Pope
- Head teacher: Doctor J Hunt
- Gender: Boys
- Age: 11 to 18
- Enrolment: 1,093 (2021)
- Houses: Burgh, Dart, Fox Tor, Goodrington, Haldon, Rougemont
- Colour
- Publication: Torquin
- Website: www.tbgs.co.uk

Torquay Boys' Grammar School is an 11–18 selective boys grammar school in Torquay, Devon, England. As of May 2023, it had 1,087 students. The school was founded in 1904. It is in Shiphay, south of Torbay Hospital, not far from the A3022 and Torre railway station and next to Torquay Girls' Grammar School.

== History ==
The school was founded in 1904

=== Second World War ===
St Olave's and St Saviour's Grammar School at Tower Bridge was evacuated to the school, and to South Devon Technical College from September 1939, with headteacher R C Carrington. The St Olave's prize day was held at Torquay Pavilion. St Olave's school returned to London in April 1945.

=== Transfer of the site ===
The site moved to its present location in 1983. As part of its centenary in 2004 the school opened a new hall known as the Cavanna Centenary Hall, which was officially opened in March 2008 by the Earl of Wessex. In September 2010, it gained Academy status.

A long-standing headteacher, Roy Pike, worked for 43 years at the school, 27 years as head. He retired in 2013, and was succeeded by Peter Lawrence.

== Academic attainment ==
In 2022, GCSE examination pass rate between 9-4 stood at 97.6%, with the proportion of top grades 9-7 was 58.6%. The proportion of boys at the school achieving a strong pass in GCSE Level 9–5 in English and Maths was 93%. Torquay Boys' Grammar School has a 99% rate of boys staying in education after leaving the school, or entering employment after Year 11.

== House system ==
Upon joining the school, every student is assigned to one of the school's six houses. The six houses were previously named after Elizabethan sailors, which had seen criticism in 2020 over their links to the slave trade, and were renamed after locations in Devon in 2021.

House Name	Former name	Colour	Ref
Burgh	Blake	Blue	
Dart	Davys	White	
Fox Tor	Frobisher	Yellow	
Goodrington	Gilbert	Green	
Haldon	Hawkins	Purple	
Rougemont	Ralegh	Red	

== Overview ==
=== Grammar School ===
The headteacher and governors of Torquay Boys' Grammar School want the school to retain its grammar school status, arguing that pupils in selective grammar schools make more progress than those in non–selective schools.

The proportion of students attending Torquay Boys' Grammar School who are entitled to free school meals was well below the national average in 2007, despite the school's catchment area not being a prosperous area. The school has held specialist languages status for a number of years and has recently been awarded a second specialism in business and enterprise education.

=== Headteachers ===
- William Jackson 1904–1936
- John W. Harmer 1936 -1966
- Gerald Smith 1966–1981
- Barry K. Hobbs 1981–1986
- Roy E Pike 1987–2013
- Peter Lawrence 2014–2024
- Dr James Hunt 2024–present

=== Observatory ===
The school has its own astronomical observatory. Opened in 1989, it houses a 19.2" (0.5m) Newtonian reflector, and is used by the school itself, by the Torbay Astronomical Society, and is also regularly open to the public.

The astronomer and broadcaster Sir Patrick Moore was a patron of the school and maintained close ties – Ralegh House performed the premiere of his operetta Galileo in the late 1990s. The current presenter of the BBC television programme "The Sky at Night" Chris Lintott, who lectures at Oxford University, was also a student at the school.

== Notable members of staff ==
- Retired teacher Carole Church was awarded the Ted Wragg Teaching Award for Lifetime Achievement in 2004.
- This was followed by retired teacher Dave Berry who was also awarded the Ted Wragg Teaching Award for Lifetime Achievement in 2006.

== Notable former pupils ==
- Sir Roger Deakins, multiple BAFTA and two-time Academy Award-winning cinematographer.
- Ben Howard, singer-songwriter, musician and composer.
- Mike Sangster, former British No. 1 tennis player.
- Chris Lintott, Professor of Astrophysics at Oxford University and The Sky at Night presenter.
- Sonny Baker, Hampshire, Manchester Originals and England cricketer.
- Yorick Wilks, pioneer professor of Artificial Intelligence applied to language processing on a computer.
- Raymond Cattell, psychologist and pioneer of psychometric testing.
- Sam Skinner (rugby union), professional rugby union player for Edinburgh Rugby and Scotland national rugby union team.
- Chris Read, cricketer who played as wicket-keeper for the England cricket team.
- Steve Ridgway, former CEO of Virgin Atlantic.
- Mike Davis (rugby union), former England national rugby union team player.
- Sir Ray Tindle, newspaper and radio entrepreneur. Founder of the Tindle Group of regional newspapers and radio stations.
- Ian Hibell, long-distance cyclist, the first person to cycle from the southernmost to the northernmost point of the Americas.
- Will Jenkins Davies, Professional Footballer for Plymouth Argyle.
- Martin Turner, rock musician, Wishbone Ash.
- Neil Collings, eminent Church of England priest who was Dean of St Edmundsbury.
- Hiley Edwards, cricketer who played for and captained Devon County Cricket Club.
- Richard Leaman, CEO of The Guide Dogs for the Blind Association and former senior Royal Navy officer.
- Ted Luscombe, Bishop of Brechin (1975–90), Primus of the Scottish Episcopal Church (1985–1990).
- Terence Frederick Mitchell, Professor of Linguistics and Phonetics, University of Leeds.
- Harry Robinson, World War II veteran and Distinguished Service Order (DSO) recipient.
- Adrian Sanders, Liberal Democrat MP for Torbay between 1997 and 2015.
- Professor David Southwood, Science Director of the European Space Agency, President of the Royal Astronomical Society, Head of Physics Department Imperial College.
- Bill Strang, Chief Engineer at the British Aircraft Corporation (BAC) from 1960 to 1967, and UK Technical Director of Concorde from 1966 to 1977.
- Doc Rowe, folklorist, author and film-maker, prominent lecturer on and advocate for folk traditions and folk music.
- Neil Oram, musician, poet, artist, and playwright.
- Peter Bradshaw (aeronautical engineer), aeronautical engineer specialising in fluid mechanics.
- Alex Fletcher, professional footballer for Bath City.
