= Saint Cecilia's Church of England School =

Location
- Sutherland Grove; London, SW18 5JR; England; 51°26′51″N 0°12′30″W

Information
- Type: Academy
- Religious affiliation: Church of England
- Established: 2003
- Local authority: Wandsworth
- Department for Education URN: 141808 Tables
- Ofsted: Reports
- Headteacher: Renata Joseph
- Gender: Coeducational
- Age: 11 to 18
- Enrolment: 950
- Colours: Burgundy, Green and Grey
- Diocese: Southwark
- Website: http://www.saintcecilias.london/

Two girls in Saint Cecilia's Church of England School uniforms

Saint Cecilia's Church of England School (commonly referred to as 'Saint Cecilia's') is a Church of England secondary school in Southfields, south-west London. It opened in 2003 as Saint Cecilia's, Wandsworth Church of England School, and was renamed on 1 March 2015. Music and Mathematics are the school's specialisms.

== History ==
It opened as a voluntary aided school in September 2003 with one year group of 150 pupils. It has been growing incrementally year by year until it reached 750 pupils across Years 7 to 11 in the 2007/2008 academic year. It opened its sixth form in 2008. There are now approximately 900 pupils and students at the school including Sixth Formers. The School won the 2010 Schools Question Time Challenge.

In March 2015 the school converted to academy status.

In 2019, the school launched the Saint Cecilia's Rugby Academy as a partnership with Premier Rugby Club, London Irish. Each year, 26 boys from the Sixth Form will train with the professionals whilst studying for A Levels and BTECs at the school.

=== Former school on the site ===
Saint Cecilia's occupies a part of the site of the former Wandsworth School, a boys' secondary school that merged to become John Archer School in 1986, before finally closing in 1991. Some of the former school's land was sold off for housing, with the original 1927 building converted into flats. Proceeds from the sale of the land helped to finance the £12.4 million cost of building Saint Cecilia's on the southern part of the site.

== Admissions ==
Saint Cecilia's Church of England School now admits 180 pupils into Year 7 each year. The school participates in the coordinated admission scheme of Wandsworth Council. Saint Cecilia's also adheres to the common timetable for admissions including the arrangements for dealing with applications received after the closing date as set out in Wandsworth Council's scheme.

== School life ==
=== Academic life ===
Saint Cecilia's Church of England school caters for pupils of all genders aged 11 to 18.

=== House System ===
In July 2009 it was announced the school would begin a house system. In September 2009 five houses were introduced. They were (with house colours later voted for by the pupils of each house):

- Schubert (Canary Yellow)
- Archimedes (Royal Purple)
- Ives (Crimson Red)
- Newton (Prussian Blue)
- Turing (Lime Green)

In 2021, a sixth house, Carter, was launched, named after famed jazz musician, Betty Carter. Its house colour is bright orange. The house names spell S-A-I-N-T-C.

=== Sixth Form ===
In September 2008 the school expansion led to the opening of the school's sixth form. The Sixth Form caters for around 200 pupils across both the Lower and Upper Sixth.

=== Academic performance ===
Saint Cecilia's A Level results are consistent with the average for the borough, though they fall below the national average. The school's GCSE results align with the borough average but exceed the national average.

=== Sport ===
The school has rugby, netball, athletics and football teams that take part in weekly local and regional competitions. Every year, pupils are given the option to take part in the Wimbledon Championships Ball Boys and Girls.

== Sources ==
- Rough-sleeping schoolchildren raise more than £3,000 for the homeless
- Schools win Question Time Challenge
- 2020 - The Diocese of Southwark
- Students celebrate A-level results
- Balham People | Wandsworth GCSE results continue to improve
