= Fanfare for St Edmundsbury =

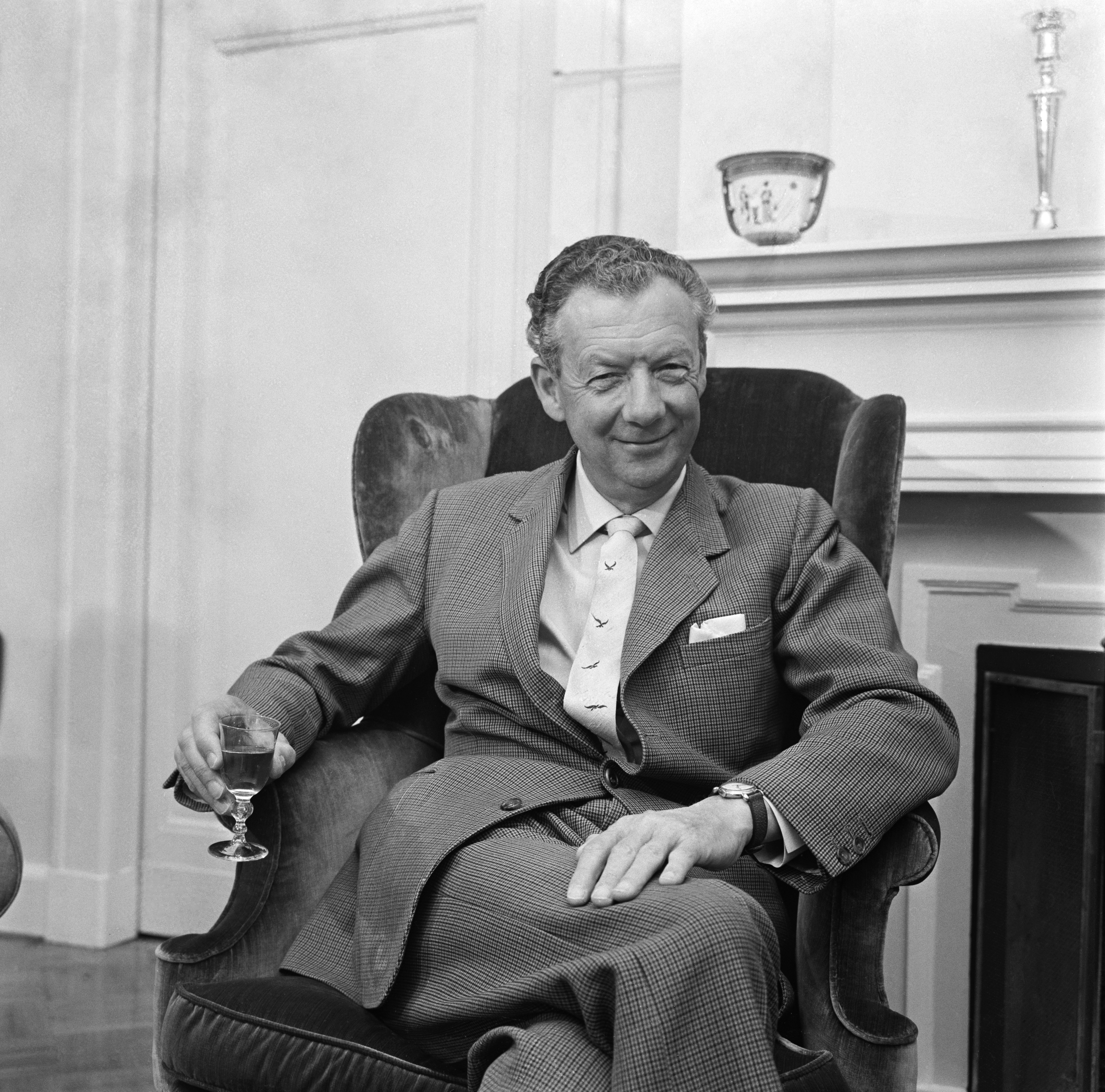
Benjamin Britten in 1965

The Fanfare for St Edmundsbury is a fanfare for three trumpets written by the British composer Benjamin Britten for a "Pageant of Magna Carta" in the grounds of St Edmundsbury Cathedral, Bury St Edmunds in 1959.

== Technical ==
The fanfare is scored for three trumpets. The parts are notated for modern trumpets in C; however, they are actually written using only the notes of three different harmonic series based on F, C and D and could thus be performed on three natural trumpets in those three keys. The natural trumpets were not specified by the composer; indeed it may have been a bit early in the rediscovery of natural trumpet playing for it to be safe to do so.

This technique had been used by the classical composers in horn section writing, to enable lines to be played outside the natural scale (e.g. 2 horns in C and 2 horns in D or E♭). Some of the first experimentation of this technique is demonstrated by F.G.A. Dauvernè from around 1850. Dauvernè was Arban's teacher (the father of modern-day trumpeting) and wrote one of the last methods for the dying art of natural trumpet playing, including some of the first exercises for the cornet and valved trumpet. Nevertheless, the scoring is sometimes taken as signal enough to justify playing it on natural trumpets, on which it works well.

This multitonal use of natural instruments is an interesting trick which might have caused some surprise at the height of the natural trumpet's power in the Baroque era, when three playing together would almost always have been in the same key. Performance of the fanfare on modern valved instruments remains the norm and does not lessen the effect: the parts still feel like natural trumpet lines. Britten commented, "The trumpeters should be placed as far apart as possible, even when the Fanfare is played indoors."

== Description ==
Each trumpet plays one solo "verse" in turn. These are not only separated from each other in key but also in style: although they all include some long notes at phrase ends, overall one is a bouncy 6/8, one a martial-sounding, bold statement, and one a series of smooth arpeggios. So when they all come in together at the end and play their verses simultaneously the initial effect seems chaotic. As the last playthrough progresses it gradually dawns on the listener that a unity is emerging from the chaos as the long notes start to settle and overlap: by the last few bars the three trumpets are playing triumphant block chords together.

== Recordings ==
Many recordings are available, but nearly always on compilations of modern brass or fanfare music – the piece is so short that it almost never receives separate billing. Recordings have been made by the Philip Jones Brass Ensemble and similar groups.
