= Joe Hawes =

British Anglican priest (born 1965)

The Very Reverend Joseph Hawes
- Dean of St Edmundsbury
- Church: Church of England
- Diocese: Diocese of St Edmundsbury and Ipswich
- In office: 2018–present
- Predecessor: Frances Ward
- Other post: Vicar of All Saints Church, Fulham (2003–2018)

Orders
- Ordination: 1991 (deacon); 1992 (priest)

Personal details
- Born: Joseph Patricius Hawes; 1965 (age 60–61)
- Denomination: Anglicanism
- Partner: Chris Eyden
- Education: St Chad's College, Durham; St Stephen's House, Oxford; King's College London

Joseph Patricius Hawes (born 1965) is a British Anglican priest. Since 2018, he has been the Dean of St Edmundsbury. From 2003 to 2018, he was Vicar of All Saints Church, Fulham in the Diocese of London. His early parish ministry was spent in the Diocese of Southwark.

== Early life and education ==
Hawes was born in 1965 and brought up in Hampstead, London, England. He studied English at St Chad's College, Durham, graduating with a Bachelor of Arts (BA) degree in 1987. Following graduation, he lived in a community at St Albans Abbey and explored his call to ordination. From 1988 to 1991, he trained for ordination and studied theology at St Stephen's House, Oxford, an Anglo-Catholic theological college. He later continued his studies at King's College London, and completed a Master of Arts (MA) degree in 2012.

== Ordained ministry ==
Hawes was ordained in the Church of England as a deacon in 1991 and as a priest in 1992. From 1991 to 1996, he served his curacy with the Clapham Team Ministry in the Diocese of Southwark. From 1996 to 1997, he was priest in charge of St Michael and All Angels Church, Barnes. Following the creation of the Barnes Team Ministry, which absorbed St Michael and All Angels, he was a team vicar from 1997 to 2003. During his time with St Michael and All Angels, he was involved in restoring the Victorian building and introduced a family service. In 2003, he joined All Saints Church, Fulham, having been appointed Vicar of Fulham. During his time at All Saints, he grew the congregation to more than 500 people each Sunday. In 2011, he was additionally made an honorary canon of the Cathedral of the Holy Cross, Gaborone, the cathedral of the Anglican Diocese of Botswana.

On 15 March 2018, it was announced that Hawes would be the next Dean of St Edmundsbury, the head of the chapter of St Edmundsbury Cathedral and the senior priest in the Diocese of St Edmundsbury and Ipswich. He was installed as dean on 14 July 2018.

=== Views ===
Hawes belongs to the Liberal Catholic tradition of the Church of England. In February 2012, he signed an open letter that stated the following:

We, the undersigned, believe that on the issue of holding civil partnership ceremonies in Church of England churches incumbents / priests in charge should be accorded the same rights as they enjoy at present in the matter of officiating at the marriage of divorced couples in church. Namely, that this should be a matter for the individual conscience of the incumbent/priest in charge.

== Personal life ==
Hawes, who is gay, met his partner Chris Eyden while training at St Stephen's House, Oxford. He is in a civil partnership with Eyden, who was the vicar of All Saints' Church, Putney Common, and who moved to Suffolk in 2019 to become interim parish priest of Haverhill with Withersfield and a formation adviser.
