= Miles Mosse =

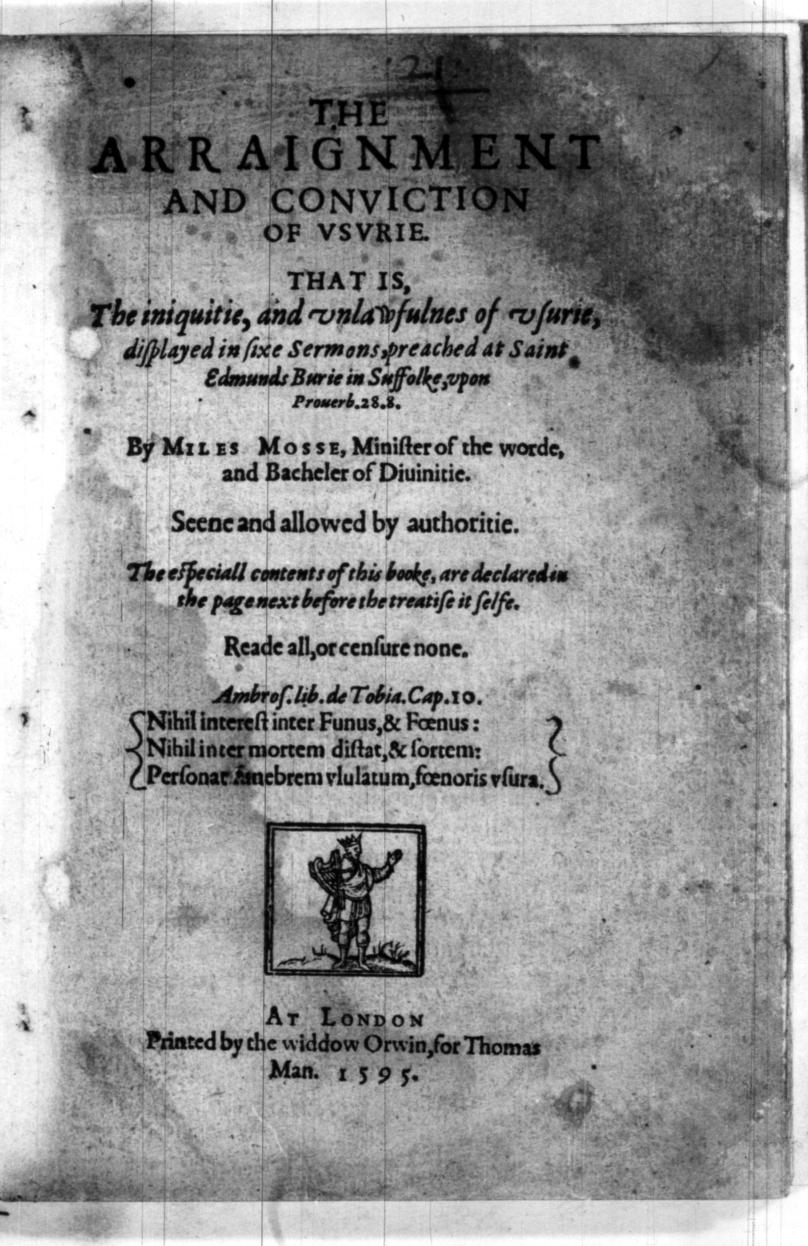
The arraignment and conviction of usurie, 1595, printed by Widow Orwin

Miles Mosse (1558–1615) was an English minister and theological writer most noted for founding the library at St James Church, Bury St Edmunds in 1595 which subsequently became the St Edmundsbury Cathedral Library.

Appointed preacher at St James' Church in 1586, he received £48 per annum from the feoffees of Bury St Edmunds.

In 1595 his book, The arraignment and conviction of usurie, was printed by Joan Orwin.
