= St Michael and All Angels Church, Barnes =

Coordinates: 51.470625°N 0.252841°W

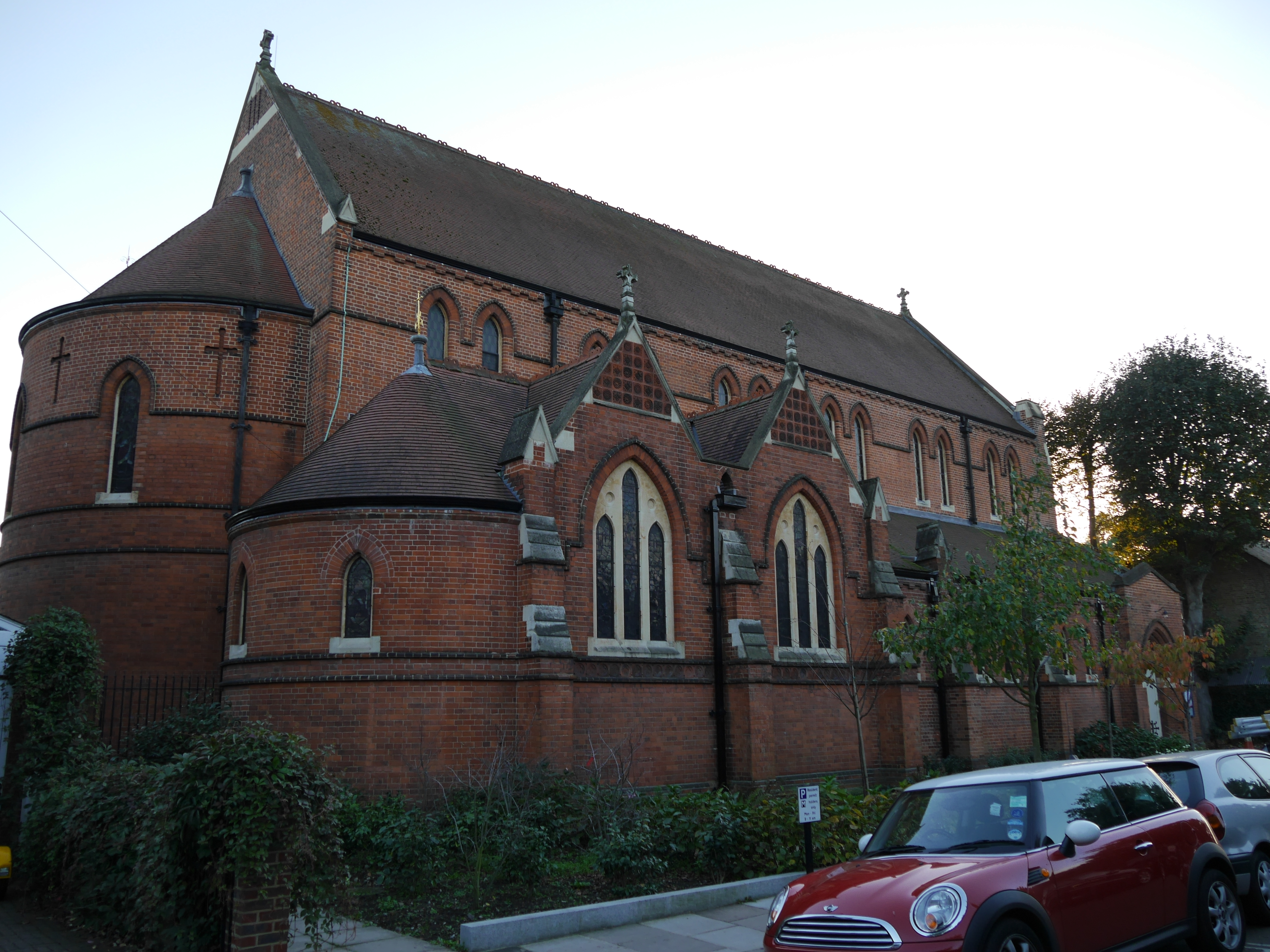
- Location: Barnes in the London Borough of Richmond upon Thames
- Country: England
- Denomination: Church of England
- Website: www.stmichaelbarnes.org

History
- Founded: 1867 (congregation); 1891 (building)

Architecture
- Functional status: Active
- Architect: Charles Innes
- Completed: 1893

Administration
- Diocese: Southwark
- Archdeaconry: Wandsworth
- Deanery: Richmond & Barnes

Clergy
- Vicar: Fr Stephen Stavrou

Listed Building – Grade II
- Official name: Church of St Michael and All Angels
- Designated: 29 September 2000
- Reference no.: 1389297

St Michael and All Angels Church is a Grade II listed Church of England church in Barnes in the London Borough of Richmond upon Thames. It is located at 39 Elm Bank Gardens, London SW13 0NX.

== History ==
The congregation, founded in 1867, initially met in a building in Archway Street that combined a school and a church. A temporary tin tabernacle was erected next to the school in 1878.

The current building was erected in 1891–93. The architect was Charles Innes, a member of the congregation, who also designed the additions to the nave, chancel and north aisle of St Mary's Church, Barnes.

A vestry, in a matching style, was added in 1936.

== Barbara Pym ==
The novelist Barbara Pym lived in Barnes from 1949 to 1961. She worshipped at St Michael's, and was a member of the Parochial Church Council. London Anglo-Catholic churches feature prominently in Pym's novels, and St Michael's is the model for the church in her 1955 novel Less Than Angels, where Pym describes High Mass on Whitsunday:

So as to make sure of their favourite seat they had arrived rather too early, and there was nothing to do but look around the church which, like so many suburban churches, had been built at the beginning of the present century and had no ancient monuments or outstanding architectural features. Everything that could be was beautifully polished, from the altar candlesticks and lectern to the memorial tablets to late vicars, Ernest Hugh la Motte Spofford, George William Brandon, and James Edward Ferguson Law. The present incumbent, Laurence Folkes Tulliver, could not expect to be immortalized in brass for some years to come, for he was a man in vigorous early middle age who had introduced into the services many features which were new and startling to his congregation. He had been wise enough to do this gradually, so that by the time the church had won the right to have the mysterious letters DSCR after its name in Mowbray's Church Guide, most of the congregation were rather proud of themselves for having become High Church almost without knowing it. ... As it was a Festival the servers were in their lace-trimmed cottas and Father Tulliver was wearing a particularly splendid cope.

== Notable clergy ==
- Joe Hawes, later Dean of St Edmundsbury, served as priest-in-charge, and then team vicar, from 1996 to 2003
- Bruce Ruddock, later Director of the Anglican Centre in Rome, served as priest-in-charge from 1988 to 1995
