= Ian Hibell =

English touring cyclist

Ian Hibell (6 January 1934 – 23 August 2008) was an English touring cyclist who spent nearly 40 years bicycling in various parts of the world, accomplishing many firsts in cycling.

== Early life and education ==
Hibell, who was born in the Epsom district in Surrey, lived in Brixham, Devon, England and attended Torquay Boys' Grammar School. From 1971 through 1973 he became the first to cycle from Cape Horn to Alaska.

== Career ==
Hibell co-authored a book entitled Into the Remote Places (with Clinton Trowbridge) documenting his travels. He lectured on his travels in Great Britain and the United States, including at Yale University. He also designed some of his own gear, including front and rear luggage racks.

Ian Hibell began cycle-touring when not all his family could afford to travel to a seaside holiday by train. He and his father cycled there, sleeping on park benches and anywhere else they could find. He worked at Standard Telephones and Cables and took leave to go cycling, eventually riding more than he was working. He went on to ride the equivalent of ten times round the equator, covering 6,000 miles a year. He is recognised as first to cycle the Darién Gap in Panama and from south to north of the Americas. He also rode from Norway to the Cape of Good Hope and from Bangkok to Vladivostok.

A van drove over his arm and hand in China in 2006. He came close to losing his life after losing his bicycle while riding across the Sahara. He recounted how he was saved by wandering Arabs, who could see his bicycle even though he couldn't, and that all he had with which to reward them was a tube of sun cream, "which I didn't think they would particularly need."

His favourite bike had a Freddie Grubb frame of Reynolds 531 tubing, reinforced for extra weight. In his book, "Into the Remote Places" (1984), he called his bike a companion, crutch and friend. "The quiet hum of the wheels, the creak of strap against load, the clink of something in the pannier", was "delicious".

== Death ==
Hibell was killed on 23 August 2008 in Greece by a hit and run driver on the Athens-Salonika Highway near Nea Erithrea.
