= Neil Collings =

Neil Collings (1946–2010) was an eminent Church of England priest who was Dean of St Edmundsbury.

== Education and career ==
He was born on 26 August 1946 and educated at Torquay Boys' Grammar School and King's College London and ordained in 1970. After this he was Curate, then Vicar of Exmouth. Later he was Director of Ordinands for the Diocese of Hereford and then Rector of Harpenden. In 1999 he was made Canon Treasurer of Exeter Cathedral. In 2006 he became Dean of St Edmundsbury, retiring through ill health in 2009. While at St Edmundsbury Cathedral, he organised the 2009 Royal Maundy.

== Freemasonry ==
Collings was one of the most prominent clerical Freemasons of his era. Initiated in the Earl of Mornington Lodge (London) in 1978, he went on to belong to more than a dozen lodges. He served as a Lodge Chaplain, and later as Provincial Grand Chaplain in both the Provinces of Hertfordshire and Devonshire, subsequently becoming Assistant Provincial Grand Master of Hertfordshire. In the United Grand Lodge of England he was appointed Assistant Grand Chaplain in 1988, Deputy Grand Chaplain in 1996, and Grand Chaplain in 1999. In 2003 he was given the honorary appointment of Past Junior Grand Warden.

In Holy Royal Arch Freemasonry he was appointed Third Grand Principal, one of the three rulers of Royal Arch Masonry, in 2002, serving in that office until his death in 2010.

Less than a year before his death Collings urged his fellow Freemasons to be bold in proclaiming their membership of the fraternity, stating "I believe that it is time that we, as English Freemasons, re-examined our roots and the things we do. In our dealings with individuals and organisations we need confidence in explaining and commending ourselves."

== Death ==
He died on 26 June 2010, following a protracted illness.
