= John White (provost of St Edmundsbury) =

Anglican priest (1885-1958)

John Lawrence White (1885–1958) was an Anglican priest in the 20th century. He was born in 1885 and ordained in 1910. He held curacies in Birmingham, Brixton and Luton after which he served as a chaplain to the British Armed Forces during World War I. He was appointed in February 1917, and served in King George Hospital, London and, from December 1917, in Egypt, surviving the torpedoing of the troopship he was travelling on. His work was regarded as "satisfactory". He was demobilised in March 1920. Later he was Vicar of St. George's Church, Edgbaston and then of St Nicolas Church, Nuneaton. In 1940 he became Provost of St Edmundsbury, a post he held until his death on 24 May 1958. There is a commemorative plaque in the Cathedral cloisters.
