= John Orpen =

Anglican priest (1868–1950)

John Herbert Orpen (30 September 1868 – 3 December 1950) was an Anglican priest in the 20th century.

He was born on 30 September 1868, educated at Selwyn College, Cambridge, and ordained for service in the Diocese of Liverpool in 1894. He held curacies in Toxteth, Beeston and Ross-on-Wye. After this he served incumbencies at Burton, Pembrokeshire, Thurston and Melton. He was commissioned as a Temporary Chaplain to the Forces on 1 October 1918, and was attached to the 1st London Reserve Brigade in Eastern Command. A son was killed in July, 1916, serving as an officer with the Lancashire Fusiliers. In 1929 he became Provost of St Edmundsbury, a post he held until 1940. From then until his death on 3 December 1950 he was Rector of Fornham All Saints.
