= Dean of St Edmundsbury =

Religious position in England

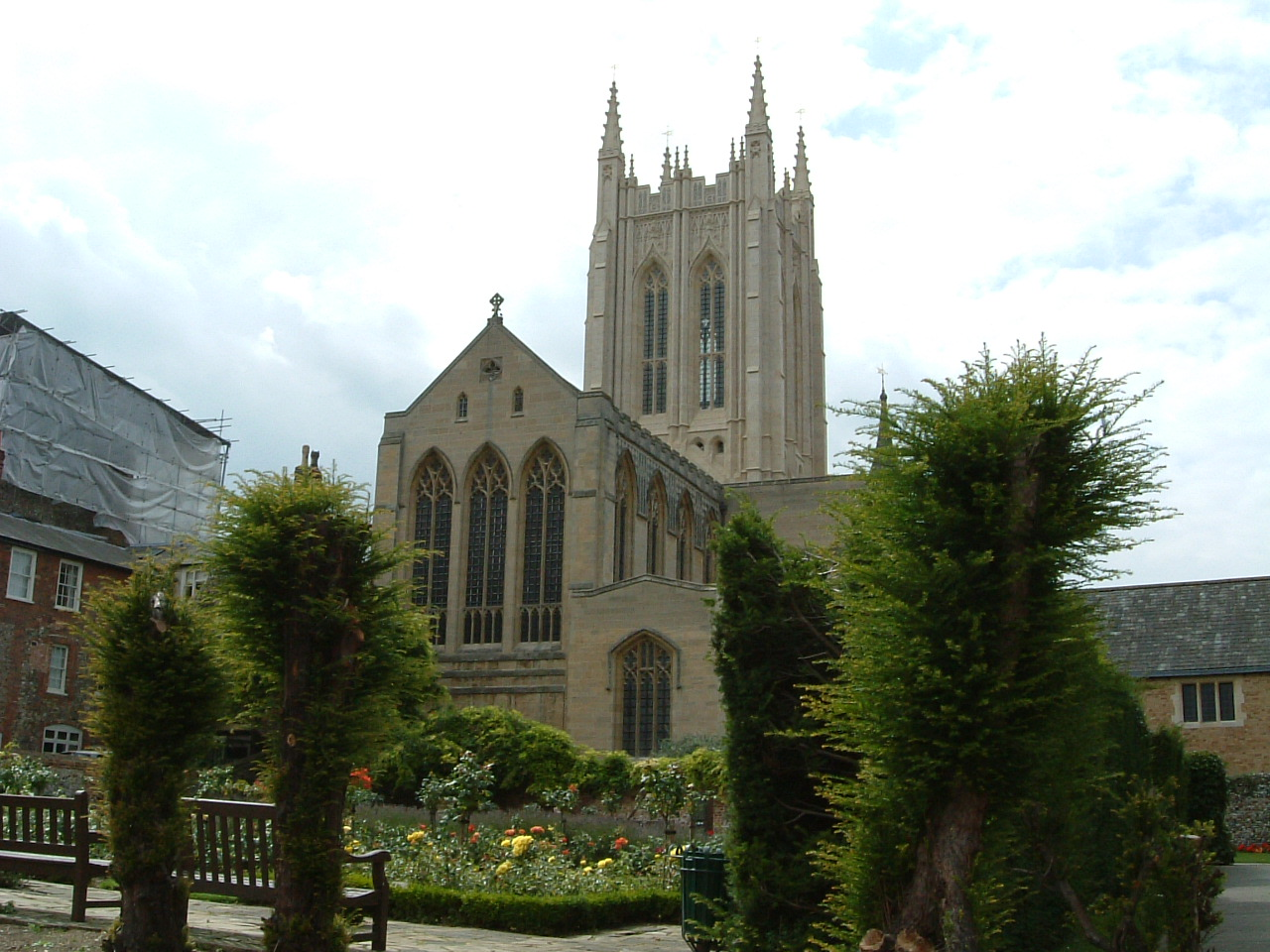
St Edmundsbury Cathedral

The Dean of St Edmundsbury is the head (primus inter pares – first among equals) and chair of the chapter of canons, the ruling body of St Edmundsbury Cathedral. The dean and chapter are based at the Cathedral Church of Saint James in Bury St Edmunds. Before 2000 the post was designated as a provost, which was then the equivalent of a dean at most English cathedrals. The cathedral is the mother church of the Diocese of St Edmundsbury and Ipswich and seat of the Bishop of St Edmundsbury and Ipswich. The current dean is Joe Hawes.

== List of deans ==
=== Provosts ===
- 1929–1940 John Herbert Orpen
- 1940–1958 John White
- 1958–1976 John Waddington
- 1976–1981 David Maddock
- 1981–1994 Raymond Furnell
- 1995–19 November 2000 James Atwell (became Dean)

=== Deans ===
- 19 November 2000–2006 James Atwell
- 2006–2009 Neil Collings
- 16 October 2010 – October 2017 Frances Ward
- October 2017 – 14 July 2018 Graeme Knowles (acting)
- 14 July 2018 – present: Joe Hawes
