= St Edmundsbury Cathedral =

Coordinates: 52°14′38″N 0°43′00″E

- Cathedral Church of St James and St Edmund
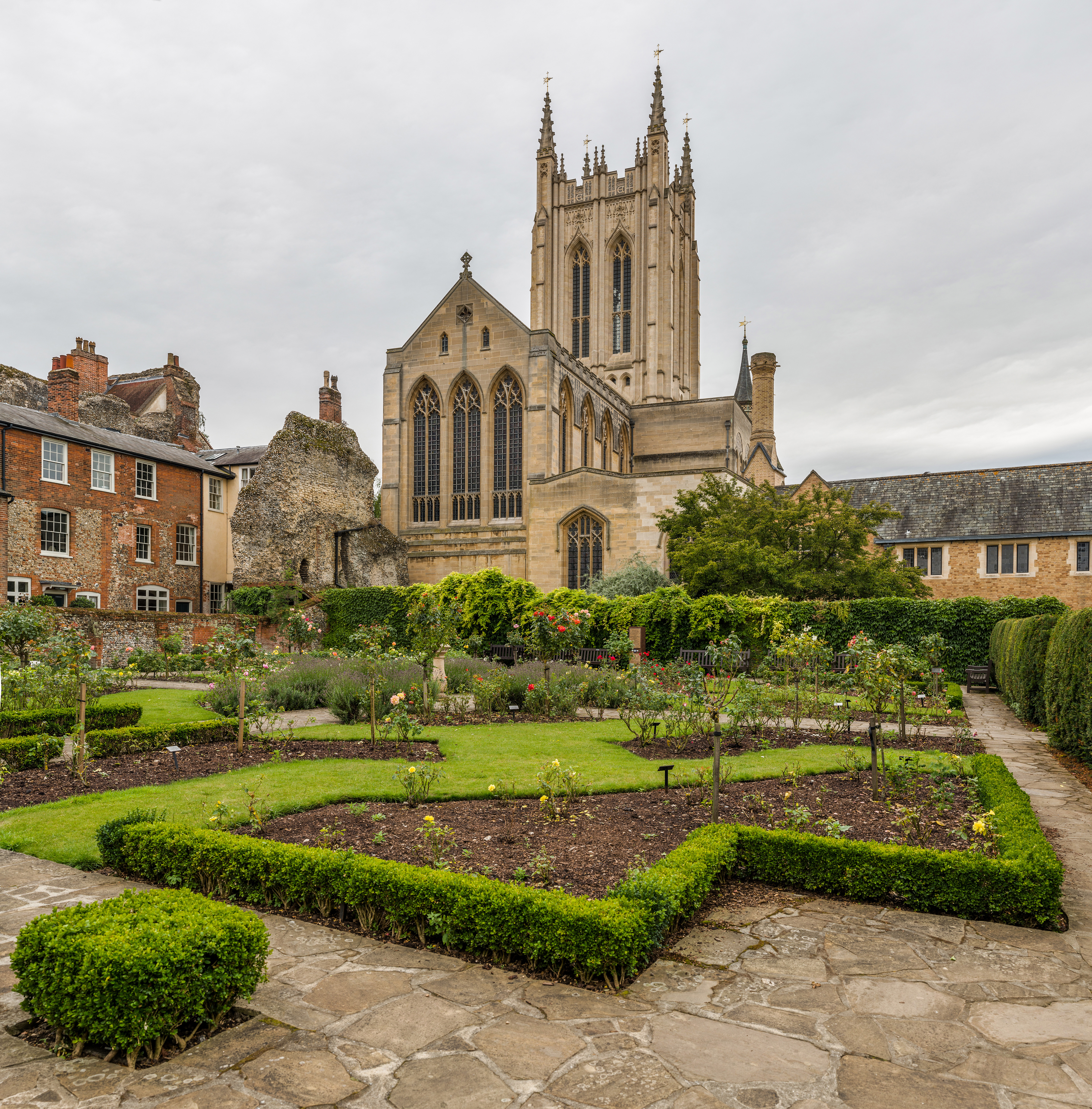
- Cathedral from the east

- Shown within Suffolk
- Location: Bury St Edmunds, Suffolk
- Country: England
- Denomination: Church of England
- Previous denomination: Roman Catholic
- Tradition: Liberal Anglo-Catholicism
- Website: https://stedscathedral.org

History
- Status: Cathedral

Architecture
- Functional status: Active
- Heritage designation: Grade I
- Designated: 7 August 1952
- Architectural type: Church
- Style: Romanesque, Gothic, Gothic Revival
- Years built: 11th–16th centuries, 18th–19th centuries, 21st century
- Groundbreaking: 11th century
- Completed: 2007

Administration
- Province: Canterbury
- Diocese: St Edmundsbury & Ipswich

Clergy
- Bishop: Joanne Grenfell
- Vicar(s): vacant; position not in use
- Dean: Joseph Hawes

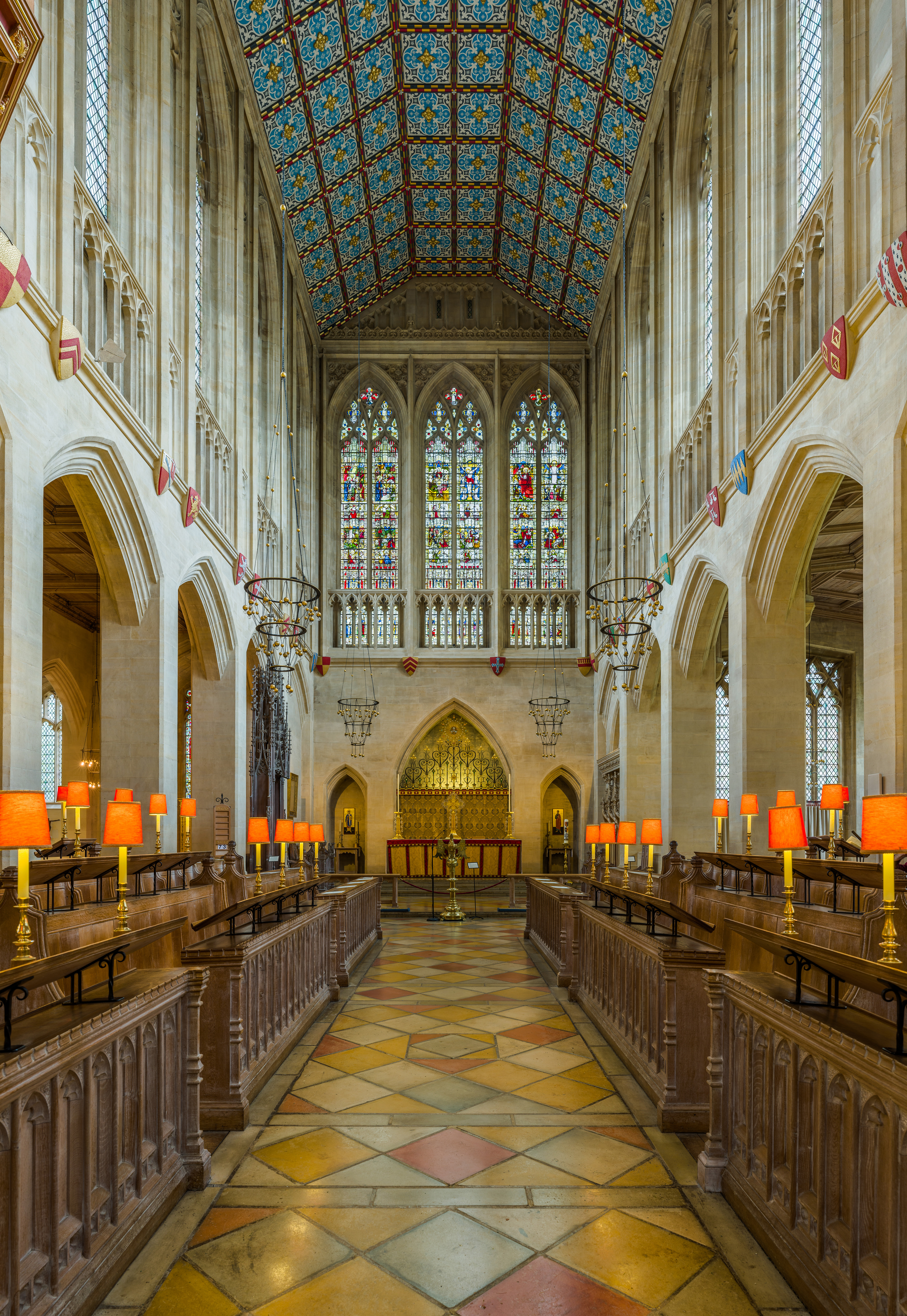
The choir, looking east towards the high altar

St Edmundsbury Cathedral (formally entitled the Cathedral Church of St James and St Edmund) is the cathedral for the Church of England's Diocese of St Edmundsbury and Ipswich. It is the seat of the Bishop of St Edmundsbury and Ipswich and is in Bury St Edmunds in Suffolk. Originating in the 11th century, it was rebuilt in the 12th and 16th centuries as a parish church and became a cathedral in 1914; it has been considerably enlarged in recent decades.

== History ==
A church has stood on the site of the cathedral since at least 1065, when St Denis's Church was built within the precincts of Bury St Edmunds Abbey. In the early 12th century the Abbot, Anselm, had wanted to make a pilgrimage along the Way of St James to Santiago de Compostela. He was unsuccessful and instead rebuilt St Denis's and dedicated the new church to Saint James, which served as the parish church for the north side of Bury St Edmunds. Anselm was also responsible for building the abbey gate tower, known today as the Norman Tower, alongside St James's, which also served as the church's belfry and it continues in this function to the present day. The church is located about 200 yards from St Mary's Church, which is of a similar size.

This church was largely rebuilt, starting in 1503, in the Perpendicular style by John Wastell, a master mason who also worked on King's College, Cambridge. Further alterations to the building were undertaken in the 18th and 19th centuries, notably a new chancel and a hammerbeam roof by George Gilbert Scott. When the Diocese of St Edmundsbury and Ipswich was created in 1914, St James's Church was made the cathedral. In 1959 Benjamin Britten wrote the Fanfare for St Edmundsbury for a "Pageant of Magna Carta" held in the cathedral grounds.

From 1959 onwards there was renewed building work designed to transform the former parish church into a cathedral building. Between 1959 and 1970, the Victorian chancel was demolished and replaced with a new quire, a cloister was added on the west side; also transepts, a Lady chapel and a side chapel dedicated to St Edmund were built. The cathedral architect from 1943 to 1988 was Stephen Dykes Bower and he left £2 million for the completion of the cathedral. In the cathedral grounds a new choir school and visitor's centre, which were opened in 1990, were built by Dykes Bower's successor, Alan Rome. Work started on a Gothic Revival style tower in 2000; funded by the Millennium Commission, the Stephen Dykes Bower Trust and others, the Millennium Tower was designed by Hugh Mathew, an associate of Dykes Bower. The 150 foot (46 metre) structure was built from 600,000 bricks and faced with Barnack and Clipsham stone. Its completion was officially celebrated on 22 July 2005. Further additions are the Chapel of the Transfiguration and the East Cloister, both completed in 2009, and the Crypt Treasury in 2012.

== Interior ==
The font was designed in 1870 by George Gilbert Scott, constructed on a medieval shaft, with a cover by Frank Ernest Howard of Oxford. The decoration was added in 1960. A painting, "The Martyrdom of St Edmund" by Brian Whelan hangs in the Lady Chapel. A sculpture by Elisabeth Frink entitled Crucifixion stands by the Treasury steps. Stained glass in the cathedral includes the medieval Susanna Window which has Flemish glass in the lower section and English glass at the top. The west window depicts the Last Judgement and dates from about 1900.

In addition to guided tours of the cathedral itself, visitors can view changing exhibits of art in the Edmund Gallery, and an exhibit of historic and religious regalia and artefacts in the Cathedral Treasures display.

== Dean and chapter ==
The Dean of St Edmundsbury is the head (primus inter pares — first among equals) and chair of the chapter of canons, the ruling body of the cathedral. Before 2000 the post was designated as a provost, which was then the equivalent of a dean at most English cathedrals. The first provost was John Orpen.

As of 31 January 2026, the clergy are:

- Dean — Joe Hawes (installed 14 July 2018)
- Sub-Dean & Canon Pastor — Matthew Vernon (Sub-Dean since 18 November 2012 licensing; Canon Pastor since 8 February 2009)
- Canon Precentor — Katy Cunliffe (since 1 June 2025 installation)
- Canon Theologian — Victoria Johnson (since 17 November 2024 installation)

The cathedral, which is also a parish church, has not filled the position of Vicar since 2005.

== Organ and organists ==
=== Organ ===
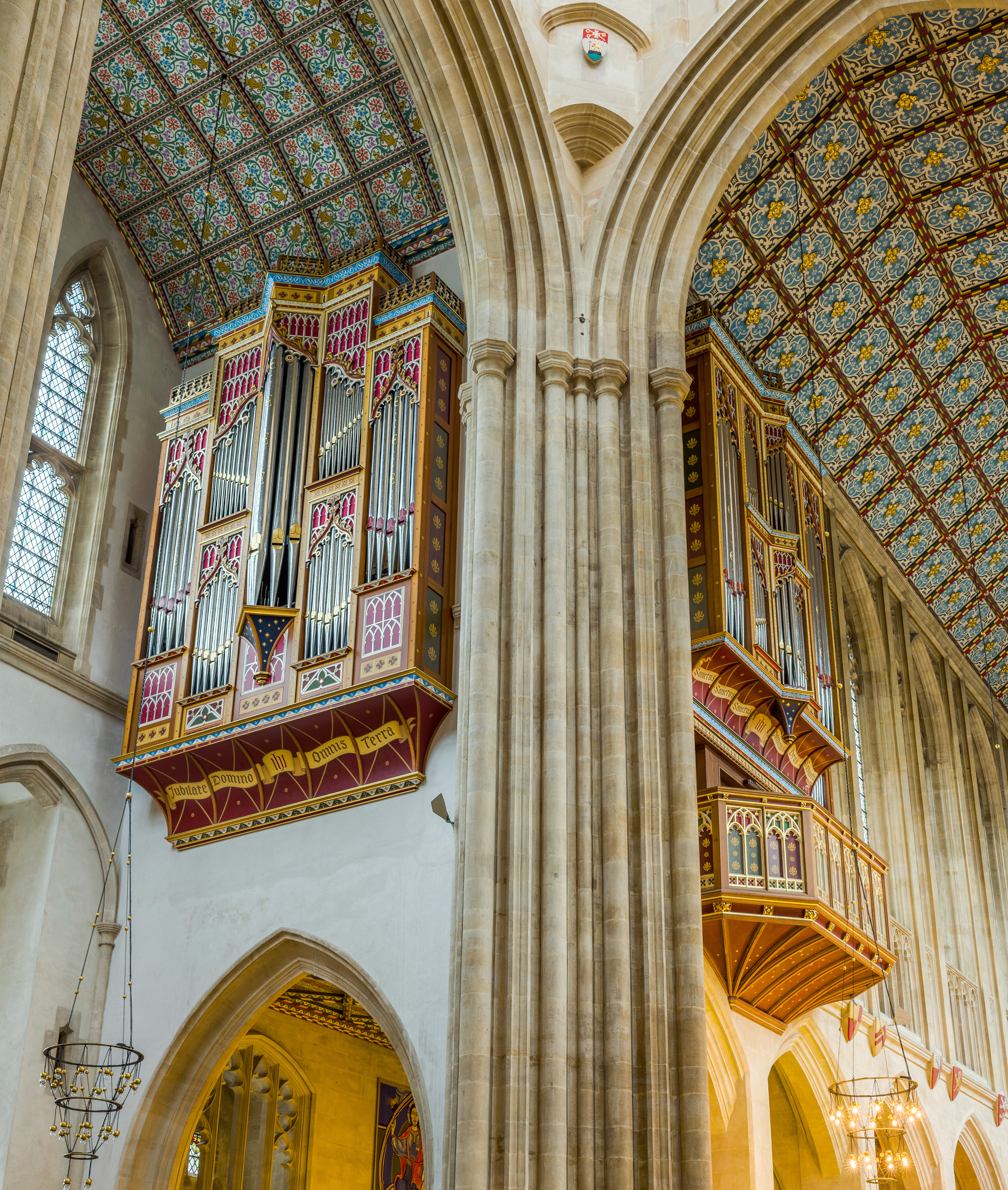
The two organ cases, in the north transept and north choir

The Organ was rebuilt by Harrison and Harrison in 2010; Details of the organ from the National Pipe Organ Register

=== Directors of Music ===
- 1896 Charles John Harold Shane
- 1937 Edwin Percy Hallam
- 1958 Harrison Oxley
- 1985 Paul Trepte
- 1990 Mark Blatchly
- 1993 Mervyn Cousins
- 1997 James Thomas
- 2020 Richard Cook (acting)
- 2020 Timothy Parsons
- 2024 Claudia Grinnell

== Bells ==
A ring of 12 bells are located in the adjacent Norman Tower. The original ten bells were cast in 1785 by Thomas Osborn of Downham Market. In 1973 the bells were rehung in an iron frame at a lower level in the tower. Following a public appeal, a further two bells were added at Easter 2012. A thirteenth bell was added in 2013 which allows beginners to practice with a full octave, without having to use the three heaviest bells. The bells are rung on Sundays before the morning and evening services, and also for weddings and other special occasions.

== Ancient Library ==
The Ancient Library is located in a room over the north-west porch. It was founded by Miles Mosse (1558–1615), who was preacher at St James’ Church, Bury St Edmunds.

== Gallery ==
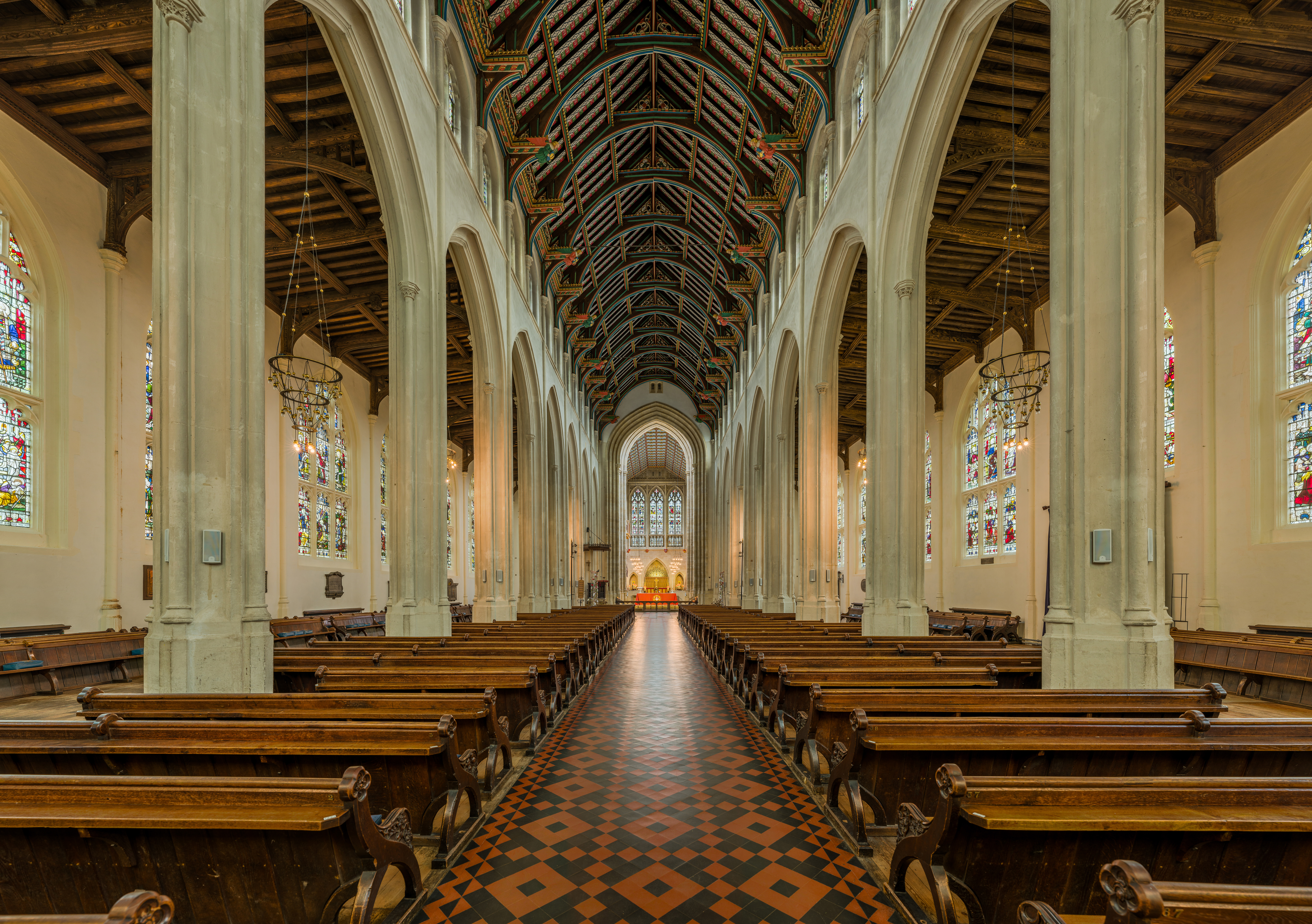
The nave of Bury St Edmunds Cathedral, facing East

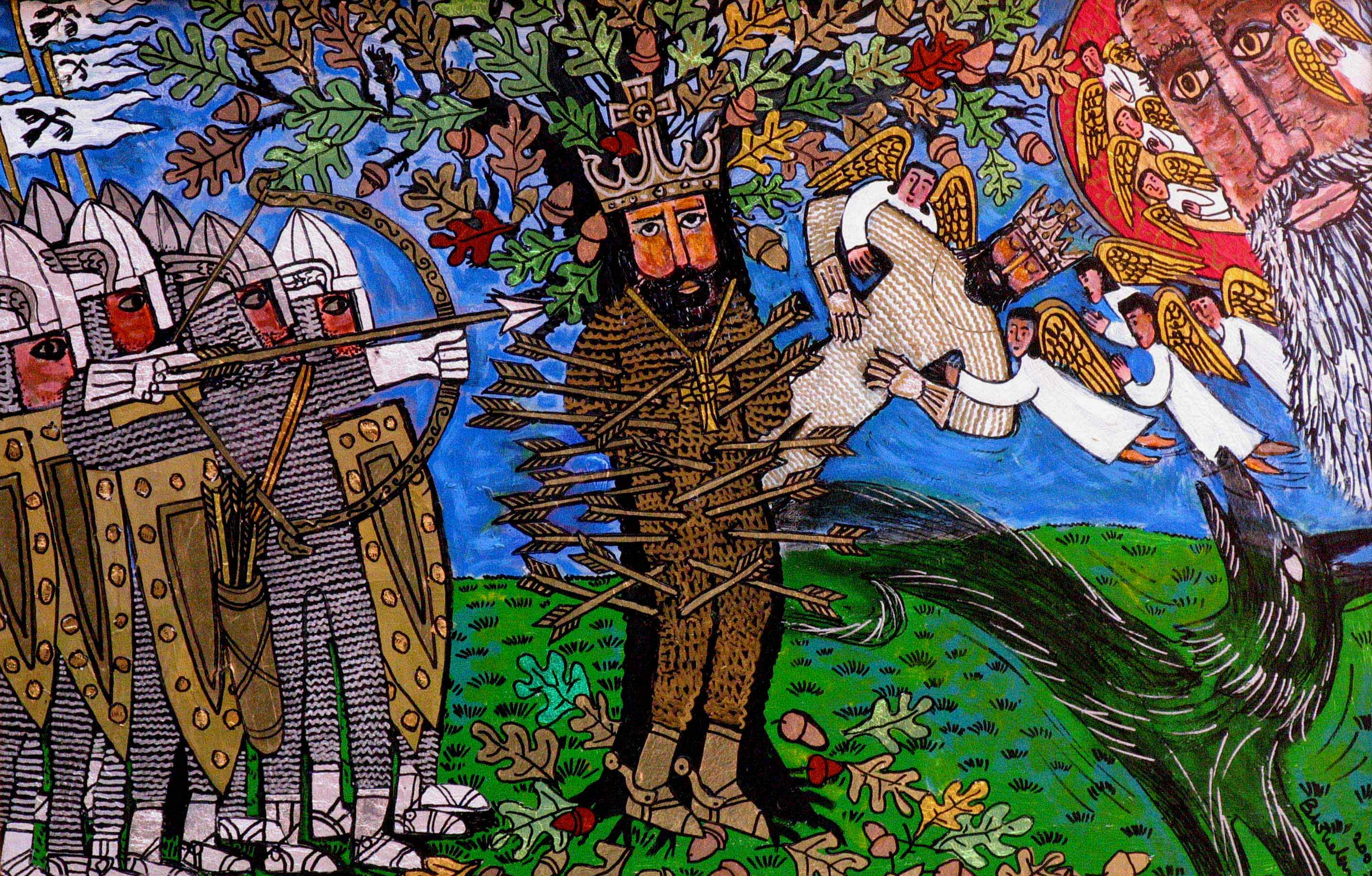
The Martyrdom of St Edmund by Brian Whelan

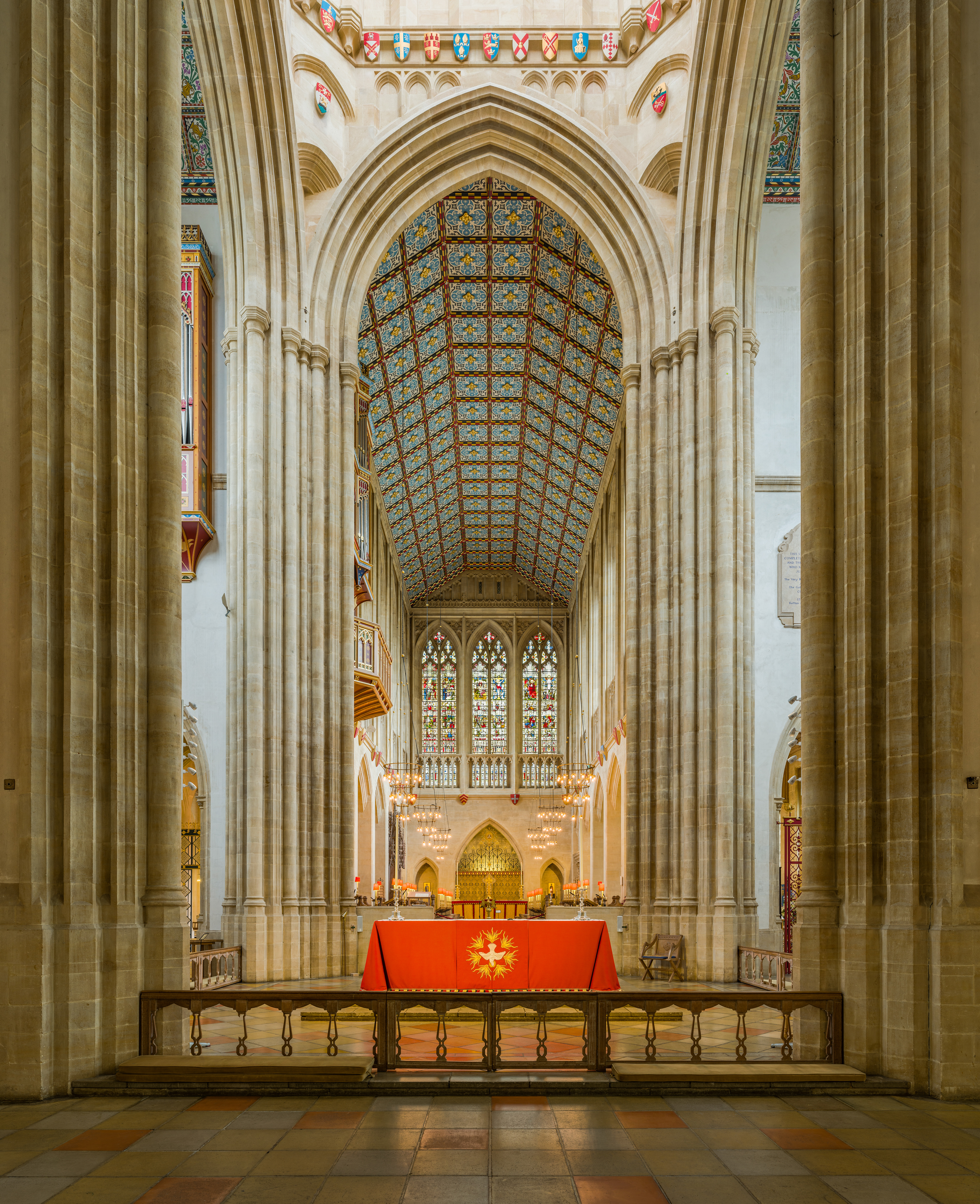
The view from the nave to the sanctuary

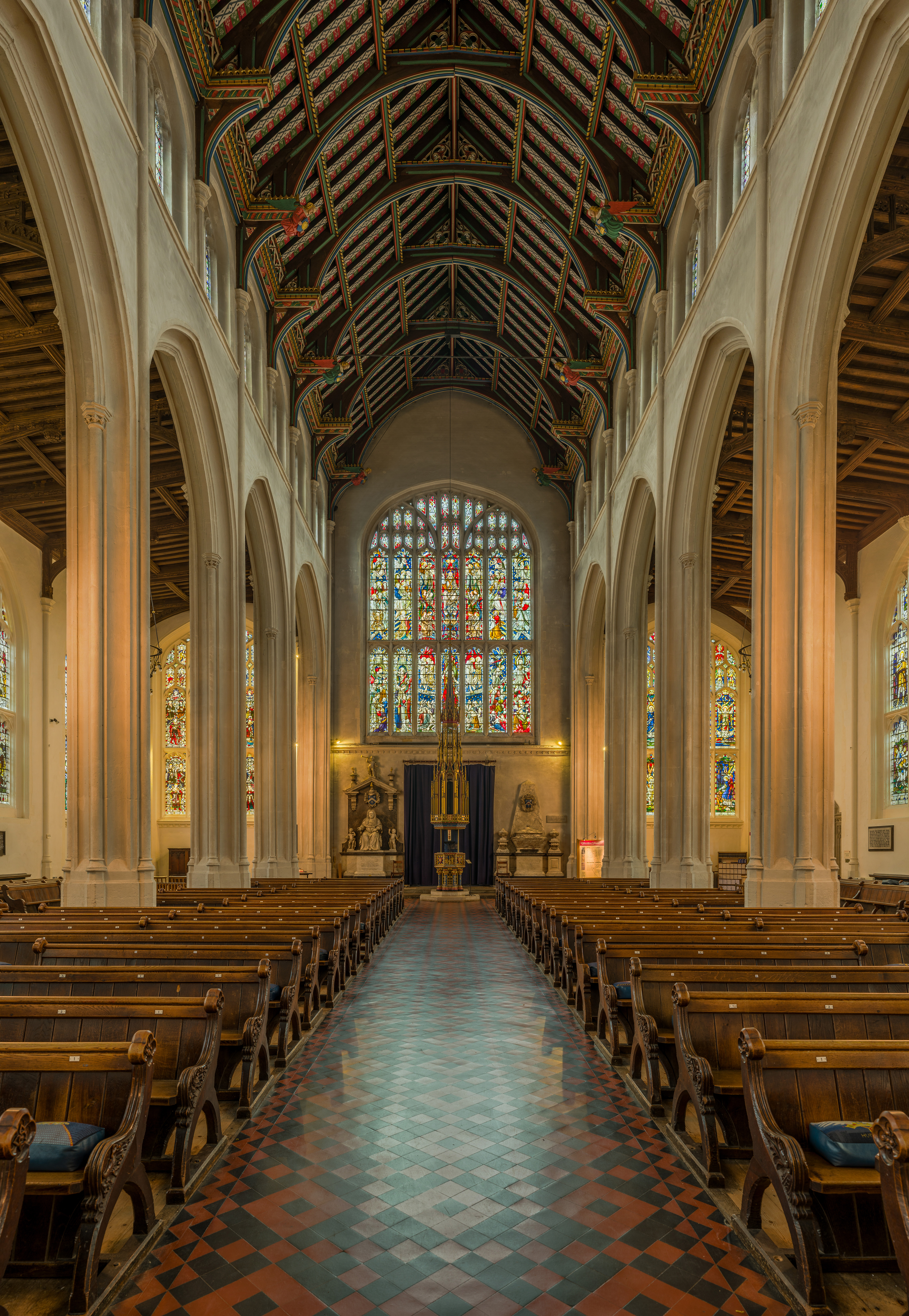
Looking west towards the entrance of the nave

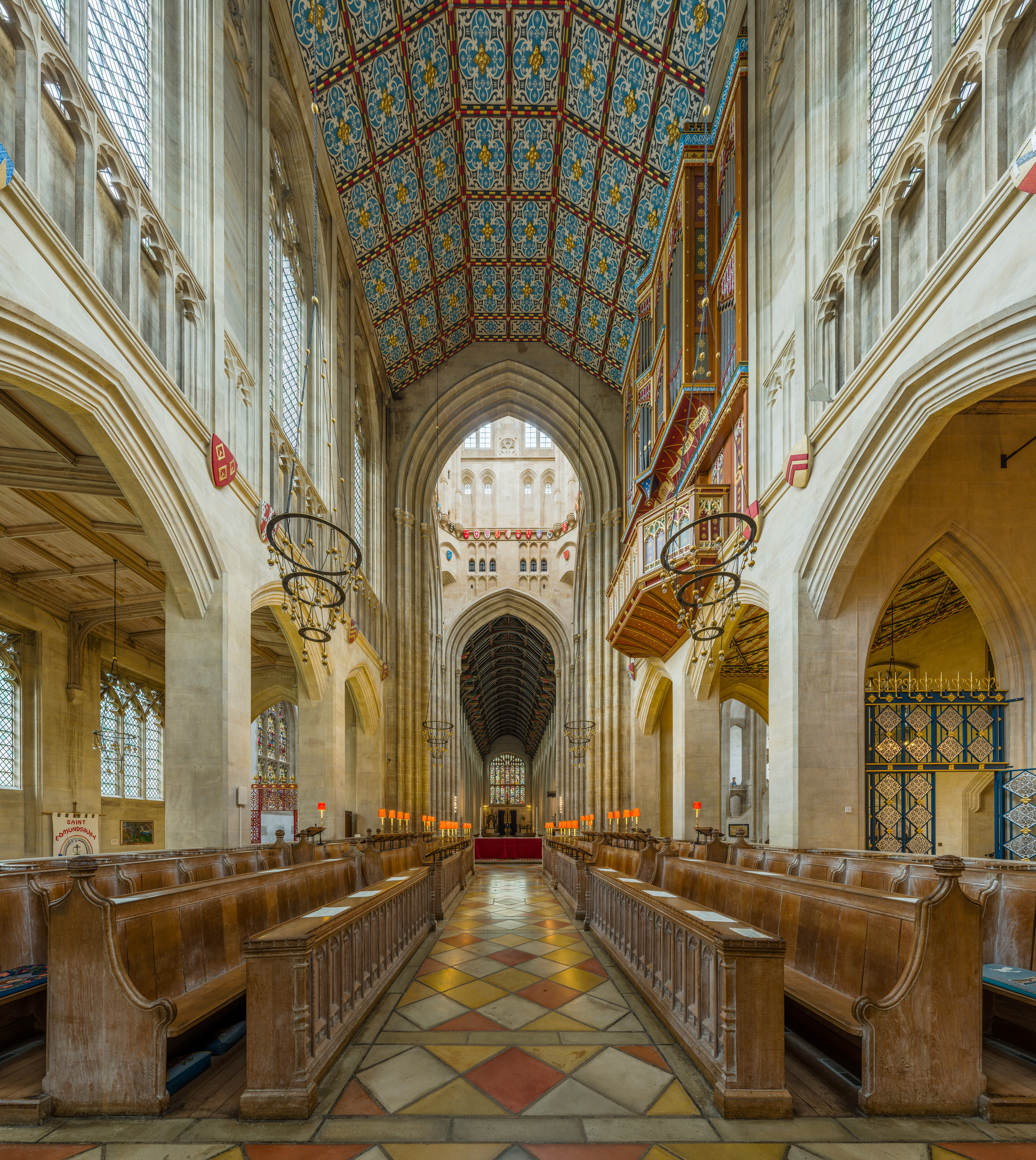
The choir looking towards the nave

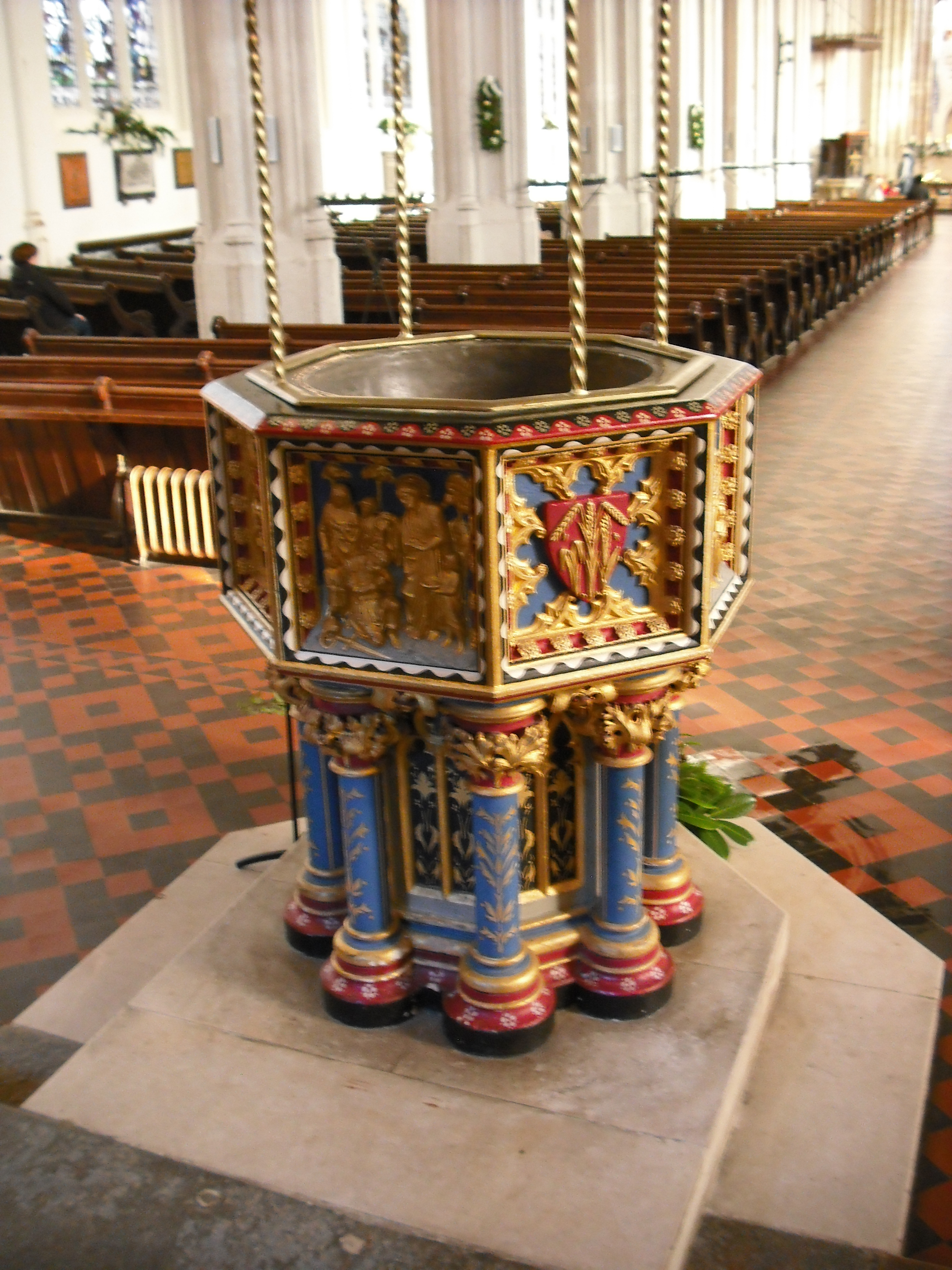
Baptismal font

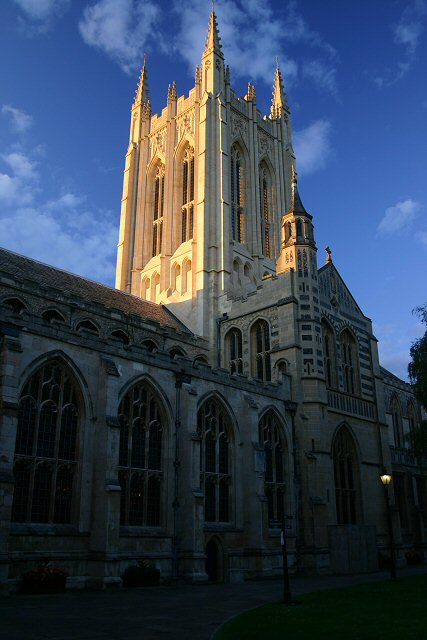
The Millennium Tower, completed in 2005

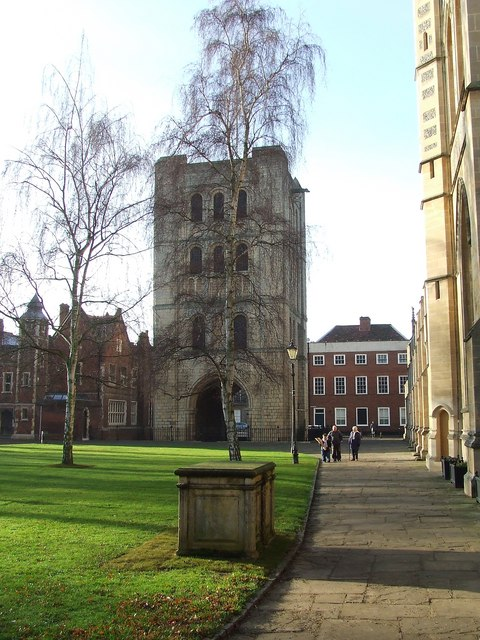
The adjacent 12th-century Norman Tower, which houses the cathedral's bells

== See also ==
- List of cathedrals in the United Kingdom
