= Johann Carion =

German astrologer and historical writer

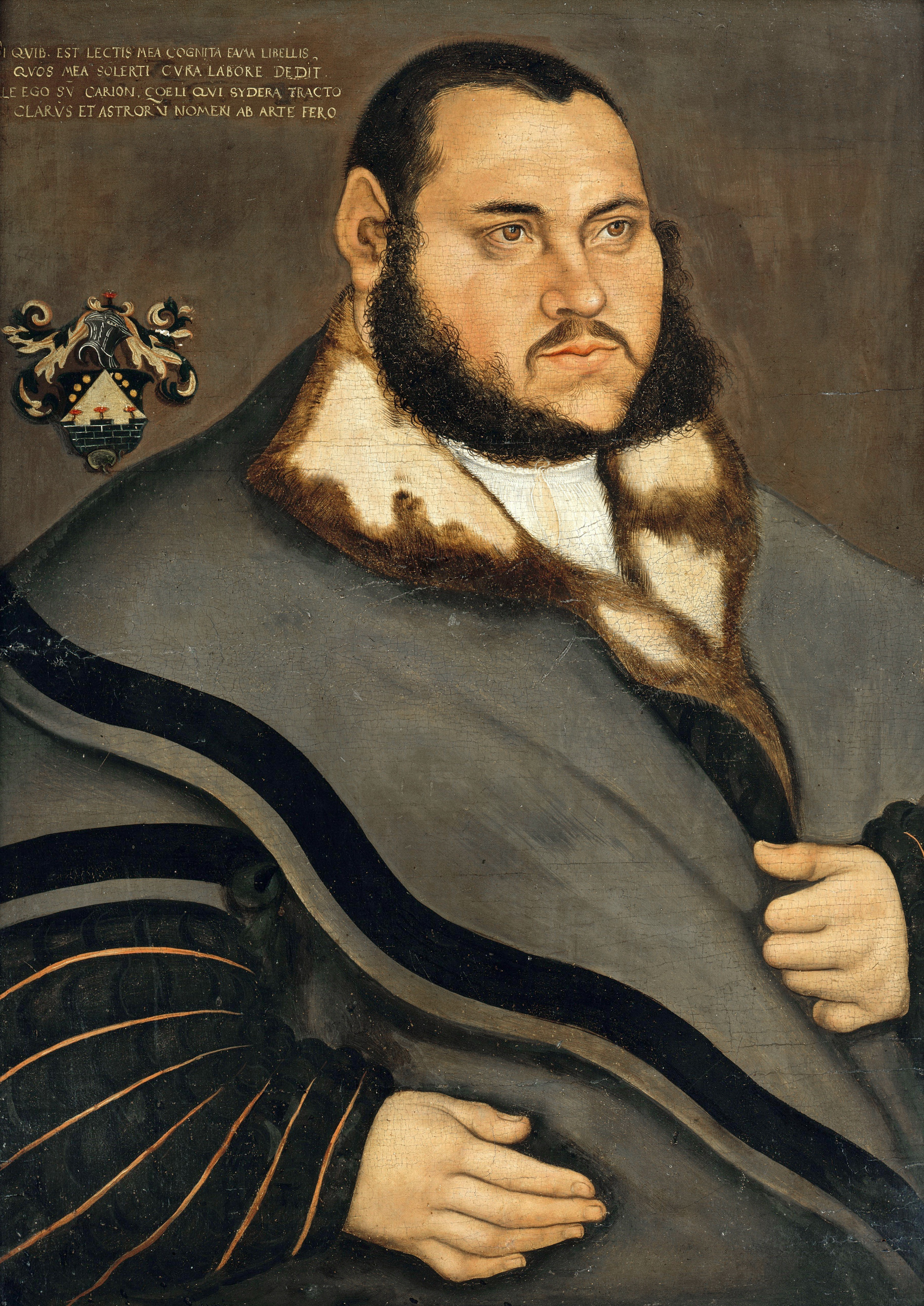
Johann Carion, portrait c. 1530 by Lucas Cranach the Elder.

Johann Carion (22 March 1499, Bietigheim – 2 February 1537) was a German astrologer, known also for historical writings.

== Life ==
He was court astrologer to Elector Joachim I Nestor of Brandenburg. A prognostication he published in 1521 gained him a later reputation of having predicted the Protestant Reformation, as well as a major flood in 1525 and some apocalyptic dates. For 15 July 1524 he predicted another flood so that Joachim I Nestor and his entourage fled to the Runder Berg, then the highest of the Tempelhofer Berge range south of the residential city of Cölln. At about 16:00 h, after spending much of the day on the hill in vain, Electress Elizabeth of Denmark urged her husband to return. They returned to town, where a thunderstorm started and a lightning killed four horses and the coachmen. According to another source the news of their frightful flight had spread among the Cöllners and Berliners, many of whom had tried to get as well onto the hill, but were kept out by electoral guards. On their return the crowd awaited the elector and his entourage and welcoming him laughing.

Subsequently from 1531 Philip Melanchthon took an interest in his work. Andreas Perlach in a work on the comet of 1531 questioned whether his methods were purely astrological or involved magic.

His death is fixed as 1537, when Melanchthon communicated the news in a letter to Jacob Milich.

== Chronicles ==
Carion's Chronicles became an important work in Lutheran and more generally Protestant millenarian thought. From an original that was indeed penned by Carion, it was completely rewritten in its Latin version at the hands of Melanchthon, and others. With Joachim Camerarius, Melanchthon and other Lutheran humanist scholars the work changed from a traditional chronicle into a Reformation narrative of the Middle Ages. After Melanchthon's death, Caspar Peucer continued to edit it. Major features were the scheme of four monarchies taken from the Book of Daniel, extended by the medieval idea of translatio imperii; further there is a second Three Eras schematic, the third period of which will be co-extensive with the Roman Empire extended by the Holy Roman Empire (the fourth monarchy) which will last to 2000 AD. A part of the work today attributed to Melanchthon contained the first evidence for the Lotharian legend. A disproven theory which purported to explain why Roman law (as expounded in the Corpus iuris civilis) was the law of the Holy Roman Empire.

Initially, Carion published a short universal history in German, at Wittenberg (1532). It was then translated into Latin by Herman Bonnus (Halle, 1537); there were numerous subsequent editions and translations.

In England there were translations by Walter Lynne, and also by Thomas Lanquet (unfinished) which was completed by Thomas Cooper (with Robert Crowley) and became known as Cooper's Chronicle.

In 1567, Peter Canisius, the most important Jesuit in Germany, wrote to the Catholic historian Onofrio Panvinio to inquire about the chronicle he was preparing. The work was intended to counter Carion's Chronicles. The Jesuits hoped to use the book in Germany, but despite Canisius's high expectations, Panvinio's work remained only a manuscript. As a result, it was not until the end of the sixteenth century that Orazio Torsellino's Epitome Historiarum (1598) gave the Jesuits a Catholic counterpart to Carion's Chronicles.
