= Robert Steward (dean) =

English cleric

Robert Steward (died 1557) (aliter Styward / Wells) was an English cleric who served as the last prior of the Benedictine Ely Abbey, in Cambridgeshire, and as the first Dean of Ely Cathedral which replaced it at the Dissolution of the Monasteries.

== Origins ==
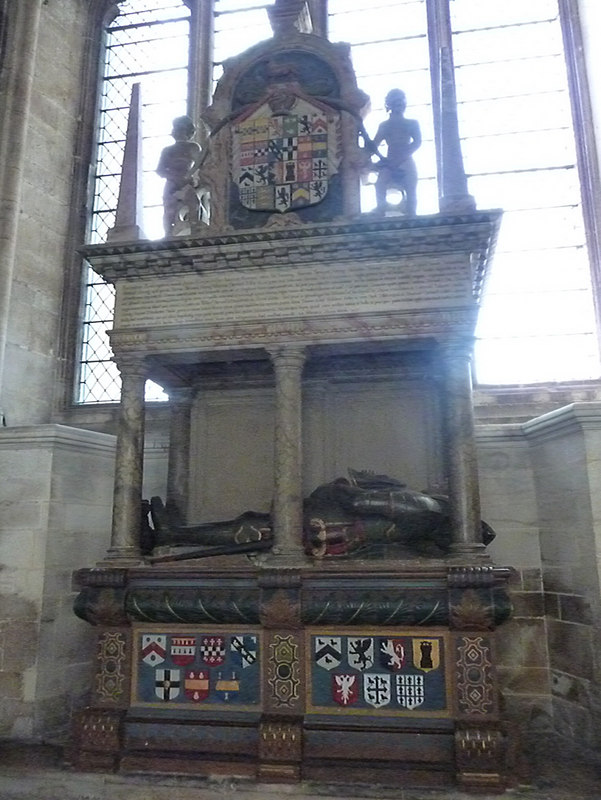
Monument and effigy in Ely Cathedral of Sir Mark Steward (1524-1604), MP, a nephew of Dean Robert Steward. Displays the arms of Stewart, High Stewards of Scotland (Or, a fess chequy argent and azure)

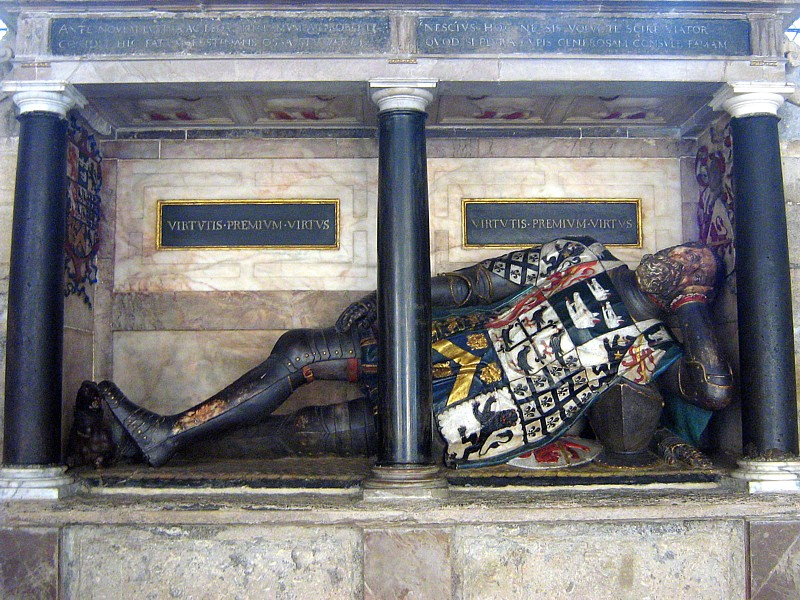
Monument and semi-recumbent effigy in Ely Cathedral of Robert Steward (1526/30-1570), another nephew, of the Dean who displays the "Steward Augmentation" (Argent, a lion rampant gules debruised by a bend raguly or) said to have been awarded to his ancestor Sir Alexander Steward "The Fierce" (a grandson of Alexander Stewart, 4th High Steward of Scotland (died 1283)) by the French King Charles VI (1368-1422)

He was born at Wells in Norfolk, a son of Nicholas Steward of Wells by his heiress wife Cecilia Baskerville. His brothers included Simeon Steward (d.1568) who married Joan Besteney, daughter and heiress of Edward Besteney of Soham in Cambridgeshire, whose sons included Sir Mark Steward (d.1603), MP, whose grand monument with effigy survives in Ely Cathedral, and Nicholas Steward (1547-1633) of Taplow in Buckinghamshire, later of Hartley Mauditt in Hampshire, grandfather of Sir Nicholas Steward, 1st Baronet (1618-1710) "Baronet of Hartley Mauditt", of Pylewell Park in Hampshire, whose descendants adopted the surname "Stuart". The History of Parliament biography of one of his relatives states that Robert "fabricated a descent from Sir Alexander Stuart, a ferocious offshoot of the Scottish Royal House" (i.e. Alexander Styward/Stewart "The Fierce"). "However, it has been suggested that his real ancestry involved a promotion from the keeping of pigs to the holding of manorial courts" (i.e. the chief function of a steward of a lord of a manor during the feudal era). "A minor gentry family in late medieval Norfolk, their fortune, as well as their pedigree, was made by the time-serving prior, who assigned generous tracts of dean and chapter lands within the Isle of Ely to numerous relatives". The surname "Styward" is thus interpreted in some sources as signifying "keeper/warder of the pig sties" and not a corruption of "Stewart". This "fabricated pedigree" is set out in the Heraldic Visitation of Cambridgeshire, 1575 and shows him 8th in descent from the third son of Alexander Stewart, 4th High Steward of Scotland (died 1283), from whose first son were descended all the Stuart kings of Scotland. Thus he was, according to the pedigree, the 8th cousin of King James V of Scotland (1513-1542), grandfather of King James I of England. His branch of the Stewart family had been settled in England for seven generations, since John Styward (a son of Alexander Styward/Stewart "The Fierce") had married a member of the Tollemache family of Suffolk. However the pedigree was declared bogus by "that redoubtable genealogist" Dr Horace Round, who "had great pleasure in refuting ... (and) proved beyond that these Stewards were originally pig keepers in Norfolk hence (Sty ward), probably of illegitimate descent and nothing to do with the King's family". Some of his later relatives used the coat of arms of Stewart, Hereditary High Steward of Scotland,(Or, a fess chequy argent and azure), from whom the Stuart monarchs of Scotland are descended, for example William Stewart of "Wisbech, in the Isle of Ely", Cambridgeshire, whose daughter married Sir William Cook, 2nd Baronet (c.1630-1708). The Steward family branch of the Dean of Ely also used the augmentation of honour Argent, a lion rampant gules debruised by a bend raguly or awarded by the French King Charles VI (1368-1422) to Sir Alexander Steward "The Fierce" (a grandson of Alexander Stewart, 4th High Steward of Scotland (died 1283) as is visible on the tabard of the effigy of Robert Steward (d.1570), cousin of the Dean, in Ely Cathedral.

Oliver Cromwell was a relative as his mother was Elizabeth Steward "a daughter of William Steward, of a comfortably-off Norfolk family who farmed Ely's abbey and cathedral lands. The idea that the Stewards were connected with the royal Stuarts and descended from a Scottish prince shipwrecked on the Norfolk coast in 1406 is a non-starter. The Lord Protector himself never took it seriously, though he did once joke that his mother was a Stuart at a drinking party in Edinburgh in 1651".

== Career ==
Robert became a monk at Ely Abbey, when he adopted as his surname "Wells", the place of his birth. He graduated B.A. at Cambridge University in 1516 and M.A. in 1520. About 1522 he was elected Prior of Ely Abbey, and in that capacity took the chief part in the election of Thomas Goodrich as Bishop of Ely in 1534. In the convocation of 1529 he maintained the validity of Henry VIII's marriage with Catherine of Aragon; but he found reason to change his views, and became one of Henry's instruments in persuading monasteries to surrender to the king. In 1536 he was nominated a candidate for the suffragan-bishopric of Colchester, but the king appointed William More. On 18 November 1539 during the Dissolution of the Monasteries, he surrendered the Ely Abbey to commissioners of King Henry VIII, in exchange for which he received a generous pension; and on 10 September 1541, when the See of Ely was re-founded by royal charter, he was appointed the first Dean of Ely Cathedral, as the former abbey church became, and the majority of the former monks were re-employed in lucrative roles as prebendaries and minor canons, supplemented by Matthew Parker, later Archbishop of Canterbury, and Richard Cox, later Bishop of Ely. He then resumed his family name of Steward. He complied with the religious changes under both the staunchly Protestant King Edward VI and the Roman Catholic Queen Mary, retaining his deanery until his death on 22 September 1557. He was buried in Ely Cathedral, and his memorial inscription is recorded in James Bentham's Ely and Charles Henry Cooper's Athenae Cantabrigienses.

== Works ==
Steward continued the Historia Eliensis (History of Ely) from 1486 to 1554. The manuscript was preserved at Lambeth Palace, and was printed in Henry Wharton's Anglia Sacra.

== Family ==
Among the Dean's brothers were Simeon Steward, grandfather of Sir Simeon Steward, MP; Thomas Steward (d. 1568), who was pastor of the English church at Frankfurt during Mary's reign, and canon of Ely from 1560 till his death; Edmund Steward (d. 1559), who was Chancellor of the Diocese of Norwich until 1529, and afterwards Chancellor of Winchester under Bishop Stephen Gardiner from 1531 until 1553. Edmund was appointed Dean of Winchester in 1554; and Nicholas Steward or Styward (fl. 1560), who was recommended by Andrew Perne as his successor in the chancellorship of Norwich.
