= Robert Crowley (printer) =

English stationer, poet, writer, and clergyman

The Venerable Robert Crowley
- Archdeacon of Hereford
- Church: Church of England
- Diocese: Hereford
- Installed: 24 March 1559
- Term ended: 1567
- Predecessor: John Glazier
- Successor: Edward Cowper

Orders
- Ordination: 28/29 September 1551 by Nicholas Ridley

Personal details
- Born: c. 1517 Gloucestershire, England
- Died: 18 June 1588 (aged c. 71)
- Denomination: Protestantism (Anglicanism)
- Education: Magdalen College, Oxford

Robert Crowley (Robertus Croleus, Roberto Croleo, Robart Crowleye, Robarte Crole or Crule, c. 1517 – 18 June 1588), was a stationer, poet, polemicist and Protestant clergyman among Marian exiles at Frankfurt. He seems to have been a Henrician Evangelical in favour of a more reformed Protestantism than the king and the Church of England sanctioned.

Under Edward VI, he joined a London network of evangelical stationers to argue for reforms, sharing a vision of his contemporaries Hugh Latimer, Thomas Lever, Thomas Beccon and others of England as a reformed Christian commonwealth. He attacked as inhibiting reform what he saw as corruption and uncharitable self-interest among the clergy and wealthy. Meanwhile, Crowley took part in making the first printed editions of Piers Plowman, the first translation of the Gospels into Welsh, and the first complete metrical psalter in English, which was also the first to include harmonised music. Towards the end of Edward's reign and later, Crowley criticised the Edwardian Reformation as compromised and saw the dissolution of the monasteries as replacing one form of corruption by another.

On his return to England after the reign of Mary I, Crowley revised his chronicle to represent the Edwardian Reformation as a failure, due to figures like Thomas Seymour, 1st Baron Seymour of Sudeley, Edward Seymour, 1st Duke of Somerset and John Dudley, 1st Duke of Northumberland. Crowley's account of the Marian martyrs represented them as a cost mostly paid by commoners. The work became a source for John Foxe's account of the period in his Actes and Monuments. Crowley held church positions in the early to mid-1560s and sought change from the pulpit and within the church hierarchy.

Against the Elizabethan Religious Settlement, Crowley was a leader in the renewed vestments controversy, which eventually lost him his clerical posts. During the dispute he and other London clergy produced a "first Puritan manifesto". Late in life Crowley was restored to several church posts and appears to have charted a more moderate course in defending it from Roman Catholicism and from nonconformist factions that espoused a Presbyterian church polity.

== Early life ==
Crowley was born in about 1517 in Gloucestershire, possibly in Tetbury, although John Bale says that he was a native of Northamptonshire, and A. B. Emden's A Biographical Register of the University of Oxford says that Crowley was twenty on 25 July 1539. Crowley himself wrote in 1578 that he was then sixty-one years old.

Crowley began his studies at the University of Oxford in about 1534, and was listed as a demy (Note: "Demy" was the term used at Magdalen for what was elsewhere called a scholar; it was a sort of research position occupied by those waiting for fellowships to become vacant.) of Magdalen College on 25 July 1539. He experienced an evangelical conversion about this time which entailed religious convictions more in line with continental Protestant reformers, but quite at odds with the Church of England under Henry VIII and the Act of Six Articles, known to those who chafed under it as "the whip with six strings". Magdalen was then "a hotbed of evangelicals," according to Brett Usher. Four of its members during this period became bishops under Elizabeth I, and with Crowley, Lawrence Humphrey was a key leader in the vestments controversy that took place during her reign. Most of the Magdalen evangelicals became exiles under Mary I, and their influence was purged from the college by Stephen Gardiner in 1554.

Crowley received his B.A. on 19 June 1540, and became Probationer Fellow on 26 July 1541 or 1542. In 1542 he became a Fellow of Magdalen College, but he left the same year. Crowley's departure may have been due to a purge of evangelicals, or because, like John Foxe, he objected to the necessity of taking holy orders which entailed a vow of celibacy. It is known that Foxe, like many evangelicals, did not accept the rationale for mandatory clerical celibacy, and evidently Crowley did not either, as he married some years later. At this time Foxe also left the college, naming Crowley and the future bishop Thomas Cooper in a letter to Magdalen's president, Owen Oglethorpe, as being among his circle. Foxe described this group of his fellows as being persecuted by other members of the college, although – unlike Foxe and Crowley – Cooper did not leave the university, and while Oglethorpe himself was no evangelical, years later in Crowley's psalter's dedication letter to him, Crowley holds his former teacher in high regard.

From 1542 to about 1546 Crowley tutored for the Protestant household of Sir Nicholas Poyntz (1510–1556/7) in Iron Acton, Gloucestershire, his own home county. (Poyntz's aunt on his father's side, Lady Anne Walsh and wife of Sir John Walsh of Little Sodbury, had taken in William Tyndale as a tutor for their sons from 1521 to 1522/1523.) At the same time as Crowley, Foxe found a similar arrangement, following a pattern whereby promising, young, university-educated men who sought greater changes in the church were supported by members of the lesser nobility until political circumstances were more favourable for public and institutional engagement.

== London publishing career under Edward VI ==
Political circumstances changed greatly with the death of the king. Reformist hopes for the church were high under the boy king, Edward VI, whose uncle, Edward Seymour, 1st Duke of Somerset, held the real reins of power as Lord Protector during Edward's minority. Both were sympathetic to the reformist cause.

Perhaps anticipating the death of Henry VIII, Crowley had moved to London by the end of 1546, and according to William Herbert's Typographical Antiquities he was possibly working as a proof-reader for an evangelical printer, John Day, and perhaps later William Seres as well. Seres and Day became partners in late 1547, and remained together until 1550. In 1547 they were working in Holborn Conduit in St Sepulchre's parish at the sign of the Resurrection, but as William Cecil's servant, Seres was able to acquire Peter College for his printing operation. This was a former chantry at St Paul's Cathedral, part of which became Stationers' Hall in 1554. Between 1549, when he became a member of the Stationers' Company, and 1551, when he was ordained, Crowley wrote eleven or twelve books, and edited, translated, or acted as printer or publisher of seven others (see below, Crowley's status as a printer).

Crowley may have been involved in the preparation and publication of several books between 1546 and 1548; he certainly participated in the production of some of them. There were two editions of A Supplication of the Poor Commons c. 1546, which may have been written by Henry Brinkelow alone or possibly in association with Crowley. One of these editions included a reprint of Simon Fish's A Supplication of Beggars (c. 1529), which famously attacked the doctrine of purgatory as a politically and economically disabling deception inflicted on the English people. Both "supplications" presented socioeconomic and religious reform as two integral aspects of a single response to the major problems of the day. The other early imprint with some connection to Crowley was a treatise on the true, biblical meaning of the Lord's supper, with a rebuttal of Thomas More's arguments in favour of the Catholic doctrines on that subject. This tract was printed in three editions, and is attributed to William Tyndale (it is also sometimes attributed to George Joye). It includes an introductory epistle, "To all the studious readers", that is signed by Crowley.

The first books that are unambiguously Crowley's issued from Day and Seres' press in 1548, when Seres became a freeman of the Stationers' Company. These were a refutation of Nicholas Shaxton's sermon at Anne Askew's burning in 1546, in which Shaxton recanted his evangelical beliefs, a refutation of Miles Huggarde's arguments for transubstantiation in a lost ballad called The Abuse of ye blessed sacrament of the aultare, and An information and peticion, which must have been written before December 1547, since it refers to the Act of Six Articles as being unrepeated. Crowley's response to Hogarde contains the only source for Huggarde's original poem, since Crowley quotes it in full in order to refute it passage by passage. An informacion and peticion addresses parliament on behalf of economically distressed commoners, and follows an established tradition of social complaint regarding the abuses of wealthy landlords, such as rack-renting, engrossing (the consolidation of several smaller strips into one hedged farm, separated from the rest of the common land), and enclosure. Appearing in two English editions and two Latin editions translated from the English by J. Heron and possibly published by Stephen Mierdman, the full title is An informacion and peticion agaynst the oppressours of the pore commons of this real me, compiled and imprinted for this only purpose that amongst them that haue to doe in the Parliamente, some godlye mynded men, may hereat take occasion to speak more in the matter then the authoure was able to write. If the wealthy fail to reform themselves, Crowley warns that divine retribution will follow, and he looks to the crown to make things right. This is the pattern of a number of Crowley's subsequent Edwardian publications, and for that reason he has been associated with other social critics of the day, such as Thomas Lever, Thomas Beccon, and Hugh Latimer. Some influential 20th-century historians have referred to these men as constituting a "commonwealth party", but G.R. Elton succeeded in sweeping away this romantic designation. The existence of a "commonwealth party" is now widely rejected, and its supposed members are unlikely to be described in terms of a collective movement.

In 1549 Richard Grafton and Mierdman published Crowley's The Psalter of Dauid newly translated into English metre in such sort that it maye the more decently, and with more delete of the mynde, be reade and songe of all men. Wherunto is added a note of four parties.... There is an introduction in English, and a dedicatory epistle to Owen Oglethorpe, president of Magdalen College, Oxford at that time and when Crowley had been a student and fellow there. (Crowley's psalter is discussed in greater detail under the entry for metrical psalters.)

Crowley's next publications included a large number of polemical social works, often poems, some of which appeared in several editions:

- A new years gyfte, wherein is taught the knowledge of our self and the fear of God. Worthy to be geuen and thankfully receyued of al Christen men (1549)
- The voyce of the laste trumpet blowen bi the seue[n]th angel (as is me[n]tioned in the eleuenth of the Apocalips) callynge al the estates of menne to the right path of their vocation, wherin are contayned xii. lessons to twelue seueral estates of menne, whych if they learne and folowe, al shal be well and nothynge amise (1549)
- One and thyrtye epigrammes, wherein are bryefly touched so many abuses, that maye and ought to be put away (1550)
- The way to wealth, wherein is plainly taught a most present remedy for sedicion (1550)
- A myroure or glasse for all spiritual ministers to beholde them selues in, wherein they may learne theyr office and duitie towardis the flocke committed to their charg gathered out of Holy Scripture and Catholyke doctours, by Peter Pykeryng seruant to the Ryght Worshipful Syr Anthonie Neueil Knyght, and one of the Kingis Maiesties councel established in the northe, and sent to Syr Avon Todkyll vycar of South Leuerton, and other his co[m]plsis in Notyngham thyre for a newe yeres gyfte (1550)

There are also two books of uncertain authorship published during this period which may have been Crowley's work:

- Pyers plowmans exhortation, vnto the lordes, knightes and burgoysses of the Parlyamenthouse. Imprinted at London: By Anthony Scoloker dwelling in the Sauoy tentes. without Templebarre (1550?)
- Vita fatrum mendicantium (c. 1550)

Authorship of Pyers plowmans exhortation is speculatively attributed to Crowley by Barbara Johnson in Reading Piers Plowman and The Pilgrim's Progress: Reception and the Protestant Reader (Southern Illinois University Press, 1992). Vita fratrum medicantium is a lost medieval text that was printed around 1550, perhaps with Crowley's involvement. In his catalogue John Bale names Peter Pateshull as its author and R. Kylington as the translator. Pateshull was an Augustinian divine at Oxford c.1387, whom Wycliffe had persuaded to preach against the Augustinian friars. His text is a commentary on Hildegard of Bingen's prophecy against friars, which was enshrined as proto-Protestant lore in Foxe's Actes and Monuments.

Next came Crowley's three editions of Piers Plowman in 1550, as well as an edition of the prologue to John Wycliffe's translation of the Bible, which was written by John Purvey and wrongly attributed to Wycliff by Crowley on John Bale's authority. A 1540 recension of this text had been printed as: The dore of holy scripture. Crowley's version contains a signed note "To the reader". A running head reads: "The pathwaye to perfect knowledg", and Crowley's title page for the book reads: "The true copye of a prolog wrytten about two C. yeres paste by Iohn Wycklife (as maye iustly be gatherid bi that, that Iohn Bale hath writte[n] of him in his boke entitlid the Summarie of famous writers of the Ile of great Brita[n]) the originall whereof is founde written in an olde English Bible bitwixt the olde Testament and the Newe. Whych Bible remaynith now in ye Kyng hys maiesties chamber". Also in 1550 Crowley printed three books by the Welsh scholar William Salesbury (or Salisbury) concerning the Welsh language, some anti-Roman Catholic polemics, and an ancient Welsh precedent for clerical marriage. In 1551 Crowley published a fourth Salesbury text, a Welsh translation of the epistle and gospel readings from the 1549 Book of Common Prayer.

In 1551 Crowley printed a poetic work "for John Case dwelling in Peter Coledge rentes"; its title is: The knoledge of good and iuyle, other wyse calyd Ecclesiastes, ryght excelente and worthy, of all men to be had in mynde now a newe set fourth in meter. by pore Shakerlaye. Two original long poems by Crowley were also printed by him that year: Philargyrie of Greate Britayne (a political-religious allegory) and Pleasure and payne, heauen and hell: Remembre these foure, and all shall be well.

=== Crowley's status as a printer ===
There is some scholarly disagreement about whether or not Crowley actually operated or managed a press that he owned or leased. On the one hand, Olga Illston's "A Literary and Bibliographical Study of Robert Crowley" (M.A. Thesis, London University, 1953) is the basis for the Revised Short Title Catalogue (STC or RSTC) and current ESTC identification of Richard Grafton, the King's printer, as the printer of many of Crowley's books under Edward VI. Illston demonstrates that the initial blocks used in Crowley's books between 1549 and 1551 belonged to Grafton, and she notes the frequent use of the same type in Grafton and Crowley imprints. This led to the STC revisers and other scholars, most notably John N. King, to conclude that Crowley never had his own press, but was only a bookseller. The revised STC generally follows Illston, although Illston attributed the printing of Crowley's Psalter to Richard Jugge with assistance from Grafton; the revised STC, King, and other sources identify Stephen Mierdman as its printer.

Prior to Crowley's arrival in London, Grafton had been imprisoned three times for printing-related offences: twice in 1541 (for a "sedicious [sic] epistle of Melanctons" and ballads defending Thomas Cromwell), and then in 1543, for the Great Bible. The possibility arises, therefore, that Grafton used Crowley's imprint "as a conduit for radical publication, but at a safe remove", as R. Carter Hailey suggests in "Giving Light to the Reader: Robert Crowley's Editions of Piers Plowman (1550)" (PhD thesis, University of Virginia, 2001): 15 and "'Geuyng light to the reader': Robert Crowley's Editions of Piers Plowman (1550)", Publications of the Bibliographical Society of America 95.4 (2001): 483–502. This semi-surreptitious printing was an attempt, in King's estimation, by Protector Somerset and his supporters "to shape public opinion in secret" (English Reformation Literature, 96–7; repeated in King's "The Book-trade under Edward VI and Mary I", in Lotte Hellinga and J. B. Trapp, eds., vol. 3, 1400–1557, The Cambridge History of the Book in Britain [Cambridge: Cambridge University Press, 1999]: 167–8). However, this argument for a connection to Somerset depends on tenuous links drawn between the Protector and Crowley via Grafton and/or Lady Elizabeth Fane. (See below, Crowley's patrons.)

On the other hand, Peter W. M. Blayney contends that the revised STC erroneously indicates that Grafton printed Crowley's works. Blayney believes that the revisers realised that the ornamental "A" in Crowley's The baterie of the Popes Botereulx (1550): A6r (STC 21613) "had once belonged to Grafton", but they did not know that "the person from whom Crowley borrowed it was almost certainly not Grafton but John Day, who apparently acquired it from Grafton in 1548 (STC 23004) and never returned it (2087.5, 6849.5, 7633.3, etc.)". Additionally, Blayney suggests that the STC revisers were misled by another fact:

"In and after 1560, Grafton's son-in-law Richard Tottel used quite a lot of Grafton's old ornament stock. It has long been the received opinion that when Mary Tudor deprived Grafton of his royal office, he immediately sold off his printing house and equipment to Robert Caly – except, of course, for the various bits and pieces that Tottell allegedly used to set up shop in that same year. In fact, that is not what happened at all. What Grafton did with his printing house was to sublet it to Caly – and when Elizabeth I acceded in late 1558 he took it back and attempted to re-start his own career (STC 16291 of 1559 was really printed by Grafton, as the titlepage claims). By the end of 1559 he had realised that it wasn't going to work – and it was not until then that Grafton stopped paying the rent for his printing house and Tottell acquired his supply of ex-Grafton initials."

(Peter W. M. Blayney, letter to R. Carter Hailey, 5 January 2001).

The appearance of Grafton's blocks in Crowley's books is, on this view, insufficient evidence from which to conclude that Crowley did not print them himself or, moreover, that he never had a printing house at all. Blayney believes that Crowley did have a press and printed the works that bear his name from 1550 to 1551, except for a few titles printed entirely or in part by Day and/or Mierdman:

"The three 'Crowley' books of 1549 seemingly were printed for him by others: STC 2725 by Stephen Mierdman (only); 6087 and 6094 by John Day. Also by Day is 6096 (dated 1550), while the double-dated 6095 was either printed partly by Day or partly by Crowley himself or (more likely) by Crowley alone but with a few ornamental initials borrowed from Day. All the other Crowley books of 1550–51 that I've seen are the work of Crowley alone—as I assume are the only two I haven't seen, namely 2761.5 and 19897.3. Crowley also printed STC 25852 for Robert Stoughton, but without putting his name on it."

(Peter W. M. Blayney, letter to R. Carter Hailey, 5 January 2001)

Blayney's revised attributions are discussed and listed in Hailey's dissertation; they were later elaborated in Blayney's book, The Stationers' Company and the Printers of London, 1501-1557.

=== Crowley's patrons ===
As discussed in the previous section, Crowley has been linked with Grafton, the King's Printer under Edward VI, and some speculate that through Grafton Crowley had some measure of support from Somerset and other reform-minded political elites. However, it is far from certain that Crowley had Somerset or other highly placed patrons supporting his various projects, and it is in any case tenuous to assume that the existence of direct or indirect support implies a unity of thought and purpose rather than a contingent, pragmatic alliance.

This is especially true in the case of Somerset, who fell from power just before Crowley's most prolific publishing period. Crowley cast Somerset in a less than positive light in alterations and continuations that he made in his 1559 revised and updated version of Thomas Lanquet and Thomas Cooper's chronicle. Crowley's Philargyrie may also offer veiled criticism of some of Somerset's perceived military and political failings from 1547-1550. Philargyrie and other of Crowley's Edwardian works take the dim view of John Bale and other reformers of Protestant elites like Somerset who benefitted financially from the Reformation, particularly the monastic dissolutions. (See the entry for Somerset House.) Bale, for his part, appealed in the dedication of his Summarium for patronage from the king (and indirectly, it would seem, Protector Somerset), but no such support was forthcoming until Somerset had been succeeded by his rival, John Dudley. In general, Crowley's work demonstrates a consistent and progressively emphatic scepticism toward and frustration with the nobility and clerical elites.

The argument in favour of the existence of aristocratic Edwardian patronage for Crowley was first made and is most extensively laid out in an unpublished dissertation by Frederica M. Thomsett where Crowley is connected with Somerset via Lady Elizabeth Fane. John N. King subsequently remarked in several articles, and in his English Reformation Literature (Princeton University Press, 1982) that Crowley had support from Somerset via the patronage of Lady Elizabeth Fane (or Vane), wife of Sir Ralph Fane, one of Somerset's close supporters, who was executed shortly after Somerset in 1552. Following King in identifying Lady Fane as Crowley's patroness are J. W. Martin and, more recently, Graham Parry's contribution to The Cambridge History of Early Modern Literature (Cambridge: Cambridge University Press, 2002).

The evidence for Lady Fane's patronage is Crowley's dedication to her of his Pleasure and Payne, Heaven and Hell... (London, 1551), STC 6090, and Andrew Maunsell's record in The First Part of the Catalogue of English Printed Bookes (London: John Windet for Andrew Maunsell, 1595): 1.85r. Maunsell cites a lost 1550 Crowley imprint of Lady Elizabeth Vane her certain psalms of godly meditation in number 21, With 102 proverbs. (See also Joseph Ames, Typographical Antiquities, 271.) Jennifer Loach, in Edward VI (Yale University Press, 1999): 62, notes that Lady Fane is Crowley's "only possible link, and a tenuous one, with Somerset". Nevertheless, the Oxford Dictionary of National Biography entries on Lady Fane and Crowley have taken the Crowley-Fane-Somerset link as a fact, with the former stating that in the dedication to Pleasure and Payne Crowley called Lady Fane "his 'liberall parones'".

On the contrary, Crowley's dedication appears to be a customary bid for patronage rather than an indication of existing support, and Crowley does not call Fane "his" patroness at all. He writes: "After I had compiled thys little treatise (ryght vertuouse Lady) I thought it my duty to Dedicate the same unto youre Ladishyppes name, as to a ryght worthy Patrones of al such as laboure in the Lords harveste. Not for that I thyncke I have herein done any thyng worthy so liberall a Patrones, but for the worthynes of the matter..."

The rest of the dedication appears to be an oblique admonishment and exhortation to the Somerset circle that is in line with Crowley's other publications at this time and in the late 1540s. Crowley writes in the dedication to Pleasure and Pain that men in positions of power who have "long tyme talked" of the gospel have been more concerned with their own worldly gain and now need to "lyve the gospell". He further implies that failure to act on behalf of the gospel (i.e., the Reformation) and the poor commons, has caused or will soon cause God to "plage" these men and all England just as God punished Israel for its unfaithfulness. These warnings are in line with the rest of the book, which speaks prophetically of judgment to come if the godly commonwealth is not established. Since Pleasure and Pain was printed during the latter stages of Somerset's fall and shortly before his and Sir Ralph Fane's executions, it appears as less a bid for financial support than a plea for a changing of minds and policies. It is notable that Crowley's 1559 continuation of the Lanquet-Cooper chronicle looks back on this period—Somerset's fall, then Dudley's, and the accession of Mary—as precisely a time of judgement that befell England due to the failings principally of the secular leaders such as Somerset.

The only other evidence for a possible connection between Crowley and Somerset is a 1551 publication: The abridgemente of goddes statutes in myter, set oute by Wylliam Samuel seruaunt to the Duke of Somerset hys grace (STC 21690.2). The title page continues: "Imprinted at London: By Robert Crowley for Robert Soughton [i.e., Stoughton]", although the revised STC points to Grafton as the printer. This work is dedicated to Lady Somerset, Anne Seymour.

Other sources suggest a link between Crowley and key aristocratic backers of reformism, such as William Cecil, 1st Baron Burghley and Robert Dudley, 1st Earl of Leicester under Elizabeth. Crowley's associate John Day was long connected with Cecil. Some time between 1561 and 1564 Crowley was listed among twenty-eight "godly preachers which have utterly forsaken Antichrist and all his Romish rags", which was presented to Dudley.

Recently an argument has been propounded that Crowley and others like him were patronised by less elevated but still powerful figures, particularly after the reign of Edward VI. In an article for the Foxe's Book of Martyrs Variorum Edition Online, Brett Usher has emphasised the importance of previously neglected work by T. S. Willin on Tudor merchants in London, particularly those associated with the Muscovy Company, which was established early in the reign of Mary I and traces its roots to the Company of Merchant Adventurers. At its inception, Sir George Barne, then Lord Mayor of London, was the principal figure in the Muscovy Company. Barne was praised by Bishop Ridley and prior to becoming bishop of Winchester, Robert Horne preached the funeral sermon for Barne's wife in 1559 after returning from exile on the continent. Barne's nephew and apprentice was Nicholas Culverwell whose younger brother Richard left money at his death in 1586 to Crowley as well as William Charke, Walter Travers, John Field, Thomas Crooke, Nicholas Crane, Thomas Edmonds, William Cheston and Giles Sinclair.

Earlier, under Henry VIII and Edward VI, the Merchant Adventurers included Thomas Poyntz, brother of Lady Anne Walsh in whose house Crowley had served as tutor. Poyntz was the head of the Merchant Adventurer's house in Antwerp; it was there that he sheltered William Tyndale as his sister had in England. John Foxe's 1563 biography of Tyndale concludes with an account probably written by Thomas Poyntz, and received from him or someone close to him. While Tyndale was with Poyntz in Antwerp, Richard Grafton was there as a merchant adventurer involved with Tyndale's project of publishing an English Bible. John Rogers, the first martyr under Mary I, whose "Matthew's Bible" later combined translations by Tyndale and Miles Coverdale, served as chaplain to the English merchants in Antwerp. Some of these merchants, like Grafton, were probably involved in producing and smuggling copies of Tyndale's New Testament and other Protestant texts into England. Another figure in the network of evangelical merchants with ties to Crowley was "the immensely rich John Quarles", who was "twice Master of the Drapers' Company" and "a friend and patron of Robert Crowley". (See Brett Usher, "Backing Protestantism: the London godly, the exchequer and the Foxe circle", in David Loades (ed.), John Foxe: an Historical Perspective (Aldershot, 1999), p. 129; T. S. Willan, The Muscovy Merchants of 1555 (Manchester, 1953), p. 118.)

== Ordination and Marian exile ==
Crowley was ordained deacon on 28 September or 29 September 1551 by Bishop Ridley, and referred to as "stationer of the Parish of St Andrew, Holborn". On 24 June the previous year, John Foxe had been ordained deacon by Ridley, after having taken up residence with the Duchess of Suffolk in the Barbican in order to be eligible. The anticipated reforms that would follow from the spreading influence of men like these were deferred by the death of the king and the accession of Mary I after the ill-fated attempt to put Lady Jane Grey on the throne.

Around 1553-1554, or 1555 at the latest, Crowley had left England. In 1557 records state he was a member of the Frankfurt congregation of English exiles and living in very crowded quarters with a wife and child. Local tax lists registered him as a "student", and expelled him at the same time as a poor and possessionless man.

According to A Briefe Discourse of the Troubles begun at Frankeford in Germany (1575), which covers events from 1554 onward, in 1557 Crowley's signature appeared with those endorsing "the new discipline" at Frankfurt (i.e., the Genevan church order), which limited the pastoral authority of Robert Horne over the congregation. Horne objected stridently as he was pushing for a more hierarchical system, and Crowley was among those who supported the presbyterian system. However, it must be remembered that this framing of events comes from the Briefe Discourse of the Troubles which was first published eighteen years later, evidently in support of the Elizabethan presbyterian faction. (For further discussion of the significance of these events to later Elizabethan church politics, see the entry on the Marian exiles.)

== Vestments controversy ==
Under Elizabeth I, Cowley returned to England and became, vicar of St Giles-without-Cripplegate. He became involved with Anglican Vestments Controversy when forced to wear vestments of give up his vicaring.

=== Reactions of protest in 1566 ===
One of those who signed nolo and a former Marian exile, Robert Crowley instigated the first open protest. Though he was suspended on March 28 for his nonconformity, he was among many who ignored their suspension. On April 23, Crowley confronted six laymen (some sources say choristers) of St Giles who had come to the church in surplices for a funeral. According to John Stow's Memoranda, Crowley stopped the funeral party at the door. Stow says Crowley declared "the church was his, and the queen had given it him during his life and made him vicar thereof, wherefore he would rule that place and would not suffer any such superstitious rags of Rome there to enter." By another account, Crowley was backed by his Curate and one Sayer who was Deputy of the Ward. In this version, Crowley ordered the men in surplices "to take off these porter's coats", with the Deputy threatening to knock them flat if they broke the peace. Either way, it seems Crowley succeeded in driving off the men in vestments.

Stow records two other incidents on April 7, Palm Sunday. At Little All Hallows on Thames Street, a nonconforming Scot precipitated a fight with his preaching. (Stow notes that the Scot typically preached twice a day at St Magnus-the-Martyr, where Miles Coverdale was rector. Coverdale was also ministering to a secret congregation at this time.) The sermon was directed against vestments with "bitter and vehement words" for the queen and conforming clergy. The minister of the church had conformed to preserve his vocation, but he was seen smiling at the preacher's "vehement talk". Noticing this, a dyer and a fishmonger questioned the minister, which led to an argument and a fight between pro- and anti-vestment parishioners. Stow mentions that by June 3, this Scot had changed his tune and was preaching in a surplice. For this, he was attacked by women who threw stones at him, pulled him out of the pulpit, tore his surplice, and scratched his face. Similar disturbances over vestments from 1566 to 1567 are described in Stow's Memoranda.

At St Mary Magdalen, where the minister had apparently been suspended, Stow says the parish succeeded in getting a minister appointed to serve communion on Palm Sunday, but when the conforming minister came away from the altar to read the gospel and epistle, a member of the congregation had his servant steal the cup and bread. This and Crowley's actions were related to Cecil in letters by Parker, who reported that the latter disturbance was instigated "because the bread was not common"—i.e. it was not an ordinary loaf of bread but a wafer that was used for the eucharist. Parker also reported that "divers churchwardens to make a trouble and a difficulty, will provide neither surplice nor bread" (Archbishop Parker's Correspondence, 278). Stow indicates there were many other such disturbances throughout the city on Palm Sunday and Easter.

At about this time, Bishop Grindal found that one Bartlett, divinity lecturer at St Giles, had been suspended but was still carrying out that office without a licence. "Three-score women of the same parish" appealed to Grindal on Bartlett's behalf but were rebuffed in preference for "a half-dozen of their husbands", as Grindal reported to Cecil (Grindal's Remains, 288–89). Crowley himself assumed this lectureship before the end of the year after being deprived and placed under house arrest, which indicates the cat-and-mouse game being played at the parish level to frustrate the campaign for conformity.

Crowley's actions at St Giles led to a complaint from the Lord Mayor to Archbishop Parker, and Parker summoned Crowley and Sayer, the Deputy of the Ward. Crowley expressed his willingness to go to prison, insisting he would not allow surplices and would not cease his duties unless he was discharged. Parker told him he was indeed discharged, and Crowley then declared he would only accept discharge from a law court, a clear shot at the weakness of Parker's authority. Crowley was put under house arrest in the custody of the bishop of Ely from June to October. Sayer, the Deputy, was bound over for £100 and was required to appear again before Parker if there was more trouble. Crowley stuck to his principles and was fully deprived after Parker's three-month grace period had elapsed, whereupon he was sent to Cox, the Bishop of Ely. On October 28, an order was issued to the Archbishop of Canterbury and the Bishop of London to settle Crowley's case (Archbishop Parker's Correspondence, 275f.). By 1568–69, Crowley had resigned or had been stripped of all his preferments. He returned to the printing trade, although that had been his immediate reaction in 1566 when he led the nonconformists in a bout of literary warfare. (See below.) In the face of such strong opposition from his subordinates and the laity, Parker feared for his life and continued to appeal to Cecil for backing from the government.

==== Literary warfare ====
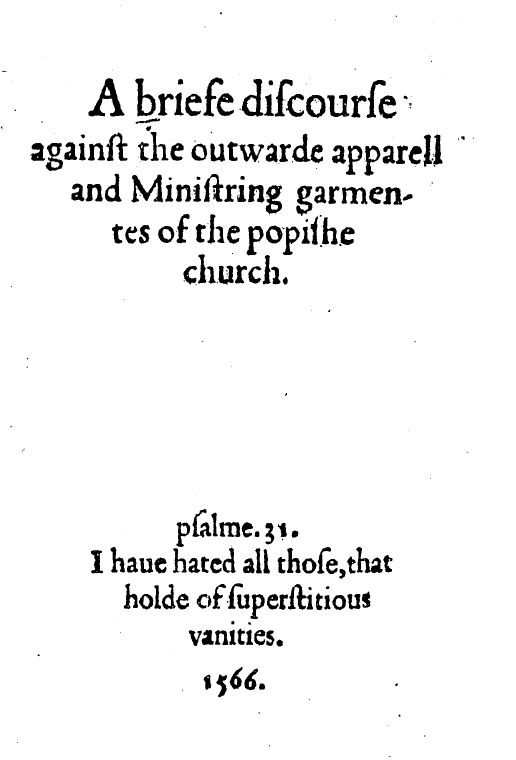
Title page to A Briefe Discourse Against the Outwarde Apparel of the Popishe Church (1566)

While under arrest, Crowley published three editions (including one in Emden) of A Briefe Discourse Against the Outwarde Apparel of the Popishe Church (1566). Patrick Collinson has called this "the earliest puritan manifesto". The title page quotes from Psalm 31; intriguingly, it is closest to the English of the Bishops' Bible (1568): "I have hated all those that holde of superstitious vanities". (See image at right.) Stow claims this work was a collaborative project, with all the nonconforming clergy giving their advice in writing to Crowley. At the same time, many other anti-vestiarian tracts were circulating in the streets and churches. By May, Henry Denham, the printer of A briefe Discourse, had been jailed, but the writers escaped punishment because, according to Stow, "they had friends enough to have set the whole realm together by the ears."

As his title suggests, Crowley inveighed relentlessly against the evil of vestments and stressed the direct responsibility of preachers to God rather than to men. Moreover, he stressed God's inevitable vengeance against the use of vestments and the responsibility of rulers for tolerance of such "vain toys". Arguing for the importance of edification based on 1 Corinthians 13:10, Ephesians 2:19–21 and Ephesians 4:11–17, Crowley states that unprofitable ceremonies and rites must be rejected, including vestments, until it is proved they will edify the church. Taking up the argument that vestments are indifferent, Crowley is clearer than Hooper as he focuses not on indifference in general but indifferent things in the church. Though the tenor of his writing and that of his compatriots is that vestments are inherently evil, Crowley grants that in themselves, they may be things indifferent, but crucially, when their use is harmful, they are no longer indifferent, and Crowley is certain they are harmful in their present use. They are a hindrance to the simple who regard vestments and the office of the priest superstitiously because their use encourages and confirms the papists. Crowley's circumventing of higher ecclesiastical and state authority is the most radical part of the text and defines a doctrine of passive resistance. However, in this, Crowley is close to the "moderate" view espoused by Calvin and Bullinger, as opposed to the more radical, active resistance arguments of John Knox and John Ponet. Nevertheless, Crowley's position was radical enough for his antagonists when he asserted that no human authority may contradict divine disapproval for that which is an abuse, even if the abuse arises from a thing that is indifferent. Crowley presents many other arguments from scripture, and he cites Bucer, Martyr, Ridley and Jewel as anti-vestment supporters. In the end, Crowley attacks his opponents as "bloudy persecuters" whose "purpose is ... to deface the glorious Gospell of Christ Jesus, which thing they shall never be able to bring to passe." A concluding prayer calls to God for the abolition of "al dregs of Poperie and superstition that presently trouble the state of thy Church."

A response to Crowley that is thought to have been commissioned by and/or written by Parker, also in 1566, notes how Crowley's argument challenges the royal supremacy and was tantamount to rebellion. (The full title is A Brief Examination for the Tyme of a Certaine Declaration Lately Put in Print in the name and defence of certaine ministers in London, refusyng to weare the apparell prescribed by the lawes and orders of the Realme.) Following an opening that expresses a reluctance to respond to folly, error, ignorance, and arrogance on its own terms, A Brief Examination engages in a point-by-point refutation of Crowley, wherein Bucer, Martyr and Ridley are marshalled for support. A new development emerges as a rebuttal of Crowley's elaboration of the argument that vestments are wholly negative. Now they are presented as positive goods, bringing more reverence and honor to the sacraments. The evil of disobedience to legitimate authority is a primary theme and is used to respond to the contention that vestments confuse the simple. Rather, it is argued that disobedience to authority is more likely to lead the simple astray. Further, as items conducive to order and decency, vestments are part of the church's general task as defined by Saint Paul, though they are not expressly mandated. Appended to the main argument are five translated letters exchanged under Edward VI between Bucer and Thomas Cranmer (one has a paragraph omitted that expresses reservations about vestments causing superstition) and between Hooper, a Lasco, Bucer and Martyr.

Following this retort came another nonconformist pamphlet, which J. W. Martin speculatively attributes to Crowley: An answere for the Tyme, to the examination put in print, without the author's name, pretending to mayntayne the apparrell prescribed against the declaration of the mynisters of London (1566). Nothing new is said, but vestments are now emphatically described as idolatrous abuses with reference to radically iconoclastic Old Testament texts. By this point, the idea that vestments are inherently indifferent had been virtually abandoned and seems to be contradicted at one point in the text. The contradiction is resolved, tenuously, with the point that vestments do possess a theoretical indifference apart from all practical considerations, but their past usage (i.e. their abuse) thoroughly determines their present and future evil and non-indifference. The author declares that vestments are monuments "of a thing that is left or set up for a remembraunce, which is Idolatry, and not onely remembraunce, but some aestimacion: therefore they are monumentes of idolatry." The argument in A Brief Examination for the church's prerogative in establishing practices not expressly mandated in scripture is gleefully attacked as an open door to papistry and paganism: the mass, the pope, purgatory, and even the worship of Neptune are not expressly forbidden, but that does not make them permissible. It becomes clear in the development of this point that the nonconformist faction believed that the Bible always had at least a general relevance to every possible question and activity: "the scripture hath left nothing free or indifferent to mens lawes, but it must agree with those generalle condicions before rehearsed, and such like." On the issue of authority and obedience, the author grants that one should often obey even when evil is commanded by legitimate authorities, but such authority is said not to extend beyond temporal (as opposed to ecclesiastical) matters—a point in which we may see a clear origin of English anti-prelatical/anti-episcopal sentiment and separatism. The author regards it as more dangerous for the monarch to exercise his authority beyond what scripture allows than for subjects to restrain this authority. Every minister must be able to judge the laws to see if they are in line "wyth gods word or no". Moreover, even the lowest in the ecclesiastical hierarchy are ascribed as great an authority regarding "the ministration of the word and sacraments" as any bishop.
