= Furneaux =

Furneaux may refer to:

People

- Furneaux (surname)

Other

- Chapman and Furneaux, steam locomotive manufacturer with a works situated in Gateshead, Tyne and Wear, UK
- Furneaux Group, group of 52 islands, at the eastern end of Bass Strait, between Victoria and Tasmania, Australia
  - Furneaux bioregion, an Australian biogeographic region that comprises the Furneaux Group
  - Furneaux burrowing crayfish (Engaeus martigener), a freshwater crayfish found in Australia
- Furneaux Pelham, village and civil parish in Hertfordshire, England
- Viscount Furneaux or Earl of Birkenhead, title in the Peerage of the United Kingdom

== See also ==
- Fourneau, surname
- Fourneaux (disambiguation)
