= John Warner (physician) =

English academic, cleric and physician

John Warner (died 1565) was an English academic, cleric, and physician. He was the first Regius Professor of Physic at the University of Oxford, as well as the Vice-Chancellor of the University of Oxford and the Dean of Winchester.

Warner was born in Great Stanmore, Middlesex, England, son of John (died 1545) and his wife Margaret, and studied at the University of Oxford, receiving a Bachelor of Arts in 1520, a Master of Arts in 1525, a Bachelor of Medicine in 1529, and a Doctor of Medicine in 1535. Following his BA, he was elected fellow of All Souls College, Oxford, and on 26 May 1536 was elected Warden of All Souls College. Henry VIII appointed him as the inaugural Regius Professor of Physic in 1540. He retired in 1554 from this professorship, and became Vice-Chancellor of the university. He became a fellow of the College of Physicians on 17 October 1561.

Warner was also ordained and served in various parishes as rector, prebend, Archdeacon of Cleveland, canon, and royal chaplain, and was nominated as Dean of Winchester on 15 October 1559.

Church of England titles
Preceded by Edmund Steward	Dean of Winchester; 1559–1565	Succeeded by Francis Newton
Academic offices
Preceded by Richard Marshall	Vice-Chancellor of Oxford University; 1554–1555	Succeeded by Richard Smyth
Preceded by William Tresham	Vice-Chancellor of Oxford University; 1559–1560	Succeeded by Francis Babbington
