= John Watson (bishop) =

English Anglican bishop (1520–1584)

- Bishop of Winchester
- Diocese: Diocese of Winchester
- In office: 1580–1584
- Predecessor: Robert Horne
- Successor: Thomas Cooper
- Other posts: Archdeacon of Surrey (1559–?); Dean of Winchester (1573–1580)

Orders
- Ordination: 24 September 1558 (deacon) by Richard Pate
- Consecration: 18 September 1580

Personal details
- Born: 1520 Evesham, Worcestershire
- Died: 1584 (aged 63–64) Winchester, Hampshire
- Buried: Winchester Cathedral
- Education: Oxford University

John Watson (1520–1584) was an English Anglican bishop who served as Bishop of Winchester in the 1580s.

== Early life and family ==
He was born in Evesham, Worcestershire, England, the son of Thomas Watson and Agnes née Weeks. Thomas Watson was born in Evesham around 1491 and in 1544 purchased part of the former Evesham Abbey lands and the lordship of Bengeworth, across the River Avon from Evesham town. On those lands he built a fine Tudor house as the family home. It was named the Mansion House, and though much modified, retained that name until about 1970, when it was renamed the Evesham Hotel, which name it still bears in 2020. John graduated Bachelor of Arts (BA) from Oxford University in June 1539 and he was elected Fellow of All Souls College, Oxford in 1540; on 25 June 1544, he was incepted Master of Arts (Oxford) (MA Oxon).

== Early career ==
He became a canon of Winchester Cathedral (of the eleventh prebend) in 1551 — he was presented by the king (Edward VI) on 9 December; instituted by the bishop (John Ponet) on 14 December and installed by proxy on the same day. A few years later, while remaining canon (but now under the reign of Queen Mary), he additionally became rector of Kelshall (until 1578) and of Winchfield (until 1561) in April 1554. He was not in orders until 1557, when he was made subdeacon by Thomas Chetham, titular Bishop of Sidon and assistant bishop of London; he was then made deacon on 24 September 1558 by Richard Pate, Bishop of Worcester, in London.

Meanwhile, he was collated to the chancellorship of St Paul's Cathedral, London, on 7 February 1557/58 by Edmund Bonner, Bishop of London; he retained this stall until he became a bishop in 1580; later in 1558, he resigned the 11th prebend of Winchester. In 1559, he was appointed Master of the Hospital of St Cross (by letters patent dated 17 August), canon of the 1st prebend at Winchester (he was presented by the queen {Queen Elizabeth}, then installed on 26 August; he held this prebend until he was made dean), and Archdeacon of Surrey (presented by the queen 7 November, instituted 16 November, resigned by February 1573). He also became rector of South Warnborough (1568–1581). (Someone called John Watson was a canon of Lincoln {prebend of Langford Manor}, 1560–1574, but it is doubtful this was the same man.)

== Dean and Bishop of Winchester ==
Watson became Dean of Winchester (head of Winchester Cathedral) in 1573 after Francis Newton died: he was presented by the queen on 9 February, instituted by the bishop (Robert Horne) on 13 February and installed the next day; he served until he became bishop. He graduated as Doctor of Medicine from Oxford on 27 July 1575 and practised medicine.

Watson paid Robert Dudley, 1st Earl of Leicester, 200 pounds to lobby for him not being made a bishop. The earl lobbied Queen Elizabeth I saying "how otherwise it would be £200 out of his way". Elizabeth responded "Nay, then, Watson shall have it, he being more worthy thereof, who will give £200 to decline, than he who will give £2000 to attain it." Queen Elizabeth I bestowed the position See of Winchester on Watson. He was elected to Winchester on 29 June, royal assent was given on 18 July, and his election was confirmed on 16 September 1580. He was then consecrated as a bishop on 18 September and enthroned on 8 November. Because he had served under Queen Mary, Watson was sometimes suspected of leniency towards catholics, but evidence of his tenure as bishop shows he was engaged in suppressing papism.

== Death and legacy ==
Watson died on 23 January 1583/84 in Winchester. He was buried on 17 February 1583/84 in the nave of Winchester Cathedral, adjoining the 8th bay of the North aisle 1.

His will dated 22 October 1584 was proved citing Sir Francis Walsingham as Chief Overseer.

The burial stone of Bishop Watson is in Winchester Cathedral on the north side of the nave in the 5th bay westward from the tower pillars. It is of a shelly limestone polished to resemble marble. The inscription in Latin is:

JOHANNES WATSON HVIVS ECCLESIAE WINTON PRAEBENDARIVS DECANVS AC DEINDE ESPICOPVS PRVDENTISSIMVS PATER, VIR OPTIMVS PRAECIPVE ERGA INOPES MISERCORS OBIT IN DOMINO JANUAR 23 ANNO AETATIS 63, EPISCOPATVS 4, 1583

John Watson, Prebendary Church In Winchester, Dean and then Bishop, a very wise father, A very good man, tender especially towards the Needy. He died in the Lord January 23rd. In the 63rd, year of his age, the 4th of his Bishopric, 1583

Church of England titles
Preceded by Robert Horne	Bishop of Winchester; 1580–1584	Succeeded by Thomas Cooper
