= Mark Steward =

Member of Parliament

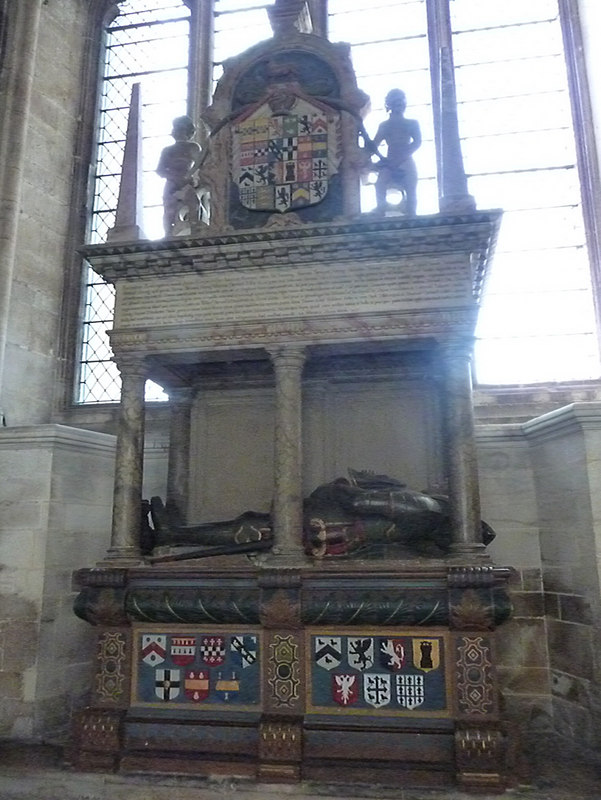
Monument and effigy of Sir Mark Steward in Ely Cathedral

Sir Mark Steward (1524–1604), of Heckfield in Hampshire and of Stuntney in Cambridgeshire, served as a Member of Parliament for Stockbridge in Hampshire (1597) and for St Ives in Cornwall (1588–9). He was knighted in 1603.

== Origins ==
He was the 3rd son of Simeon Steward of Lakenheath in Suffolk by his wife Joan Besteney, daughter and heiress of Edward Besteney of Soham in Cambridgeshire. His uncles included Robert Steward (died 1557), Dean of Ely, and Edmund Steward (died 1559), Dean of Winchester 1554–1559 and another who became Pastor of the English congregation at Frankfurt where he was an associate of John Knox. The Steward family had been settled in East Anglia from the fifteenth century.

== Career ==
As a younger son with no paternal inheritance, he was obliged to make his own career.

== Marriage and issue ==
He married Anna Huick, a daughter of Robert Huick, MP, physician to Queen Elizabeth I, by whom he had issue one son and one daughter:

- Sir Simon Steward (1575–1632), MP, of Stuntney.
- Mary Steward, wife of Sir William Forster (d.1618), Knight of the Bath, and mother of Sir Humphrey Forster, 1st Baronet (1595–1663), of Aldermaston in Berkshire.

Upon Steward's death, Ann married secondly Giles Killingworth of Pampisford & Balsham Place Manor She died before September 1617 when Killingworth remarried.

== Death, burial and succession ==
He died in March 1604 and was buried in Ely Cathedral, where survives his elaborate monument with recumbent effigy, his uncle Robert Steward (died 1557) having been the last Prior of Ely Abbey before the Dissolution of the Monasteries and afterwards the first Dean of Ely Cathedral. His estate of Stuntney in Cambridgeshire was eventually inherited by his cousin Elizabeth Steward and her son, Oliver Cromwell, Lord Protector.
