= Walter Lynne =

Flemish publisher and translator (fl. 1550)

Walter Lynne (fl. 1550) was a Flemish publisher and translator, known as a Protestant publisher in London.

== Life ==
Lynne lived at Somers Quay, near Billingsgate in London, and also seems to have kept a shop at the sign of the Eagle, near St Paul's School. As his dedications and prefaces show, he was an ardent reformer; he printed and translated works of a religious kind and enjoyed the patronage of Thomas Cranmer. His mark consisted of a ram and a goat, with the letters W. and L.

== Works ==
Lynne's major published translations were:

- The Beginning and Endynge of all Popery, or Popishe Kyngedome, London, 1548, from the German, printed by Herford, with woodcuts. This work was derived from the Vaticinia of Joachim of Fiore, via a German translation.
- A version in English of Cranmer's Catechismus (a Latin translation from the German of Justus Jonas), London, 1548. Two editions the same year, one printed by Nicolas Hyll.
- A Declaration of the Twelve Articles of the Christen Faith, London, 1548; translated from the German of Urban Regius and printed by Richard Jugge.
- The Divisyon of the Places of the Lawe and of the Gospell …, by Petrus Artopoeus (Peter Becker 1491–1563), with two Orations of Prayeng to God made by S. John Chrisostome, London, 1548, printed by Lynne. Another edition has no date.
- A Frutefull and Godly Exposition and Declaracion of the Kyngdom of Christ, two of Martin Luther's sermons, with "a godly sermon of U. Regius", London, 1548, printed for Lynne and dedicated to the Princess Elizabeth.
- The chiefe and pryncypall Articles of the Christen Faythe … with other thre … bokes [viz.] the Confessyon of the Faythe of Doctor M. Luther. Of the ryght Olde Catholyke Churche. … The three Symboles … of the Christen Faythe, in the Churche unfourmely used. Also A Singular and Fruteful Maner of Prayeng used by … M. Luther, London, 1548, printed for Lynne.
- A lytle Treatise after the maner of an Epistle, London, 1548, translated from Regius.
- Luther's three Sermons on Sickness and Burial (Watt), London, 1549.
- A Treatise or Sermon (by Heinrich Bullinger), concernynge Magistrates and Obedience of Subjects, London, 1549, printed for Lynne, who added an epistle and dedication to Edward VI.
- The Thre Bokes of Cronicles by Johann Carion, with Johann Funck's appendix, London, 1550, printed for Lynne, who added a preface on the use of reading history; dedicated to Edward VI.
- A brief and a compendious Table in maner of a Concordaunce, openyng the waye to the Principall Histories of the whole Bible, London, 1550, 1563, from the German of Bullinger, Leo Juda, Konrad Pellicanus, and others. Lynne added a translation of the third book of Maccabees, and dedicated the whole to the Duchess of Somerset.

Among Lynne's publications was The true Beliefe in Christ and his Sacramentes set forth in a Dialogue, London, 1550; a translation from Dutch by William Roy, with a dedication to Anne Seymour, Duchess of Somerset, by Lynne, who perhaps only printed the title-page and first three leaves; the rest was printed abroad. He also published the following:

- Treatise of the right Worshipping of Christ, London, 1548.
- John Ponet's Tragœdie or Dialoge of the unjuste usurped Primacie of the Bishop of Rome (translation from Ochinus), London, 1549.
- Ponet's sermon "concerninge the ryght use of the Lordes Supper", London, 1550.
- An edition of Thomas Becon's Spirytual and Precious Pearle, London, 1550.
- An edition of Thomas Norton's translation of Peter Martyr's Epistle unto the … Duke of Somerset, London, 1550.
- A Catechisme, n.d.
- Story's translations from St. Augustine, n.d.
- The Vertuous Scholehous of Ungracious Women, n.d.

== Notes ==
Attribution

This article incorporates text from a publication now in the public domain: Lee, Sidney, ed. (1893). "Lynne, Walter". Dictionary of National Biography. Vol. 34. London: Smith, Elder & Co.
