= William Kingsmill =

William Kingsmill may refer to:

- William Kingsmill (politician) (1905–1971), British politician and businessman
- William Kingsmill (priest) (died 1549), last Prior of Winchester; first Dean of Winchester, 1541–1549
- William Kingsmill (died 1618), English landowner
