= Nicholas Steward =

Nicholas Steward may refer to:

- Nicholas Steward (MP for Cambridge University) (1547–1633), MP for Cambridge University, 1604–1611
- Sir Nicholas Steward, 1st Baronet (1618–1710), MP for Lymington, 1663–1679
