= John Mason (diplomat, born 1503) =

English diplomat

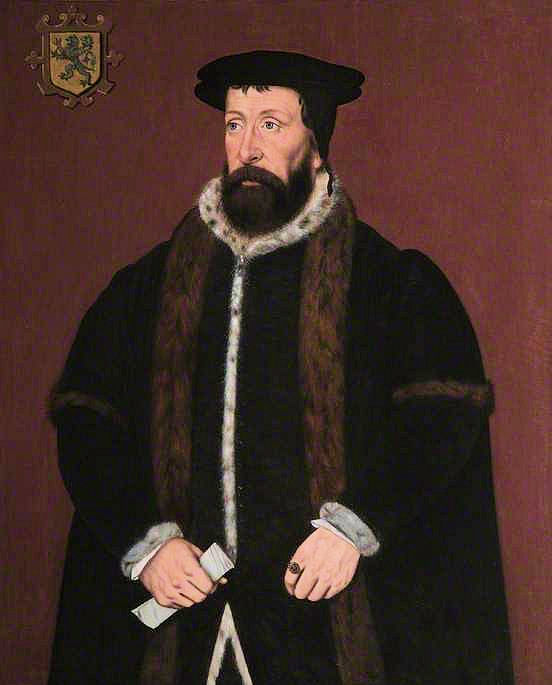
- Painting of Sir John Mason attributed to Sampson Strong, 1607. From the collection of Christ's Hospital, Abingdon
- Born: c. 1503; Abingdon, Berkshire, England
- Died: 20 April 1566; London, England
- Other name: Sir John Mason
- Occupations: Diplomat, spy, MP
- Known for: Chancellor of the University of Oxford
- Children: Mary Cheke (stepchild)

Sir John Mason (1503 – 20 April 1566) was an English diplomat and spy.

== Origins and education ==
Mason was born to humble parents in Abingdon in Berkshire (now Oxfordshire) in 1503. His father is said to have been a cowherd, his mother was the sister of a monk at Abingdon Abbey; possibly Thomas Rowland, the last abbot. Alternatively, there are rumours that Mason was, in fact, the abbot's illegitimate son.

Whatever his family connection to the boy, Rowland played an important role in his education, sending him to the abbey school, followed by All Souls College, Oxford, where he became a Fellow in 1521, got his B.A. on 8 July 1521, and his M.A. on 21 February 1525. He was also ordained as an acolyte in 1521.

At Oxford he attracted the attention of Sir Thomas More, who prevailed upon Henry VIII to appoint him King's scholar in Paris, with an annual allowance of £3 6s 8d, which was doubled in 1531. His income was further boosted by the addition of the first of many ecclesiastical benefices: the rectory of Kingston Bagpuize in Berkshire.

== Career ==
He was appointed Clerk of the Parliaments in July 1550, succeeding William Paget, 1st Baron Paget (to whom he had been deputy since January 1542), although it seems the two shared the office from December 1551.

He became Chancellor of the University of Oxford for the periods 1552–1556 and 1559–1564.

He was Member of parliament for Reading in 1547, and for Hampshire on four occasions between 1554 and 1563.

He worked for several Tudor monarchs collecting information from the Continent and as a diplomat. He was knighted by Edward VI and made Dean of Winchester.

John Mason School, a secondary school in Abingdon, is named after him.

== See also ==
- List of Old Abingdonians

Government offices
Preceded by William Paget	Clerk of the Privy Council; 1543–1545; With: William Honnyng	Succeeded by William Honnyng; Thomas Chaloner
Church of England titles
Preceded by Roger Tonge	Dean of Winchester; 1549–1554	Succeeded by Edmund Steward
Academic offices
Preceded by Richard Cox	Chancellor of the University of Oxford; 1552–1556	Succeeded by Reginald Pole
Preceded by Earl of Arundel	Chancellor of the University of Oxford; 1559–1564	Succeeded by Earl of Leicester
Parliament of England
Preceded by William Grey; John Marshe	Member of Parliament for Reading; 1547; With: John Marshe	Succeeded by John Bourne; John Winchcombe
Preceded by Sir Thomas White; Nicholas Tichborne	Member of Parliament for Hampshire; 1554 (Apr); With: Sir Thomas White	Succeeded by Sir Thomas White; John Norton
Preceded by Sir Thomas White; John Norton	Member of Parliament for Hampshire; 1558–1566; With: Sir Thomas White (1558–1562); William Uvedale (1562–1566)	Succeeded by Sir John Berkeley; William Uvedale
