= William Holden Hutton =

British historian and priest

The Very Reverend William Holden Hutton

Dean of Winchester
- In office 1919–1930

Personal details
- Born: 24 May 1860 Lincolnshire, England
- Died: 24 October 1930 (aged 70)

William Holden Hutton (24 May 1860 – 24 October 1930) was a British historian and a priest of the Church of England. He was Dean of Winchester from 1919 to 1930.

== Biography ==
William Holden Hutton was born in England on 24 May 1860, in Lincolnshire, where his father was rector of Gate Burton. He studied at Magdalen College, Oxford, where he graduated with a first class degree in Modern History in 1881. He was a fellow at St John's College, Oxford, from 1884 to 1923, and an honorary fellow thereafter; and from 1889 to 1909 was a tutor at the college. Between 1895 and 1897 he also lectured on Church history at Cambridge University. During this period he had a house at Burford and wrote about Burford and the Cotswolds in some of his books.

In March 1901 he was appointed a curator of the Indian Institute at the University of Oxford, and in 1903 he delivered the Bampton lectures.

In 1911, at the prompting of Bishop Carr Glyn of Peterborough, he began serving as Archdeacon of Northampton and a canon residentiary of Peterborough Cathedral. During this period he revisited Oxford as a university reader in Indian history. He found the climate at Peterborough was not good for his health.

From 1919 he accepted the deanery of Winchester Cathedral, with a house suitable for his large library. His continuing ill-health did not prevent him from being a ready host. He was also a generous helper to the young.

He wrote several historical works, chiefly on the Church in Britain, and was a copious reviewer.

He authored the biography of Richard Wellesley (1893) for the Rulers of India series.

He died on 24 October 1930.

== Publications ==
- William Laud (London, 1895)
- Constantinople: The Story of the Old Capital of the Empire (London, 1900)
- as editor: Letters of William Stubbs, Bishop of Oxford, 1825–1901 (London, 1904) (See William Stubbs.)
- as editor: Simon de Montfort and His Cause, 1251-1266, 3rd edition (London, 1907)
- Highways and Byways in Shakespeare's Country (London, 1914)

== Notes ==
Church of England titles
Preceded by William Mordaunt Furneaux	Dean of Winchester; 1919–1930	Succeeded by Edward Gordon Selwyn
