= Richard Meggot =

English cleric (died 1692)

- Died: December 7, 1692
- Education: Queens' College, Cambridge
- Religion: Anglicanism
- Church: Church of England
- Offices held: Canon of Windsor (1677–1692)
- Title: Dean of Winchester

Richard Meggot (died 7 December 1692) was a Canon of Windsor from 1677 to 1692 and Dean of Winchester from 1679 to 1692.

== Career ==
He was educated at Queens' College, Cambridge, where he graduated BA 1653, MA 1657 and DD in 1669.

He was appointed:

- Rector of St Olave's Church, Southwark 1662;
- Vicar of Twickenham 1668–1687;
- Chaplain in ordinary of King Charles II 1672.

He was appointed to the eighth stall in St George's Chapel, Windsor Castle in 1677, and held the stall until 1692.
