= William Samuel Furneaux =

British science teacher and nature writer

William Samuel Furneaux (2 June 1855, Devonport – 1940) was a British science teacher and nature writer. Furneaux gained considerable fame in the 1890s and early twentieth century for his popular books on butterflies, moths, pond animals, and plants from the English countryside.

According to James Ritchie, Furneaux's books are succinct, well-illustrated, and among the best for stimulating young naturalists.

== Works ==
- Outdoor World. 1893.
- British Butterflies and Moths. 1894.
- Life in Ponds and Streams. 1896.
- The Out-Door World. 1900.
- The Sea Shore. 1903.
- Field and Woodland Plants. 1909.

== See also ==
- William Furneaux (1848–1928)
