= Thomas Cheyney (priest) =

Priest

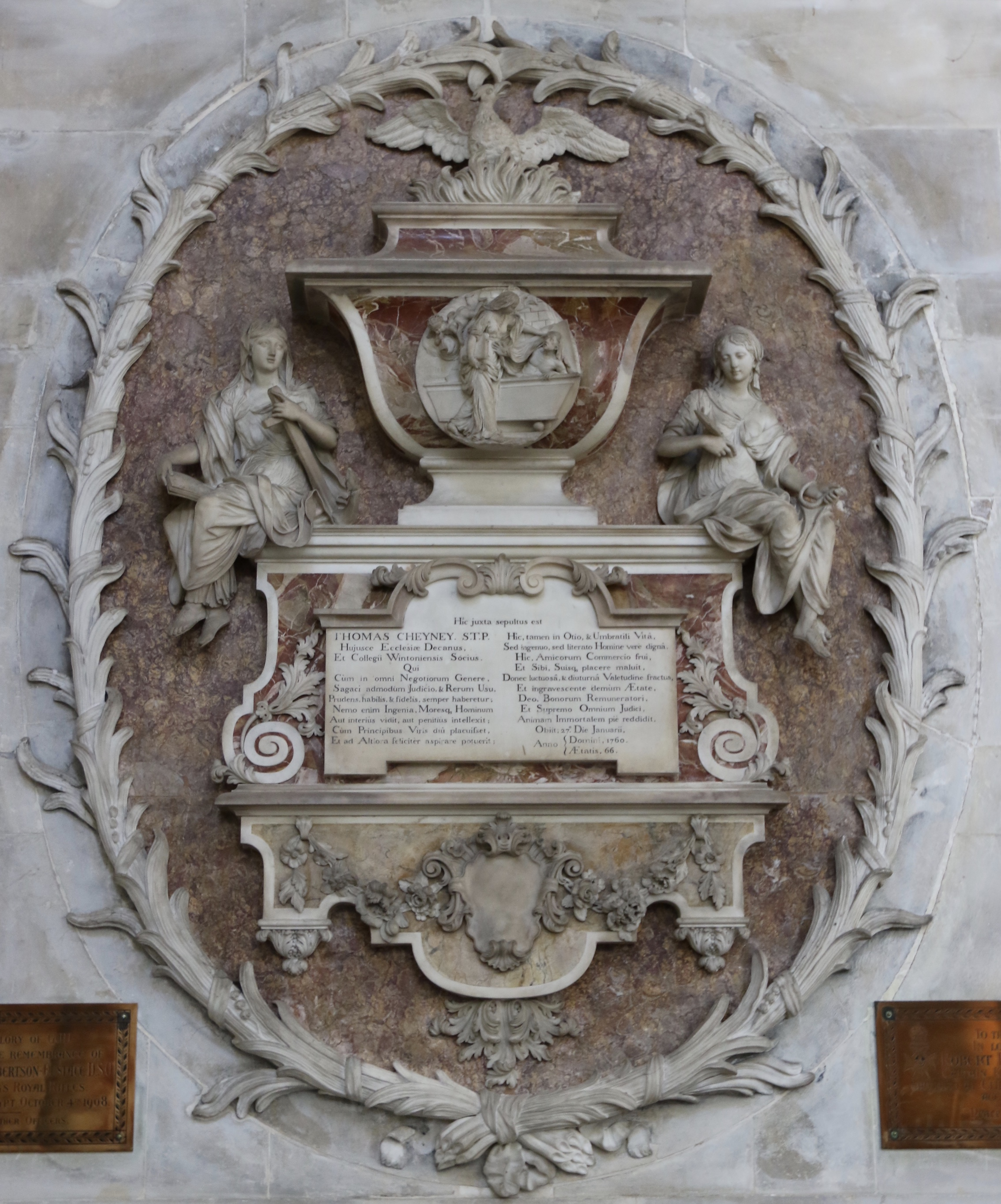
Cheyney's tomb in Winchester Cathedral.

Thomas Cheney or Cheyney (1694 – 27 January 1760) was a priest of Church of England, who served as Dean of Lincoln from 1744 to 1748 and Dean of Winchester from 25 March 1748 to 1760. He was the only son of another Thomas Cheyney, prebendary of Wells Cathedral and master at Winchester College. Thomas junior was educated at Winchester College and New College, Oxford Winchester College's archives contain several letters to him.

== Bibliography ==
- G H Blore, Thomas Cheyney, Wykehamist, Dean of Winchester (Winchester: The Wykeham Press, 1950)
