= James Atwell =

English priest (1946–2020)

The Very Reverend James Atwell
- Dean of Winchester
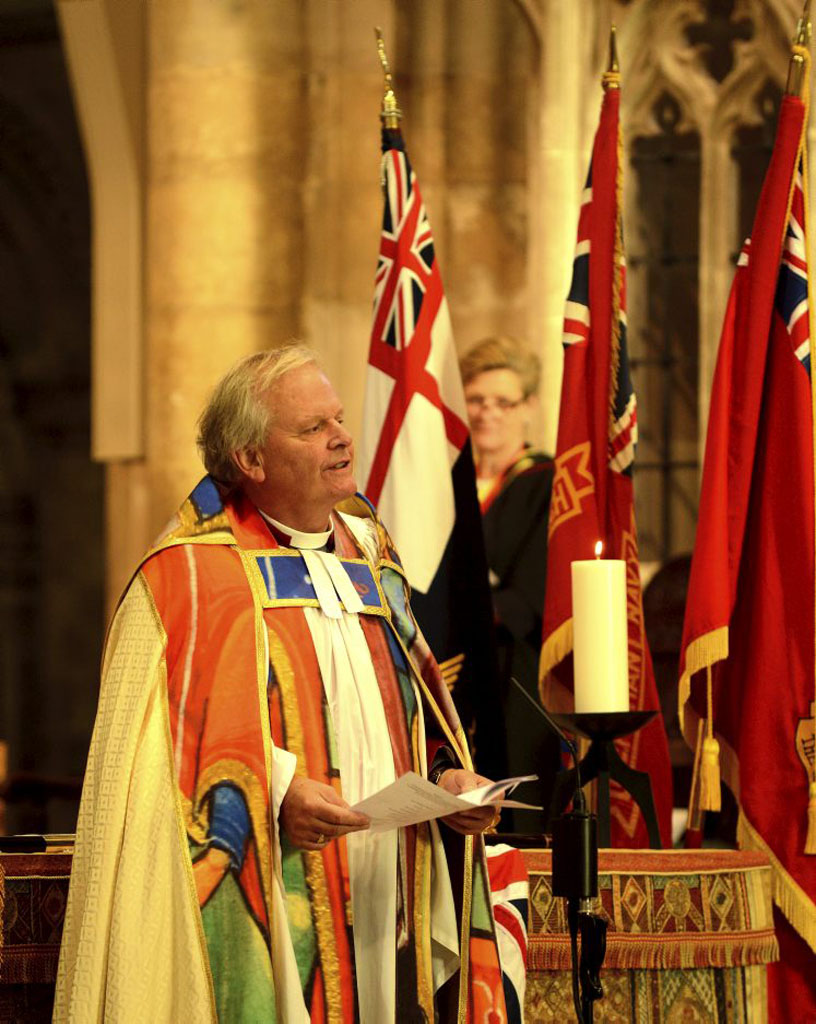
- Atwell in 2013
- Church: Church of England
- Diocese: Diocese of Winchester
- In office: 2006–2016
- Predecessor: Michael Till
- Successor: Catherine Ogle
- Other post: Dean of St Edmundsbury (1995–2006; Provost until 2000)

Personal details
- Born: 3 June 1946 Calne, Wiltshire, England
- Died: 12 December 2020 (aged 74)
- Denomination: Church of England
- Spouse: Lorna Atwell
- Education: Exeter College, Oxford

James Edgar Atwell (3 June 1946 – 12 December 2020) was an English priest who was Dean of Winchester.

== Biography ==
James Edgar Atwell was born on 2 June 1946. He was educated at Dauntsey's and Exeter College, Oxford. He went to theological college at Cuddesdon and was ordained in 1971. He began his ordained ministry with a curacy at St John the Evangelist, East Dulwich after which he was curate at Church of St Mary the Great, Cambridge and Chaplain at Jesus College, Cambridge. He has a Master of Arts (MA Oxon) and a Bachelor of Divinity (BD).

From Cambridge he became Vicar of St Lawrence, Towcester and then Provost of St Edmundsbury Cathedral before becoming (automatically, due to the Cathedrals Measure) Dean of St Edmundsbury on 19 November 2000. Having received Letters Patent from Elizabeth II, he was installed in Winchester Cathedral at a service on Lady Day, 25 March 2006.

On 12 February 2016, it was announced that Atwell was to retire as Dean of Winchester effective 14 July.

Atwell died on 12 December 2020, at the age of 74.

== Bibliography ==
- Sources of the Old Testament: A Guide to the Religious Thought of the Hebrew Bible (Understanding the Bible & Its World), T. & T. Clark Ltd, 1 April 2004. ISBN 978-0567084637

Church of England titles
Preceded by Michael Till	Dean of Winchester; 2006–2016	Succeeded by Catherine Ogle
