= Fourneau =

Fourneau is a French surname. Notable people with the surname include:

- Ernest Fourneau (1872–1949), French medicinal chemist
- Jean-Claude Fourneau (1907–1981), French surrealist painter
- Léon Fourneau (1900–?), Belgian middle-distance runner
- Marie-Therese Fourneau (1924―2000), French classical pianist

== See also ==
- Furneaux (surname)
