= Furneaux (surname) =

Furneaux is a Norman-French locational surname.

Notable people with this name include:

- Charles Furneaux (1835–1913), drawing instructor in the Boston area
- Constance Furneaux (1916–2003?), British middle-distance runner
- Furneaux Cook (1839–1903), English opera singer and actor
- Henry Furneaux (1829–1900), British classical scholar, specialising in Tacitus
- Karen Furneaux (born 1976), Canadian sprint kayaker who has been competing since 1988
- Ky Furneaux (born 1973), Australian outdoor guide, TV host, female survival expert and stunt person
- Peter Furneaux (1935–2014), English football club chairman and investor
- Philip Furneaux (1726–1783), English independent minister
- Robert Furneaux Jordan (1905–1978), English architect, architectural critic and novelist
- Robin Furneaux or Frederick Smith (1936–1985), 3rd Earl of Birkenhead
- Thomas Furneaux Lennon or Thomas Lennon (filmmaker), documentary filmmaker
- Tobias Furneaux (1735–1781), English navigator and Royal Navy officer, accompanied James Cook on his second voyage of exploration
- William Mordaunt Furneaux or William Furneaux, Dean of Winchester in the early decades of the 20th century
- William Samuel Furneaux (1855– 1940), British science teacher and nature writer
- Yvonne Furneaux (1926–2024), French film actress
