= Miles Huggarde =

Miles Huggarde or Myles Hogarde (fl. 1533 – 1557), was an English religious pamphleteer and opponent of the Protestant Reformation. He has been described as the best of Roman Catholic propagandists in the bitter pamphlet war of 1553–1558 during the reign of Queen Mary I.

Huggarde is stated to have been a shoemaker or hosier in London, and the first writer for the Catholic cause who had not received a monastic or academic education. He lived in Pudding Lane at the northern edge of London Bridge. In 1553 he was made hosier to Queen Mary and allocated a shilling a quarter. But he was not prosperous enough to be made a member of the Haberdashers Company, or a Freeman of the City, or to leave a will.

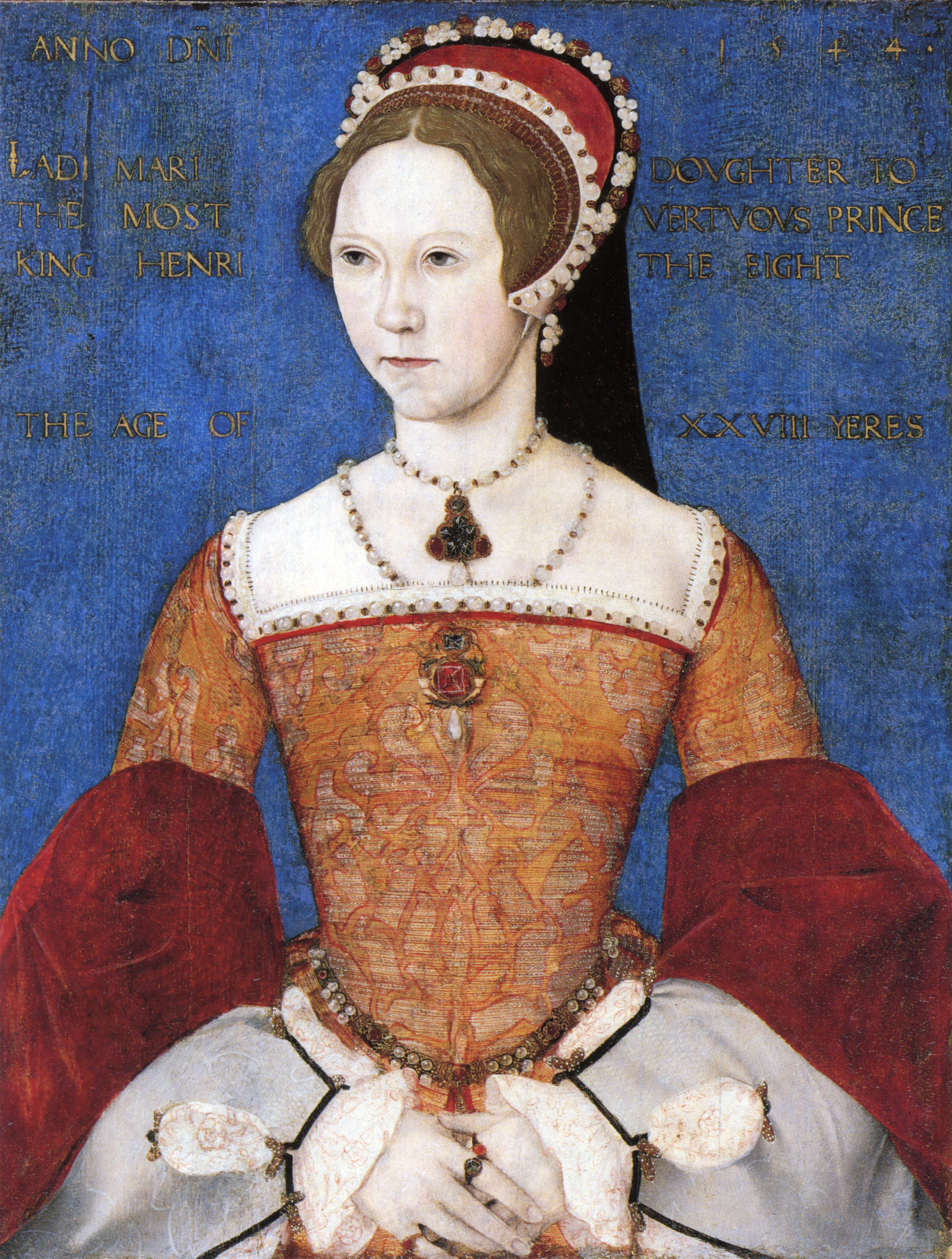
Mary Tudor, under whose reign Huggarde was most active as a pamphleteer

The 17th-century antiquarian, Anthony Wood, described him as, "the first trader or mechanic that appeared in print for the catholic cause". Huggarde exemplified the gradual spread of literacy and printing, and the rising importance of the laity in religious affairs in England. His earliest work, "The Abuse of the Blessed Sacrament of the Aultare", was written at the end of the reign of King Henry VIII and tackled the denigration of the Eucharist which had developed among some reforming groups. However, he published the remainder of his works during the reign of Queen Mary Tudor, most notable of which was the "Displaying of the Protestants, and sondry their Practises" written in 1556.

Huggarde was noticed by leading men on the Protestant side, and as one of the most indefatigable opponents of the Reformation during the reign of Mary I he attracted a lot of criticism. The writers against him included Laurence Humphrey, Robert Crowley, William Keth, and John Plough.

John Foxe reported how the Kent gentleman, Thomas Haukes, had challenged him on where he lived and his trade at a disputation at Bishop Bonner's house: "Ye can better skille to eate a pudding and make a hose then in scripture eyther to aunswere or oppose". Another Protestant opponent, Bishop Bale, also punned on his name calling him 'insanus Porcarius' and 'Milo Porcarius, vel Hoggardus, servorum Dei malignus proditor,' and ridiculed him for endeavouring to prove the necessity of fasting from Virgil's Æneid and Cicero's Tusculanae Disputationes. John Strype spoke of him disparagingly, remarking that "he set him self to oppose and abuse the gospellers, being set on and encouraged by priests and massmongers, with whom he much consorted, and was sometimes with them at Bishop Bonner's house."

Huggarde was living in the last year of Mary's reign, and in the title-pages of several of his works he describes himself as 'servant to the Queene's most excellent Majestie.'

== Works ==
- The Abuse of the Blessed Sacrament of the Aultare, a poem, published towards the close of the reign of Henry VIII. Robert Crowley wrote a Confutation, London, 1548, 8vo, with which the whole of Huggarde's poem was reprinted.
- The Assault of the Sacrament of the Altar; containyng as well six severall Assaults, made from tyme to tyme, against the said blessed Sacrament; as also the names and opinions of all the hereticall Captains of the same Assaults. Written in … 1549, by Myles Huggarde, and dedicated to the Quenes most excellent Maiestie, being then Ladie Marie; in whiche tyme (heresie then reigning) it could take no place, London, 1554, 4to; in verse.
- A new treatyse in maner of a Dialogue, which sheweth the excellency of maňes nature, in that he is made to the image of God, London, 1550, 4to, black letter, in verse.
- Treatise of three Weddings, 1550, 4to.
- A treatise entitled the Path waye to the towre of perfection, London (R. Caley), 1554, 4to; London, 1556, 4to; in verse. An analysis of this work is given in Brydges and Haslewood's British Bibliographer, iv. 67.
- A Mirrour of Loue, which such Light doth giue, That all men may learn, how to loue and liue, London [1555], 4to, in verse; dedicated to Queen Mary.
- The Displaying of the Protestants, and sondry their Practises, with a Description of divers their abuses of late frequented within their malignaunte churche. Perused and set forte with thassent of authoritie, according to the order in that behalf appointed (anon.), London, 1556, 8vo, black letter. In reply to this work John Plough published at Basel An Apology for the Protestants. Dr. Laurence Humphrey, William Heth, and others joined in the attack upon Huggarde.
- A Short Treatise in Meter upon the cxxix Psalme of Dauid, called De Profundis, London, 1556, 4to.
- New A B C, paraphrastically applied as the State of the World doth at this day require, London, 1557, 4to.
- A Myrrovre of myserie, newly compiled and sett for the [ ] by Myles Huggarde seruaunt to ye quenes moste excellente maiestie, 1557, 4to, manuscript in the Huth Library. It is a poem in the tradition of speculum literature, written in seven-line stanzas. It is dedicated in verse to the queen, and is most beautifully written on vellum, having the royal arms in the lower centre, and a curious drawing before the poem itself. Following the dedication is a prologue in twelve stanzas of four lines each. Published in an edition by Sebasian Sobecki.
- Songs and religious poems, in British Library . Addit. MS. 15233.
- A poem, containing 113 seven-line stanzas, of controversy against the reformers, in Harleian MS. 3444, which once belonged to Queen Mary.
