= Michael Till =

British Dean

The Very Reverend Michael Stanley Till

Dean of Winchester
- In office 1996–2005

Personal details
- Born: 19 November 1935
- Died: 4 December 2012 (aged 77)

Michael Stanley Till (19 November 1935 – 4 December 2012) was Dean of Winchester between 1996 and 2005.

== Biography ==
Michael Stanley Till was educated at Lincoln College, Oxford and ordained in 1965. He began his career with a curacy at St John's, St John's Wood, (1964–1967) after which he became first Chaplain and then, from 1970 till 1981, Dean and a fellow at King's College, Cambridge. During this time he was instrumental in the founding of Linkline, the student-run Nightline for the University of Cambridge and Anglia Ruskin University students, including providing the organisation with its first office to operate out of. In 1981 he was appointed Vicar of All Saints', Fulham, and, from 1984, Area Dean of Hammersmith. He was Archdeacon of Canterbury (1986–1996) before his elevation to the Winchester Deanery.

His marriage to Tessa Roskill (1936–2013), daughter of the naval historian Stephen Roskill, took place in 1965 and produced a son and a daughter.

Till retired to Petworth, and died suddenly on 4 December 2012, at the age of 77.

== Notes ==
Church of England titles
Preceded by Trevor Randall Beeson	Dean of Winchester; 1996–2005	Succeeded by James Edgar Atwell
