= John Wickart =

English cleric (died 1722)

John Wickart D.D. (d. 29 January 1722) was a Canon of Windsor from 1684 to 1722 and Dean of Winchester from 1693 to 1722.

== Career ==
He was educated at Clare College, Cambridge, where he graduated MA in 1676, and DD in 1693.

He was appointed:

- Chaplain-in-Ordinary to King James II 1684
- Rector of Hartley, Westpall 1684
- Dean of Winchester 1693–1722

He was appointed to the sixth stall in St George's Chapel, Windsor Castle in 1684 and held this until he died in 1722.

He was buried in the chapel at Windsor on 3 February 1722.
