= Robert Holmes (priest) =

British biblical scholar

Robert Holmes (November 1748 London, England – 12 November 1805 Oxford, England) was an English churchman and academic, Dean of Winchester and a biblical scholar known for textual studies of the Septuagint.

== Life ==
He was baptised at St. Martin's-in-the-Fields, London, on 30 November 1748, the son of Edmund Holmes of that parish. He became a scholar of Winchester College in 1760, and went to New College, Oxford, matriculating on 3 March 1767. He won the chancellor's prize for Latin verse, the subject being 'Ars Pingendi,' in 1769, the year of it institution. He proceeded B.A. in 1770, was elected fellow of his college, and graduated M.A. in 1774, B.D. in 1787, and D.D. in 1789.

He was presented to the college rectory of Stanton St. John, Oxfordshire. His first publication was a sermon preached before the university of Oxford, entitled The Resurrection of the Body deduced from the Resurrection of Christ, 1777 (2nd edit. 1779). In 1778 he published an imitation of Thomas Gray, called Alfred, an Ode. With six Sonnets. In 1782 he was chosen Bampton lecturer, and during the same year published his eight lectures On the Prophecies and Testimony of John the Baptist, and the parallel Prophecies of Jesus Christ. He succeeded John Randolph as Oxford Professor of Poetry in 1783, and composed An Ode for the Encoenia held at Oxford July 1703. In 1788 he issued 'Four Tracts: on the Principles of Religion as a Test of Divine Authority; on the Principles of Redemption; on the Angelical Message to the Virgin Mary; on the Resurrection of the Body; with a Discourse on Humility.'

In 1788 Holmes commenced his collation of the manuscripts of the Septuagint, and published in Latin an account of the method which he thought should be followed. The task, on which he gave annual bulletins, was not finished by the time of his death, but an edition was finally published in five volumes to 1827 by his collaborator James Parsons.

Nor was Holmes a physically indolent man. He was a keen sportsman who, according to Jan Morris, "walking out from college in full canonicals, used to be met by a servant with a hat, a gun and a dog - and throwing off his cassock and surplice, to reveal shooting clothes below, off he would stride to Stanton Woods for an afternoon's sport." When his old New College friend James Woodforde visited him on 18 October 1793 he discovered that "He had gone out a shooting & did not return till five in the Afternoon". Woodforde had found Dr Holmes's wife to be "a very agreeable Woman, and his Sister is very pleasant, exactly like him."

He became prebendary of Lyme and Halstock in Salisbury Cathedral on 23 May 1790, prebendary of Moreton-with-Whaddon in Hereford Cathedral on 12 August 1791, prebendary of the seventh stall in Christ Church, Oxford, on 28 April 1795, and dean of Winchester on 20 February 1804. On 14 December 1797 he was elected Fellow of the Royal Society. He died at his house in St. Giles, Oxford, on 12 November 1805. Most of his treatises and discourses were republished with others in 1806.
