= Fourneaux =

Fourneaux may refer to:

- Fourneaux, Loire, a commune in the Loire département, France
- Fourneaux, Manche, in the Manche département, France
- Fourneaux, Savoie, in the Savoie département, France
- Fourneaux-le-Val, in the Calvados département, France
- Les Fourneaux, a Premier cru vineyard in Chablis, France

== See also ==
- Furneaux (disambiguation)
