= Roger Tonge (priest) =

English clergyman

Roger Tonge (died 1549) otherwise Roger Tong or Tongue was an English clergyman who served as a chaplain to King Edward VI and was later appointed dean of Winchester Cathedral in 1549.

== Biography ==
Tonge was admitted to St John's College, Cambridge as a fellow on Mr. Ashton's foundation in 1534. He received his M.A. in 1537, B.D. in 1543, and D.D. in 1547. Almost nothing is known about his life until 1546, when he is noted as serving as a chaplain to the then Prince Edward. Above all else, Tonge was commended for his able and learned preaching. John Hooker noted that Tonge "had a very sweet voice and an eloquent tongue."

Tonge was a fervent Protestant at an early stage of the English Reformation. For many who had long held strong traditional or Catholic beliefs, the English Reformation was a violent stripping of their way of life. Archbishop Cranmer partly lead the charge of a more stringent form of Protestantism that removed much of the traditional elements of religious life, such as religious images or fasting during Lent. Tonge's sermons on the latter issue proved to be his most influential and controversial. Tonge preached in early 1547 that fasting during Lent was positive, but is not required penitence. This position was the official doctrine as explicated at King Edward's command, but still proved controversial among more conservative clerics. The Bishop of Winchester, Stephen Gardiner, took great offence at Tonge's arguments, and complained to Protector Somerset, the then regent of England, about Tonge's conduct. Years afterwards during the reign of Mary I, a fellow conservative priest, Robert Parkyn, remembered Tonge as a heretic for his preaching.

For his performance and preaching skills, the King granted Tonge the Prebendary of Winchester, underneath Bishop Gardiner. Cranmer again would use Tonge's provocative and passionate preaching in more conservative western country. Tonge was sent to preach in St. Keverne, Cornwall, an area known for more traditional clerics and a recent history of rebellion. Shortly before Tonge's tour in the area, a violent mob murdered the archdeacon of nearby Helston over the destruction of church images. By preaching in these more conservative areas, the Protector and Cranmer were attempting to further their reformation in the farther provinces of England.

Upon returning to Edward's court, Tonge was granted the deanery of Winchester Cathedral for his services. Tonge's tenure was short-lived, as his appointment was in March 1549, and he died in August of the same year. Tonge was buried at St Margaret's, Westminster on 2 September 1549.

Church of England titles
Preceded by William Kingsmill	Dean of Winchester; 1549–1549	Succeeded by John Mason
