= Nicholas Steward (MP for Cambridge University) =

English politician

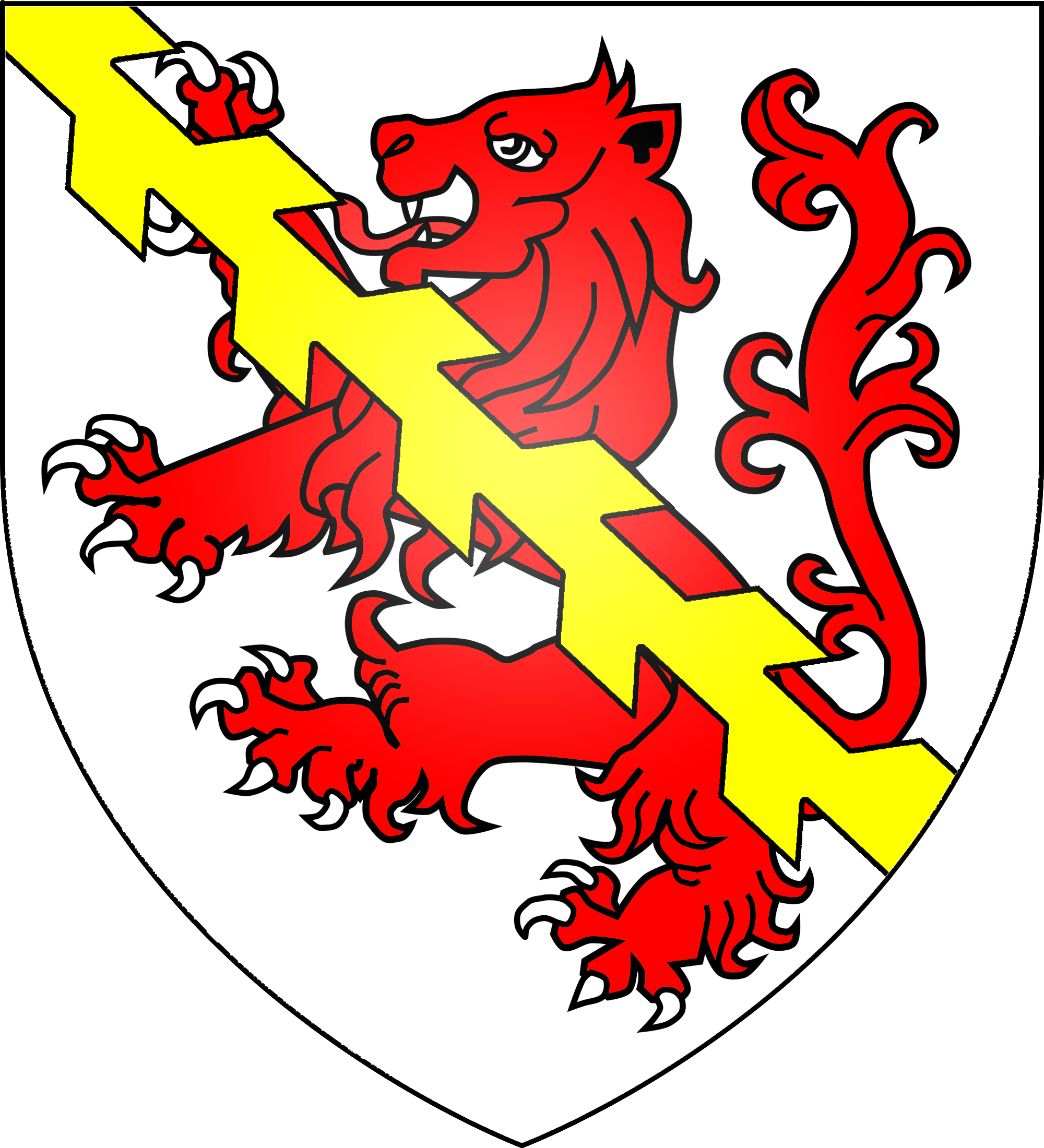
Arms of Steward: Argent, a lion rampant gules debruised by a bend raguly or, said to have been an augmentation of honour granted to an ancestor Sir Alexander Steward "The Fierce" by King Charles VI of France

Nicholas Steward (born 1547, baptized 16 May 1547, died 1 June 1633) of Taplow in Buckinghamshire, later of Hartley Mauditt in Hampshire, was an English politician who sat in the House of Commons in 1604.

== Origins ==
Steward was the seventh son of Simeon Steward of Lakenheath, Suffolk. His eldest brother was Sir Mark Steward (d.1603), MP. The family, formerly known also as "Styward", claimed descent from a younger son of Alexander Stewart, 4th High Steward of Scotland (d. 1283) (from the elder two sons of whom descended the Stuart kings of Scotland and England) as is described on the monument in Ely Cathedral of Sir Mark Steward (d.1603), but which connection has been disproven by modern historians and suspected as a fabrication by his relative Robert Steward (d. 1557), the last Prior of Ely Abbey and the first Dean of Ely Cathedral, "a time-serving prior who assigned generous tracts of dean and chapter lands within the Isle of Ely to numerous relatives".

== Career ==
He matriculated at Trinity College, Cambridge at Easter 1560 and was a student at Trinity Hall, Cambridge in August 1564. He was awarded LL.B. in 1568 and was admitted as an advocate on 29 October 1573. In 1574 he was awarded LL.D. In 1604, Steward was elected as one of the first Members of Parliament for the newly created constituency of Cambridge University. Steward purchased the Manor of Hartley Mauditt, Hampshire, in 1603 from the Lancaster Family.

== Marriage and issue ==
In 1572 he married Frances Baker (d.19 March 1609), a daughter and co-heiress of John Baker of Cambridge, a cousin of Matthew Parker, Archbishop of Canterbury. His grandson was Sir Nicholas Steward, 1st Baronet (1618-1710) "Baronet of Hartley Mauditt", of Pylewell Park in Hampshire, whose descendants adopted the surname "Stuart".

== Death and burial ==
He died in 1633 and was buried in the Church of St Martin-in-the-Fields near Westminster and at his request a monument to him was erected in St. Leonard's Church, Hartley Mauditt.

Parliament of England
New constituency	Member of Parliament for Cambridge University; 1604–1611; With: Henry Mountlow	Succeeded by Sir Miles Sandys; Sir Francis Bacon
