= Charles Naylor (priest) =

18th century Church of England clergyman

Charles Naylor was a Church of England clergyman who served as Dean of Winchester from 1729 to 1739.
