= Robert Horne (bishop) =

English Marian exile and Bishop of Winchester

The Right Reverend Robert Horne
- Bishop of Winchester
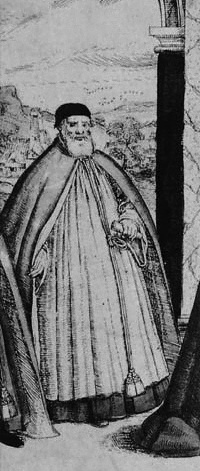
- Engraving of Robert Horne in 1576
- Church: Church of England
- Diocese: Diocese of Winchester
- Installed: 1560
- Term ended: 1579 (death)
- Predecessor: John White
- Successor: John Watson

Orders
- Consecration: 16 February 1561 by Matthew Parker

Personal details
- Born: c 1510 Guildford, County Surrey
- Died: 1579
- Denomination: Anglican
- Occupation: previously Dean of Durham
- Education: St John's College, Cambridge

Robert Horne (1510s – 1579) was an English churchman, and a leading reforming Protestant. One of the Marian exiles, he was subsequently bishop of Winchester from 1560 to 1579.

He was a Fellow of St. John's College, Cambridge in 1537. He was Dean of Durham from 1551 to 1553, and again from 1559 to 1560. During his time as Dean he was responsible for removing ornamentation from Durham Cathedral. He was somewhat isolated.

The death of Dean Whitehead in 1551 had enabled the ultra-Protestant Robert Horne to be appointed to the Deanery, but only one conservative prebendary had died and been replaced during the reign, so Horne had very little support in the Chapter and could achieve only the most superficial conformity, even at the cost of making himself very unpopular. The advent of Mary must have caused huge relief in the close. Horne fled, lamenting the failure of his hopes [...]

In exile, he was at Zurich, Frankfurt and Strasburg. He wrote additional material for a book of homilies by Jean Calvin (1553).

With Thomas Beccon, John Jewel and Edwin Sandys, he was one of the commissioners of 1559, enforcing the Injunctions of Elizabeth I of England from July of that year.

In controversy with John Feckenham, he wrote in 1566 on the issues of medieval church and state relations. He was then attacked by Thomas Stapleton, for his reliance on the history of the Papacy to be found in Bartolomeo Platina.

He was one of the Bishops' Bible translators (1568), responsible for the Book of Isaiah, Book of Jeremiah, and Book of Lamentations.

== Notes ==
Church of England titles
Preceded by John White	Bishop of Winchester; 1560–1580	Succeeded by John Watson
