= John Rastell (Jesuit) =

English Jesuit

John Rastell (1532–1577) was an English Jesuit and controversialist author.

== Life ==
Rastell was born at Gloucester in 1532, was admitted into Winchester School in 1543; and went on to New College, Oxford, of which he became a perpetual fellow in 1549. He graduated M.A. 29 July 1555, and about that time was ordained priest.

Being unable to comply with the religious changes in Elizabeth's reign, Rastell left his college, and went to Louvain. He removed to Antwerp in 1564, and subsequently went to Rome, where he entered the Jesuit novitiate of St. Andrew 6 April 1568, being, for a short time, fellow-novice with St. Stanislas Kostka.

After completing his noviceship, he was English penitentiary for a time at St. Peter's, Rome. He was then sent as confessor and consultor to the house of the Jesuits at Hall.

Rastell was moved to Augsburg, and finally to Ingolstadt, where he was appointed vice-rector of the college of his order. He died in the college on 15 or 17 June 1577.

== Works ==
Rastell was a determined antagonist of Bishop John Jewel, and published the following:

- A Confutation of a Sermon pronounced by M. Iuell, at Paules crosse, the second Sondaie before Easter ... Anno Dñi M.D.L.X., Antwerp (Giles Diest) 21 November 1564, ff. 176. The latter part of the work is entitled 'A Challenge against the Protestants.' The Confutation was responded to in 1579 by William Fulke.
- A Replie against an Answer (falslie intitled) in Defence of the Truth, made by Iohn Rastell: M. of Art and Studient in Diuinite, Antwerp (Giles Diest), 10 March 1565, ff. 205. A response to Thomas Cooper's An Answere in Defence of the Truth.
- A Copie of a Challenge, taken owt of the Confutation of M. Iuells Sermon, Antwerp, 1565.
- A Treatise intitled, Beware of M. Iewell, Antwerp, 1566, in three volumes or parts, the last of which is entitled 'The third Book, declaring by examples out of ancient Councels, Fathers, and later Writers, that it is time to beware of M. Jewel.'
- A Briefe Shew of the false Wares packt together in the named Apology of the Church of England, Louvain (John Fowler), 1567.

A catalogue of 'English Popish Books,' printed by John Strype, includes Rastell's Return of Untruths, which was responded to by Jewel.
