= Thomas Cooper (bishop) =

British bishop (c.1517–1594)

- Bishop of Winchester
- Diocese: Diocese of Winchester
- In office: 1584–1594
- Predecessor: John Watson
- Successor: William Wickham
- Other posts: Dean of Christ Church (1567–1569); Dean of Gloucester (1569–1571); Bishop of Lincoln (1571–1584); Prelate of the Garter (April 1584–1594, ex officio as Bishop of Winchester)

Orders
- Ordination: c. 1559
- Consecration: 24 February 1571 by Matthew Parker

Personal details
- Born: c. 1517 Oxford, Oxfordshire, England
- Died: 29 April 1594 (aged approximately 65–68) Winchester, Hampshire, England
- Denomination: Anglican
- Residence: Buckden, Cambridgeshire (as Bishop of Lincoln)
- Spouse: Amy (m. c. 1546)
- Profession: lexicographer, theologian, writer
- Education: Magdalen College, Oxford

Thomas Cooper (or Couper; c. 1517 – 29 April 1594) was an English bishop, lexicographer, theologian, and writer.

== Life ==
Cooper was born in Oxford, England, where he was educated at Magdalen College. He became Master of Magdalen College School and afterwards practised as a physician in Oxford.

Elizabeth I was greatly pleased with his Thesaurus, generally known as Cooper's Dictionary; and its author, who had been ordained about 1559, was made Dean of Christ Church, in 1567. Two years later, on 27 June 1569, he became Dean of Gloucester; he was elected Bishop of Lincoln on 4 February 1571, consecrated a bishop on 24 February 1571, then translated to Winchester on 12 March 1584.

Cooper was a stout controversialist; he defended the practice and precept of the Church of England against the Roman Catholics on the one hand and against the Martin Marprelate writings and the Puritans on the other. He took some part, the exact extent of which is disputed, in the persecution of religious recusants in his diocese, and died at Winchester on 29 April 1594.

== Works ==
Cooper's literary career began in 1548, when he compiled, or rather edited, Bibliotheca Eliotae, a Latin dictionary by Sir Thomas Elyot. In 1549 he published a continuation of Thomas Lanquet's Chronicle of the World. This work, known as Cooper's Chronicle, covers the period from AD 17 to the time of its writing. Following Robert Crowley's 1559 altered and updated version of the Chronicle which Cooper denounced, he issued an expanded and updated version in 1560 and 1565 that removed or altered most but not all of Crowley's changes and additions. In 1565 appeared the first edition of his greatest work, Thesaurus Linguae Romanae et Britannicae, and this was followed by three other editions.

John Aubrey in "Brief lives", gave the following glimpse into the creation of this dictionary:

Dr. Edward Davenant told me that this learned man had a shrew to his wife, who was irreconcileably angrie with him for sitting-up late at night so, compileing his Dictionarie, (Thesaurus linguae Romanae et Britannicae, Londini, 1584; dedicated to Robert Dudley, earl of Leicester, and Chancellor of Oxford). When he had halfe-donne it, she had the opportunity to gett into his studie, tooke all his paines out in her lap, and threw it into the fire, and burnt it. Well, for all that, that good man had so great a zeale for the advancement of learning, that he began it again, and went through with it to that perfection that he hath left it to us, a most usefull worke.

William Shakespeare is believed to have used Cooper's Thesaurus in the creation of his many poems and plays. (Evidence of this comes from a close statistical inspection of Shakespeare's word usage.)

Cooper's Admonition against Martin Marprelate was reprinted in 1847, and his Answer in Defence of the Truth against the Apology of Private Mass in 1850. (This latter work was answered by the Jesuit controversialist Fr. John Rastell in 1565.)

== Styles and titles ==
- c. 1517–1559: Thomas Cooper Esq.
- 1559–1567: The Reverend Thomas Cooper
- 1567–1571: The Very Reverend Thomas Cooper
- 1571–1594: The Right Reverend Thomas Cooper

Academic offices
Preceded by John Kennall	Vice-Chancellor of Oxford University; 1567–1571	Succeeded by Lawrence Humphrey
Church of England titles
Preceded by Nicholas Bullingham	Bishop of Lincoln; 1571–1584	Succeeded by William Wickham
Preceded by John Watson	Bishop of Winchester; 1584–1594	Succeeded by William Wickham
