= Thomas Lanquet =

English chronicler

Thomas Lanquet (also Lanket or Lanquette) (1521–1545) was an English chronicler.

He studied at Oxford, and devoted himself to historical research. He died in London in 1545 while engaged on a general history; it was a translation of the Chronicle of Johann Carion (1499–1537). Thomas Cooper completed it, and it was published in 1549 by Thomas Berthelet; it is generally known as Cooper's Chronicle, and preserves many curious traditions. Under the year 1552, it is noted that then 'one named Johannes Faustius fyrst founde the craft of printinge, in the citee of Mens in Germanie." Anthony Wood also assigns to Lanquet a Treatise of the Conquest of Bulloigne, but if it was printed it does not seem to have survived.
