= Edmund Steward =

English lawyer and clergyman

Edmund Steward (died 1559) otherwise Stewart or Stewarde was an English lawyer and clergyman who served as Chancellor and later Dean of Winchester Cathedral until his removal in 1559.

== Biography ==
Edmund Steward received his Bachelor of Civil Law in 1515 at Cambridge University. Despite being trained in civil law, Steward went on almost exclusively serve the Church. In 1521 Steward was recorded as serving the Archdeacon of Sudbury as a Commissary. A Commissary represented the authority of the Archdeacon and could exercise ecclesiastical jurisdiction in his name, without taking clerical orders. Steward would go on to be Vicar of Dedham, Essex in 1523, and Rector of Laxfield, Suffolk by 1534. Soon after receiving the Rectory, Steward would become Archdeacon of Suffolk twice between 1524 and 1528. He was first ejected from the position by Thomas Cranmer, then Archbishop of York, in 1526 in favor of Thomas Wynter, a favorite of Cardinal Wolsey. Wynter would transfer to the Archdeaconry of Norwich in 1527, and Steward returned to his position as Archdeacon of Suffolk until his resignation in 1529. At the time of his resignation in early 1529, Steward is a trusted confidant of Bishop Richard Nykke or Norwich, and Nykke states that he "has shown his full mind" to Steward on a few high level political issues. Steward continued to work under Wolsey as a clerk until the latter's death in 1530. Stephen Gardiner was appointed to replace Wolsey as Bishop of Winchester, and Gardiner made Steward his Vicar General and Chancellor in December, 1531. As Gardiner was often abroad or out of his diocese on royal business, Steward ran the diocese in his stead for much of the 1530s.

Steward maintained his position as Chancellor of Winchester for the next decade, corresponding with leading clergymen and politicians like Thomas Cromwell, and gaining several benefices, including the Rectory of Easton, and the Rectory of Wonston. Steward also served directly in matters of state, despite his conservative opinions, as when he was a member of a clerical council debating the merits of translating the Bible into English. At some point in 1541, Steward returned to his studies and received a Doctorate in Civil Law from Cambridge in 1541. Until 1541, Winchester Cathedral was a Priory, but the monastery was dissolved in March 1541. The former Prior, William Kingsmill was appointed Dean, and Steward was first prebendary priest among twelve. By this time, Steward was well ingratiated within the Royal Court, and served as one of King Henry VIII's Chaplains. In 1544, Steward claimed the title of Doctor of Sacred Theology when he loaned the crown £66, along with hundreds of other high clergy in September of that year.

With the death of Henry VIII, the Church of England began a more thorough Reformation or a move away from older traditional practices into a more international Protestant church. Steward remained more attached to the traditional church practices as espoused by Bishop Gardiner, and for that he was stripped of his power and imprisoned in Marshalsea. Steward had refused to recant his statements against the new Articles issued by Lord Protector Northumberland. Steward was released sometime later, and at the ascension of the new Catholic Queen Mary Steward was restored to his chancellorship of Winchester. In less than a year, Steward was promoted to Dean of Winchester, and given a commission as Justice of the Peace for Hampshire.

Steward lived out the next five years peacefully as Dean of Winchester. Queen Mary died in 1558, and with the coronation of her more Protestant sister, Elizabeth, Steward was deprived of his position in 1559. Steward died in August 1559, a few months after his deprivation by Elizabeth.

Church of England titles
Preceded by John Mason	Dean of Winchester; 1554–1559	Succeeded by John Warner
