= William Furneaux =

British headmaster and Dean

The Very Reverend William Mordaunt Furneaux

Dean of Winchester
- In office 1903–1919

Personal details
- Born: 29 July 1848
- Died: 10 April 1928 (aged 79)
- Spouse: Caroline Octavia Mortimer

William Mordaunt Furneaux (29 July 1848 – 10 April 1928) was headmaster of Repton School and Dean of Winchester.

== Family background and childhood ==
Furneaux was born at the Parsonage, Walton D'Eiville, Warwickshire, on 29 July 1848, the eldest son of the Rev. William Duckworth Furneaux and his wife, Louisa (nee Dickins). He was given the middle name "Mordaunt" after Sir Charles Mordaunt, the patron of the living and the owner of the estate where they lived.

William's father belonged to the Furneaux family of Swilly in Devon and had attended Blundell's School, Tiverton, where he won a scholarship to Exeter College, Oxford. At Walton, he tutored wealthy pupils and acted as an examiner at Stratford Grammar School.

William's mother, Louisa, was the daughter of William Dickins of Cherrington, a local squire, magistrate, and deputy lieutenant of the county. Louisa's maternal grandfather was Sir James Allan Park, a judge and legal writer.

In 1860, the family moved to a more valuable living at Berkley, Somerset, where his father continued with his interest in education, acting as diocesan education inspector for the Frome district.

== Scholar at Marlborough and Oxford ==
From April 1861 to May 1868, William attended Marlborough College, where he achieved outstanding success, winning three scholarships (the “Junior,” the “Cotton,” and the “Senior Exhibition”) and almost every prize on offer.

From May 1868 to 1873, he attended Corpus Christi College, Oxford, having won an open scholarship worth £90 to £95, tenable for five years. He made the most of the opportunity, achieving a "double first."

He combined his studies with athletic pursuits, competing in the annual college sports held in February, where he usually came first or second in the high jump, hammer, hurdles, and shot put. From Michaelmas 1870, he took up rowing and, in 1871, only narrowly missed selection for the boat race against Cambridge.

== Master at Clifton and Marlborough ==
On leaving Oxford, he spent a short time as an assistant master at Clifton College before, in December 1873, joining Marlborough College as a sixth-form teacher. As the position required him to take Holy Orders, he was ordained deacon in December 1874 and priest one year later.

On 11 April 1877, at Preshute Church, William married Caroline Octavia Mortimer, the youngest daughter of the late Joseph Mortimer, a member of a prosperous cloth-making family who, after failing in business himself, lived a life of genteel leisure in the fashionable resort of Weymouth. Since his death in 1861, she had enjoyed financial independence, living with relatives at Puddletown and elsewhere. They had three daughters over the next four years: Dorothy, Marjorie, and Edith.

== Headmaster of Repton ==
From January 1883 to July 1900. Furneaux served as Headmaster of Repton School, Derbyshire, where he instigated substantial changes to enlarge the school, raise standards, and update the curriculum.

As a teacher, he was at his best with sixth-form boys, many of whom found his lessons inspiring. He shared with them his love of poetry and taught them critical approaches to Bible study.

In May 1891, he was made an honorary canon of Southwell Cathedral, just in time for the Queen’s state visit to Derby, where he presented her with a ceremonial address. In 1892, he was a Select Preacher at Cambridge.

By the late 1890's, he had lost some of his earlier enthusiasm. At the beginning of 1900, after breaking his ankle while skating in Switzerland, he was forced to take a month off, which gave him time for reflection. By 7 March 1900, he had decided to resign as on that day, he bought a large house in Winchester called the Friary. In July, he left the school.

== Dean of Winchester ==
The Friary was a substantial residence in the heart of the city, with fine views of the Cathedral and the College. Its location suggests that Furneaux was ambitious to advance his career.

His first few years at Winchester were quiet. He and his family participated in the city’s social life, and he took on a light workload, becoming examining chaplain for Southwell in September 1900 and for Winchester in June 1901.

Then, early in 1903, his life changed dramatically. The Cathedral Chapter needed to urgently appoint a new Dean before they could appoint a new Bishop. As Furneaux was the right man on the spot, the Church authorities expedited his appointment. On 24 March 1903, the Vice-Dean installed Furneaux as Dean of Winchester.

Tragedy struck one year later when, on 30 April 1904, Furneaux’s wife died after undergoing surgery for an internal complaint. Her funeral was held at the Cathedral four days later.

The period from 1905 to 1912 was the most significant in Furneaux’s life. In the spring of 1905, the diocesan architect identified that the Cathedral was at risk of collapse and that urgent underpinning was required to save it. Ideally suited to lead the project, Furneaux played a crucial role in organising the work and raising the necessary money, which amounted to £120,000.

By January 1911, the work was almost complete, and on St Swithin’s Day, 1912, a thanksgiving service celebrated the Cathedral's preservation.

== Retirement, death, and memorials ==
In August 1919, Furneaux resigned and went to live at New Milton, where he often helped in the local church.

He died at the White Cottage, New Milton, on 10 April 1928, aged 79, and his ashes were placed in his wife's grave three days later. He left net unsettled property of £34,350.

In 1930, the Bishop of Winchester unveiled a pair of memorial gates to the Dean. Repton School chapel also has a memorial to him.

== Publications ==
- A Companion to the Public School Hymn Book (1904)
- A Declaration on Biblical Criticism by 1725 Clergy of the Anglican Communion with an explanatory letter by the Dean of Winchester (W. M. Furneaux), ed. by H. Handley (1906)
- The Acts of the Apostles: A Commentary for English Readers (Oxford: Clarendon Press, 1912)
- The Book of Psalms; a revised version (1923)
- Introduction to the Lessons of the Lectionary (Winchester: new edition, 1924)

== Notes ==
Church of England titles
Preceded by William Richard Wood Stephens	Dean of Winchester; 1903 – 1919	Succeeded by William Holden Hutton
Academic offices
Preceded by Henry Robert Huckin	Headmaster of Repton School; 1883-1900	Succeeded by Hubert Burge
