= Francis Newton (priest) =

English clergyman

Francis Newton (died 1572) was an English clergyman who served as Dean of the Winchester Cathedral from 1565 until his death in 1572.

== Biography ==
Francis Newton was born to Sir John Newton of Cradock, Gloucestershire (d. 1568) and his wife Margaret. John Newton and Margaret had twenty children together, though not many grew into adulthood. Francis Newton attended Michaelhouse, Cambridge and received his B.A in 1549, and M.A. in 1553. After receiving his M.A., Newton was elected as a fellow at Trinity College, and served until 1555 when he served as a fellow at Jesus College.

In 1555 Queen Mary required all clergy at Cambridge to subscribe to orthodox Catholic doctrine or face expulsion. Newton complied, though his brother Theodore Newton, also a priest, refused. Theodore fled England and entered John Knox's congregation in Geneva. Francis Newton remained behind in England, and despite his subscription to the Catholic articles, he was removed from his fellowship at Jesus College.

After the ascension of Queen Elizabeth, Newton was restored to some clerical authority. Elizabeth appointed him prebendary of North Newbald in 1559, and Newton was installed in April 1560. After, Newton returned as a fellow to Trinity and received his D.D. in 1563. The Master of Trinity College, Robert Beaumont recommended Newton to Elizabeth as a potential new head of Jesus College, but nothing came of the suggestion. Later, in 1564, Elizabeth visited Trinity, and Newton was presented to her with other Doctors of Divinity to dispute on whether a civil magistrate has authority in ecclesiastical matters. Newton's position on the question was not recorded, but he left an impression on the Royal visitor. Less than a year later, Elizabeth appointed Newton as the Dean of Winchester on 12 May 1565. Elizabeth may have remembered Francis Newton years later in 1569, when she recommended he replace the recently deceased prebend of Canterbury Cathedral, named Theodore Newton. Theodore had been installed as prebend in October 1559, and ordained by Bishop Grindal three months later. He died peacefully in 1569, though he was not succeeded by his brother as Archbishop Parker had already filled the vacancy.

Francis Newton lived out his remaining years at Winchester peacefully. He died in November 1572, when his brother Henry was given control of his estate.
