= Dean of Winchester =

Church of England senior clergy member

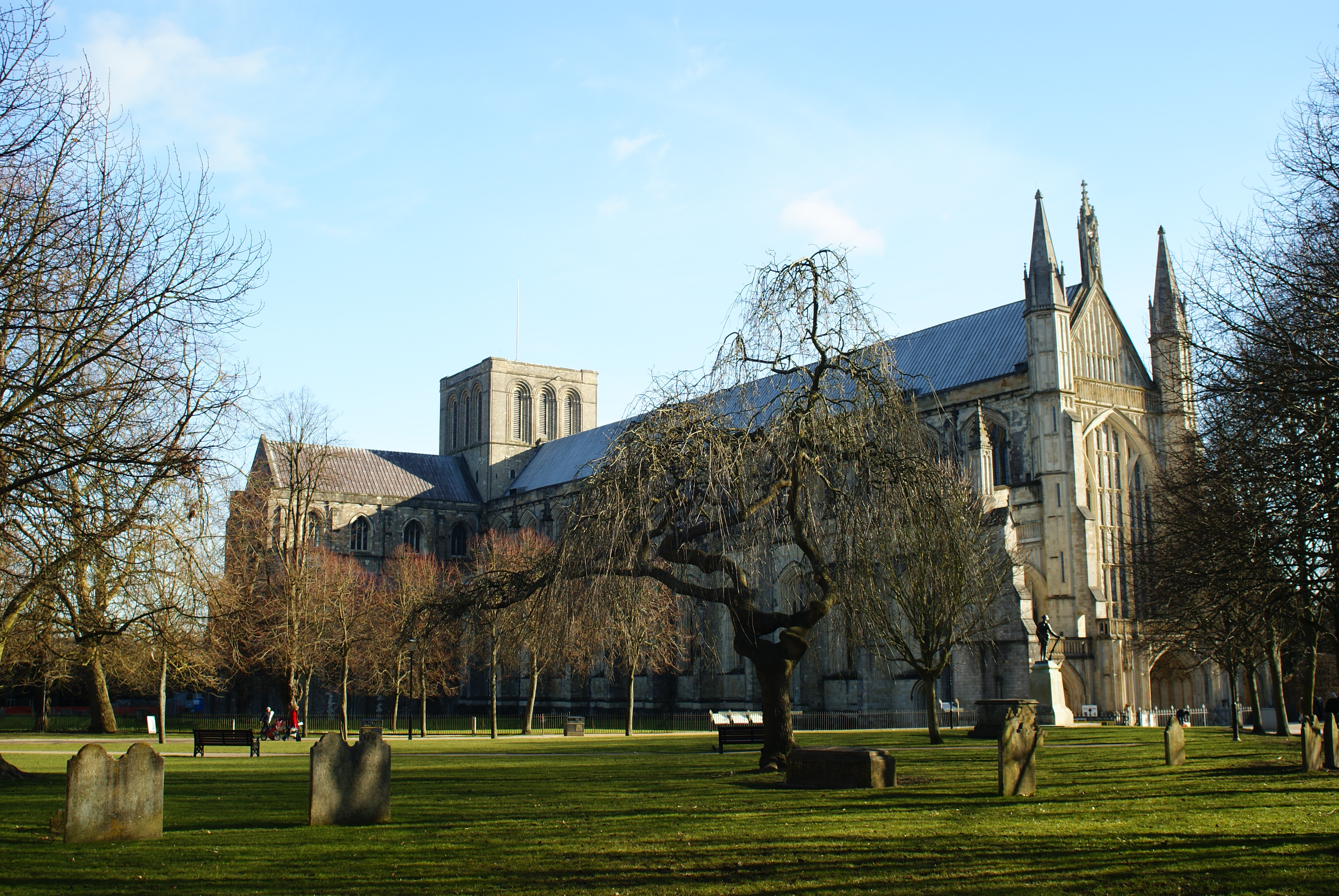
Winchester Cathedral

The Dean of Winchester is the head of the Chapter of Winchester Cathedral in the city of Winchester, England, in the Diocese of Winchester. Appointment is by the Crown. The first incumbent was the last Prior, William Kingsmill, From March 2025 the vice-dean of the cathedral, The Reverend Canon Dr Roland Riem, has served as interim dean of Winchester Cathedral. Reverend Canon Christopher Palmer will be installed as new dean 15 March 2026.

== List of deans ==
=== Early modern ===
- 1541–1549 William Kingsmill
- 1549 Roger Tonge
- 1549–1554 John Mason (layman)
- 1554–1559 Edmund Steward
- 1559–1565 John Warner
- 1565–1572 Francis Newton
- 1573–1580 John Watson
- 1580–1589 Lawrence Humphrey
- 1589–1600 Martin Heton
- 1600–1609 George Abbot
- 1609–1616 Thomas Morton
- 1616–1645 John Young
- 1660–1665 Alexander Hyde
- 1666–1679 William Clarke
- 1679–1692 Richard Meggot
- 1692–1722 John Wickart
- 1722–1729 William Trimnel
- 1729–1739 Charles Naylor
- 1739–1748 Zachary Pearce
- 1748–1760 Thomas Cheyney
- 1760–1769 Jonathan Shipley
- 1769–1804 Newton Ogle

=== Late modern ===
- 1804–1805 Robert Holmes
- 1805–1840 Thomas Rennell
- 1840–1872 Thomas Garnier
- 1872–1883 John Bramston
- 1883–1894 George Kitchin
- 1894–1902 William Stephens
- 1903–1919 William Furneaux
- 1919–1930 Holden Hutton
- 1931–1958 Gordon Selwyn
- 1958–1961 Norman Sykes
- 1961–1969 Oswin Gibbs-Smith
- 1969–1986 Michael Stancliffe
- 1987–1996 Trevor Beeson
- 1996–2005 Michael Till
- 2006–2016 James Atwell
- 2017–2025 Catherine Ogle
- 2025–2026 Roland Riem (interim dean)
- 2026 – Christopher Palmer
