= William Kingsmill (priest) =

Dean of Winchester

William Kingsmill alias William Basyng (?–1549) was Prior of St. Swithun's Priory, Winchester until the Dissolution of the Monastery in 1539; it was a Benedictine monastic house and its shrine to the saint popularly associated with determining the entire period of pre-harvest weather was a place of pilgrimage. He was appointed as the first Dean of Winchester Cathedral at the foundation of the new chapter in 1541.

== Biography ==
William Kingsmill was professed to the Rule of Saint Benedict at St. Swithun's Priory (Winchester Cathedral) in 1513. Upon joining the Benedictine Monastery he took on the name of his home town Basyng and was known as William Basyng until 1540. During his time as a monk, Basyng obtained several secular appointments. Bishop Foxe of Winchester ordained Basyng as a Deacon in 1521. Two years later, Basyng was fully ordained as a priest. During his time as a monk, Basyng studied logic, philosophy and theology, and was granted the degree of Bachelor of Theology by University of Oxford on 1 June 1526. Over the next three years, Basyng participated in four public disputations on theology, and received his licence to preach in January 1529. His final disputation was presented on 4 February, and he received his Doctorate in Theology on 15 March 1529.

Basyng became a leader within the priory due to his education and experience with the outside world as a secular cleric. In 1529, when Henry VIII summoned the Reformation Parliament, he also summoned a meeting of Bishops, Deans, Priors and leading monks and clergy to a Convocation of Canterbury. Basyng was summoned as a representative for St. Swithun's, along with his prior, Henry Broke. Basyng may not have attended, though Prior Broke seems to have been present. As a lesser clergyman, Basyng's selection to the Convocation singled him out for future promotion, such as then Archdeacons Stephen Gardiner and Thomas Cranmer.

Over the next six years, Basing rose within the ranks of the Priory to the position of "Hordarius et Coquinarius" meaning in charge of the kitchens, and over the non-sacred property of the monastery. When Henry VIII commissioned an evaluation of all the property held by the monastery in 1535, Basyng controlled the largest amount of wealth, second only to the Prior. Though Basyng was not the subprior, he was still controlled enough respect at the monastery, and enough political power outside St. Swithun's to be a viable candidate for the next prior. Prior Broke had served as subprior for almost ten years before his election for Prior in 1524. Broke had served with little to no complaint during his tenure, but with the legal and religious changes of the 1530s, his conservative position on church doctrine made him a target for reformers.

Sometime after the valuation of St. Swithun's, a scholar and monk named Richard Mylls brought Prior Broke to the attention of Thomas Cromwell. Cromwell was battling the Bishop of Winchester, Stephen Gardiner for political power in the diocese, while also trying to place proponents of the Royal Supremacy and further reforms against Catholic traditions, such as the removal of relics. A monk named Richard Mylls sent a protest to Cromwell that Broke had forbidden him to study at Oxford because Mylls had spoken out against the veneration of saints, pilgrimages, and the Rule of Saint Benedict. On 14 March 1536 a certain Thomas Parry (a servant of Cromwell, writing to Thomas Cromwell accused the prior, along with "four or five other monks" of stealing "divers precious stones" and selling them to "one Bestyan a jeweller " of London. He went on to say that he believed Broke has visited "divers religious houses for a like purpose". On 16 March, Parry advised Cromwell that, faced with these accusations, Henry Broke had resigned. He then recommended William Basyng for the post stating that Basyng was "a man of learning and a favourer of the truth", Basyng, he wrote, "will give [Cromwell] £500 for the "favour herein". The cathedral registers do not provided an account of Basyng's installation as Prior but on 27 March he "compounded an agreement" to pay the Crown the tax known as the First Fruits (a substantial portion of his annual income).

At this point Basyng discovered that he could not afford the £500. On 31 March 1536 he wrote to Thomas Cromwell informing him he was unable to pay the £500 because "my predecessor has left me in debt to the King and others" and he promised to pay the remainder in installments which he did over the next several years. By the end of 1539 he had paid Cromwell a total of £450 just six months before Cromwell's execution.

A few months after his appointment as Prior Basyng received orders from the Lord Privy Seal (Cromwell) to send 50 men to Ampthill in Bedfordshire to support the King against the Northern Rebellion in Lincolnshire. Elsewhere, within the same reference, are listed "The names of persons who are to supply men against the northern rebellion", and the number for Winchester is 200. Five days later the orders were countermanded and the force was to "return home and to keep watch and apprehend seditious persons and strong vagabonds who may be scattered abroad by the defeat of the rebels"

Cromwell's evaluation of the wealth of the Church was corrected and amended in 1536.(Broke is referred to as the former Prior). It shows the annual income of Basyng to be £1592 3s 7d. This compares with that of Bishop Stephen Gardiner at £3885 3s 4d and that of the rector of the nearby church of St. Maurice at £6 7s 6d.

By 1538, Cromwell and King Henry were promoting Protestant theological ideas beyond the political break with Rome. Cromwell commanded new visitations to the monasteries charged with removing shrines, and other religious images. St. Swithun's was home to the shrine and relics of St. Swithun, a popular site of pilgrimage among local English and French. The visitors led by Richard Pollard and Thomas Wriothesely came to St. Swithun's in September 1538 to destroy the shrine, to destroy the relics of Saint Swithun and to seize the wealth of the cathedral for the Crown. Pollard, only two weeks previously, had destroyed the shrine of Thomas à Becket at Canterbury cathedral and seized huge amounts of gold, jewels and silver. Pollard and Wriothesely completed the destruction of the St. Swithun's shrine on 21 September 1538. Having completed their work they sat down within the cathedral (there is a note to this effect) and wrote their report to Thomas Cromwell. They advised that they had completed their work at 3 o'clock in the morning. They went on to advise that "There was no gold, nor ring, nor true stone ... but all great counterfeits; but all the silver alone will amount to 2000 mks. Have also received the cross of emeralds, the cross called Jerusalem, another gold cross, two gold chalices and other plate. the prior and chapter were conformable. The mayor with eight or nine of his bretheren, the bishop's chancellor ... assisted and praised the king therefor ..." There is no reference to the bones of St. Swithun but Pollard and Wriothesely advise that they intend to move on to Hyde Abbey and to St. Mary's Abbey (Nunnaminster) to "sweep away all the rotten bones that be called relics ... lest it be thought we came more for the treasure than for avoiding the abomination that be called idolatry. The yield must have been a considerable disappointment after Canterbury.

They also reported that there was nothing worth taking from the Prior's treasury because "the old prior had so diminished the plate ..."

However, in due course, they found their way to the Bishop's treasury where they drew up an inventory of the cathedral's wealth and here they were well rewarded. Their inventory included, "5 gold crosses garnished with precious stones ... a "scryne" of gold plate garnished with precious stones ... 3 gold chalices ...4 gold pontifical rings garnished with precious stone ...a book of the 4 evangelists, written with gold and the outer sides of plates of gold" and much much more gold and silver besides. The bishop, Stephen Gardiner, was not present during these depredations, he was returning from an unsuccessful diplomatic mission in France. Almost a week later Wriothesely met him in Kent and this is how he reported his encounter. The bishop "did not seem to dislike the doing at Canterbury and wished the like had been done at Winchester." Clearly, Gardiner had not received news of the Winchester depredations and was in no position to voice opposition to them.

A year later, on 14 November 1539, Basyng surrendered the priory to King Henry, and the church was converted into a 'new college' and Basyng was appointed guardian. Pensions were to be paid to "1 guardian, 12 seniors, 12 commoners, 4 priests, 4 singing men ... 8 choristers, 4 bellringers. Wages and liveries for 19 officers of the household, 12 servants assigned to the guardian and liveries to the extent of £20 yearly at the guardian's discretion; also 4 servants assigned to the seniors ... Total pensions and wages £528 13s 4d. Further allowances for diets, £316 8s; alms £29 15s 5d and pensions to four late religious despatched, £12 13s 4d". At the surrender of the monastery, Basyng dropped his monastic name in favour of his family name, Kyngesmill (Kingsmill). Kingsmill's pension is recorded elsewhere at £200 a year. All the income of the monastery was preserved except £30 3s 4d which "remaineth clear to the use of the King's Majesty".

On 22 March 1541 the "late monastery of St. Swithin, Winchester" was reconstituted by means of a charter as a Cathedral with one Dean ("Will. Kyngesmill, S.T.P.) and 12 "priests prebendaries" (all named). "The said dean and prebendaries to be known as the dean and chapter."

On 1 May 1541, Henry returned most of the lands and rents back to the Cathedral, now known as the Cathedral Church of the Holy Trinity. In addition he granted to the Cathedral a number of Rectories formerly in the possession of Hyde Abbey, Southwick Priory, Llanthony Priory (Gloucestershire), Amesbury Priory and Christchurch Twynham Priory. Kingsmill's loyalty to the crown and his control over much of the diocese's wealth aided him in gaining new benefices and appointments. In 1542, Kingsmill became the vicar of Overton, Hampshire, which he held without complaint until his resignation in 1545. At the time of his resignation as vicar, he held the Rectories of Aldershot, St. Peter's, Wiltshire, Alverstoke, and Colemore. In October 1544, when Kingsmill received a dispensation to hold multiple benefices, he was listed as one of the King's Chaplains. Many would have envied Kingsmill's period in office both as Prior and later as Dean.

He drew up his will in August 1548 and died in early 1549. His executors drew up an inventory of his personal possessions which were held in the Priory, at the Tabard Inn in Southwark and at private lodgings elsewhere. The chief executor and beneficiary was his mother who lived at Chilcombe in Dorset. His private lodgings at the Tabard Inn comprised eight chambers including two bedchambers, his own kitchen and his own chapel. The inventory has been written about extensively being of much interest to social historians.

== Notes ==
Church of England titles
Preceded by Inaugural appointment	Dean of Winchester; 1541–1549	Succeeded by Roger Tonge
