= Thomas Beccon =

16th c English reformer, Canon & Six Preacher of Canterbury

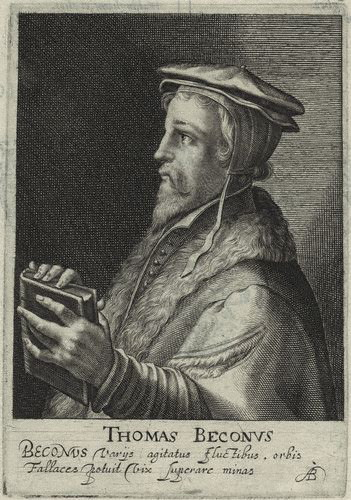
Thomas Beccon

Thomas Beccon or Becon (c. 1511–1567) was an English cleric and Protestant reformer from Norfolk.

== Life ==
Beccon was born c.1511 in Norfolk, England. He entered the University of Cambridge in March 1526-27, probably St John's College. He studied under Hugh Latimer and was ordained in 1533. In 1532 he was admitted a member of the community of the College of St. John the Evangelist, Rushworth - now Rushford.

He was arrested for Protestant preaching and was forced to recant around 1540. He then began to write under the pen name of Theodore Basille. When Edward VI came to the throne in 1547, Beccon was made chaplain to the Lord Protector. He was also presented by the Worshipful Company of Grocers to the living of St Stephen's, Walbrook in the City of London. Thomas Cranmer made him one of the Six Preachers of Canterbury, and a chaplain in Cranmer's own household. He contributed to Cranmer's Homilies.

When Mary I came to the throne in 1553, as a married priest, Beccon was divested of his ecclesiastical positions. In August that year he was designated a seditious preacher and imprisoned in the Tower of London. He was released in March the following year and fled the country. He went to Strasbourg and then to Frankfurt, and he taught at Marburg University around 1556–1559. When Elizabeth I came to power, he returned to England and was made a canon of the Canterbury Cathedral in 1559. In 1560 he was successfully nominated to Christ Church Newgate and in 1563 to St Dionis Backchurch, both in the City of London.

== Works ==
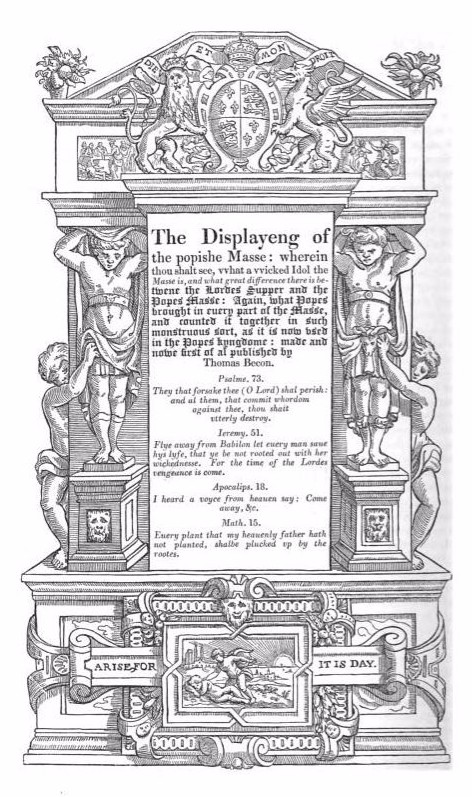
Illustration from the 1844 edition of Becon's works

Beccon's writings were initially Lutheran. They became increasingly harsh and Zwinglian with time. In 1559 he wrote The Displaying of the Popish Mass.

The following text is taken from an article by Alexander Balloch Grosart in the DNB (1885-1900), now in the public domain:

"A collected edition of his works, including many unpublished, appeared in 3 vols. folio in 1563-4. In the 'Athenæ Cantabrigienses' (i. 247-9) will be found a full catalogue of the many writings of Becon, to the number of forty-seven. The Rev. John Ayre, M.A., has edited the works of Becon for the Parker Society, and has brought together all that has been transmitted. His 'Biographical Notice' before 'The Early Works' (1843), with its authorities and references, must be the main source of every succeeding biographer and historian. The Religious Tract Society and others still circulate 'Selections' from his works."

== Family ==
He married Elizabeth, daughter of William Godfrey of Winchester. They had three children that survived past infancy. Theodore, his eldest surviving son became a physician in Canterbury. Basil Becon followed his father into the Church and held several livings in Kent. His daughter Rachel married William Beswicke of Horsmanden who served as High Sheriff of Kent in 1616.
