= Brian Whelan =

Irish painter, author and playwright (born 1957)

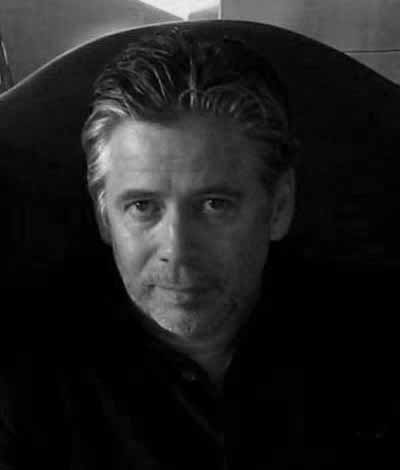
- Brian Whelan, 2009
- Born: 3 May 1957 (age 69); Ealing, London
- Website: brianwhelanart.com

Brian Whelan (born 3 May 1957) is a British-born Irish painter, author and playwright.

== Early life ==
Whelan was born in Ealing, West London, UK, to Irish Roman Catholic parents. His childhood was spent both in London and Ireland (Kilkenny, Waterford and Dublin). After his training at Kingston Polytechnic College and the Royal Academy of Arts, he lived and worked for 30 years in various parts of Norfolk and Suffolk, England. These early years were spent painting, organizing various multi-disciplined art events and making films.

== Career ==
Whelan first came to the attention of the public and media in a fringe event connected to the Aldeburgh Festival in 2000 with an exhibition entitled "The Church Pub" with co artist Andrew Smith. Whelan's half of the exhibition went on to the Hammersmith Irish Art Centre in London (now called the Irish Cultural Centre). Over the next two years (2001-2), the exhibition was held at several other London venues including: St Benedict's Abbey in Ealing, Spotlight and Broadway Galleries in Lewisham, and Irish Club in Eaton Square. John Hegarty of the Montfort Brothers of St. Gabriel commissioned Whelan to paint a portrait of their spiritual founder, Louis de Montfort. The painting is permanently hung at the Montfort Missionaries in Czestochowa, Poland.

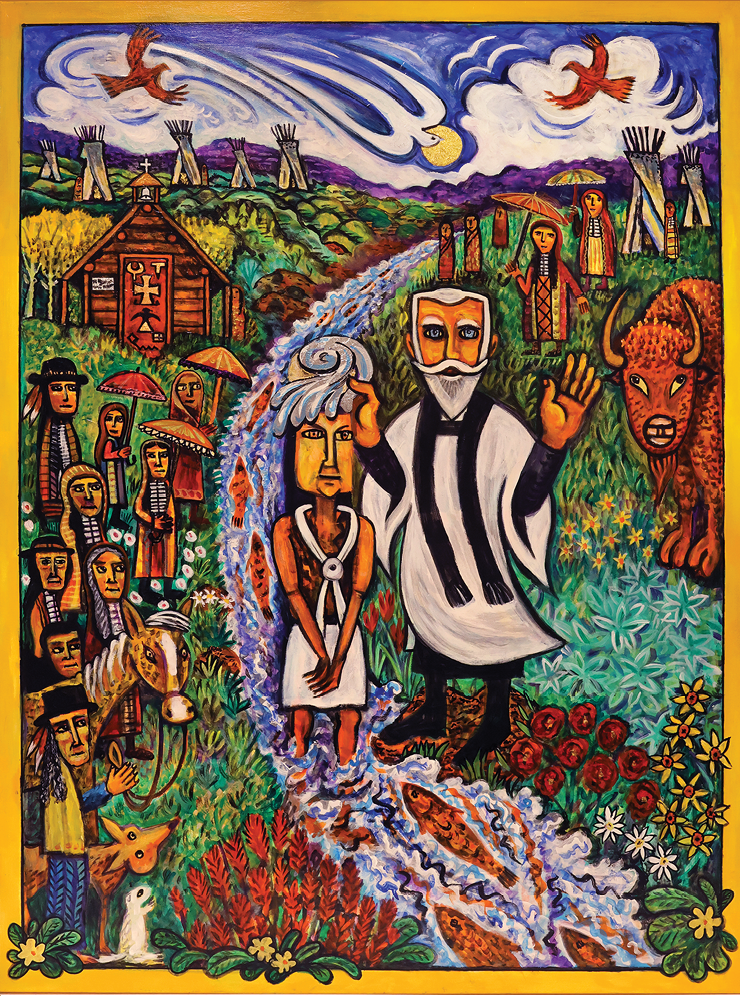
“Servant of God” by Brian Whelan, one of thirteen paintings on the life of Rev. Dr. John Roberts, 2022/2023

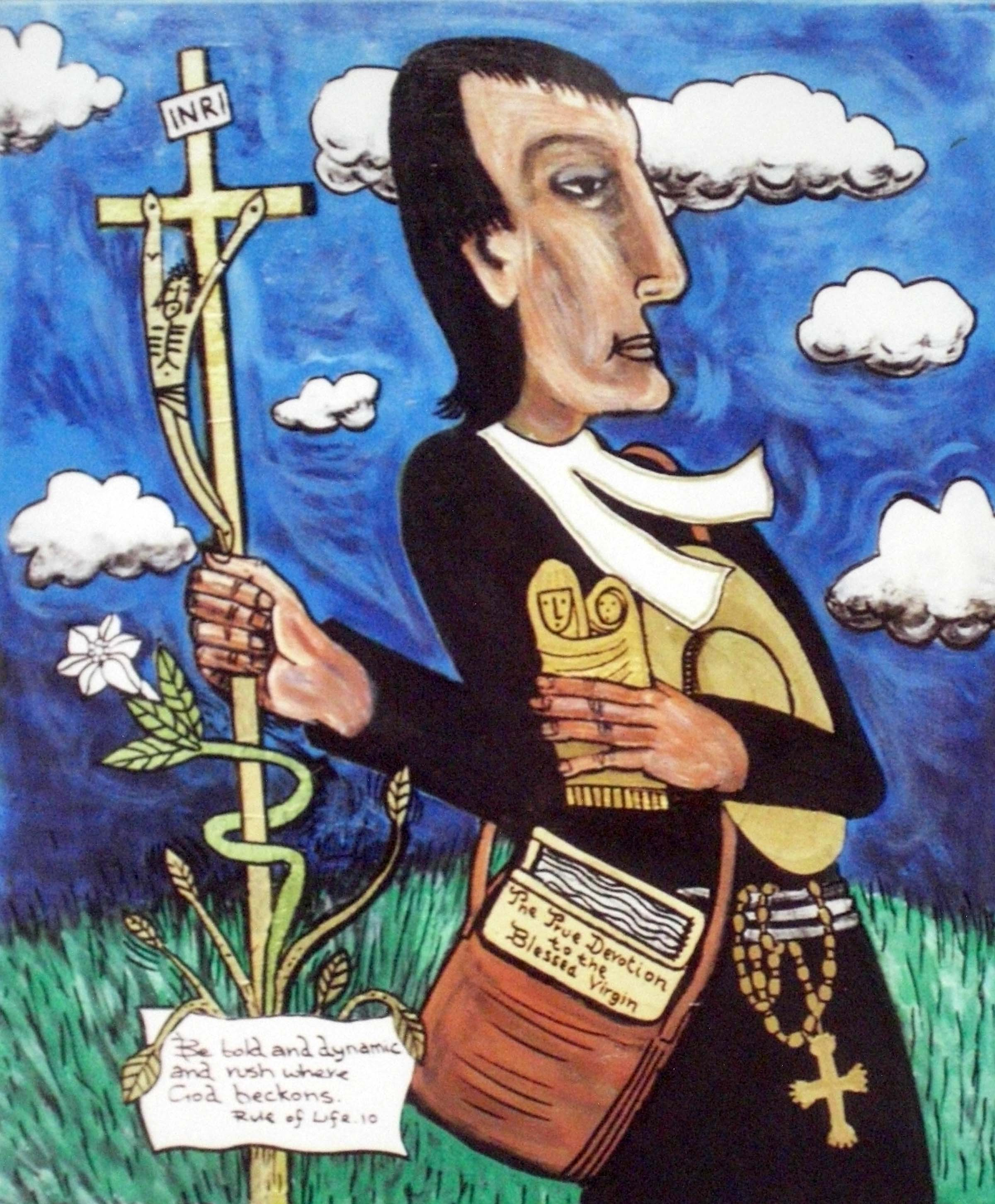
Louis de Montfort (24" x 20"), painted by artist Brian Whelan c. 2003

Later years in England were devoted to exhibiting his works throughout England (St Edmundsbury Cathedral, Norwich Cathedral, St Benedict's Abbey) and internationally (Spain, China, United States) and writing books.

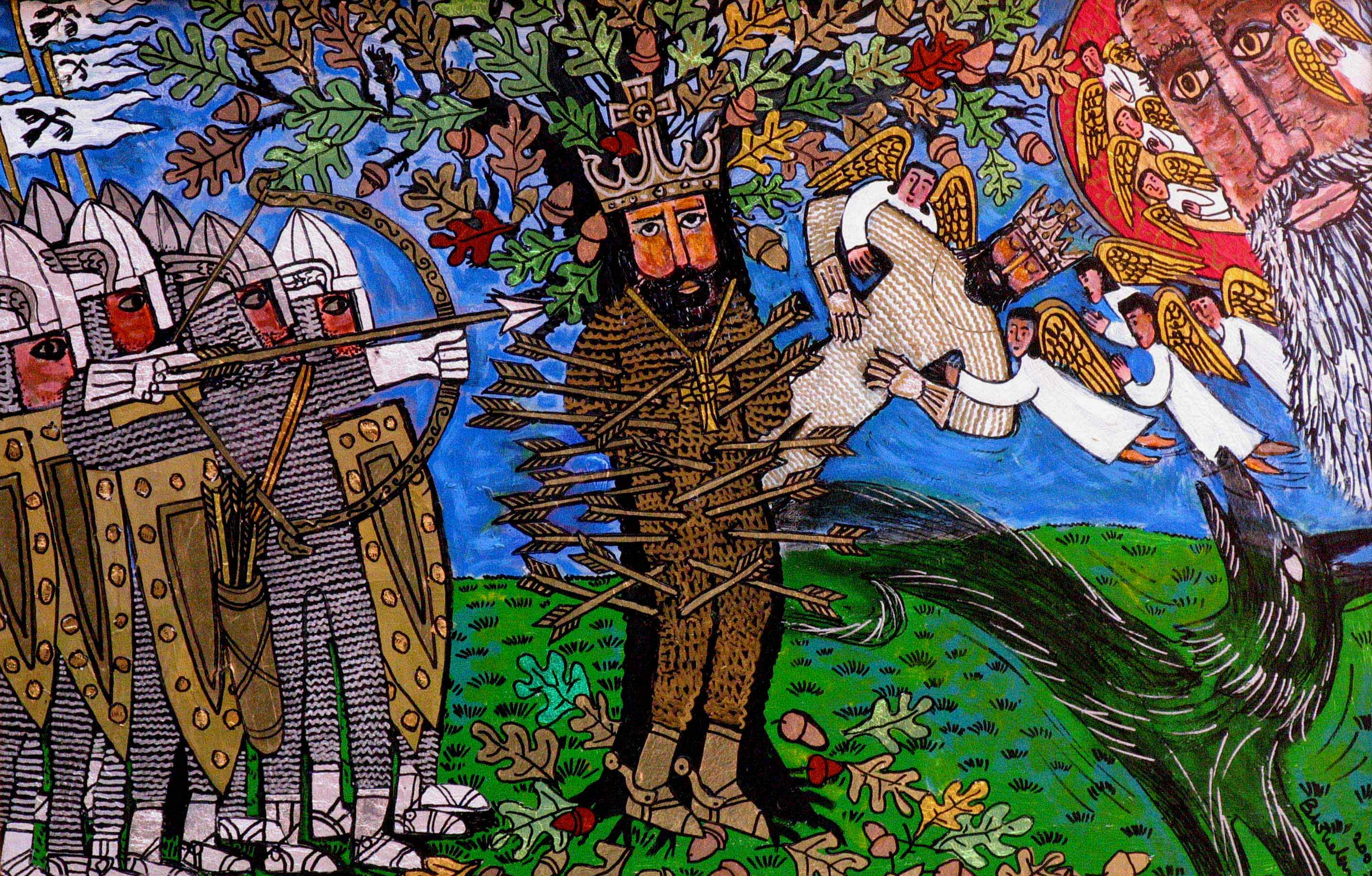
The Martyrdom of St Edmund by Brian Whelan

From 2013 to 2019, he and his American wife Wendy Roseberry had lived in the historic village of Waterford, Virginia, US, where they had created a studio out of an old outbuilding.

Since 2020, they have lived in Connecticut, US. The studio is in a former horse stable.

== Works and exhibitions ==
In 2026, the National Portrait Gallery, London acquired for its permanent collection, Whelan's portrait painting of the late London Irish singer songwriter, Shane MacGowan.

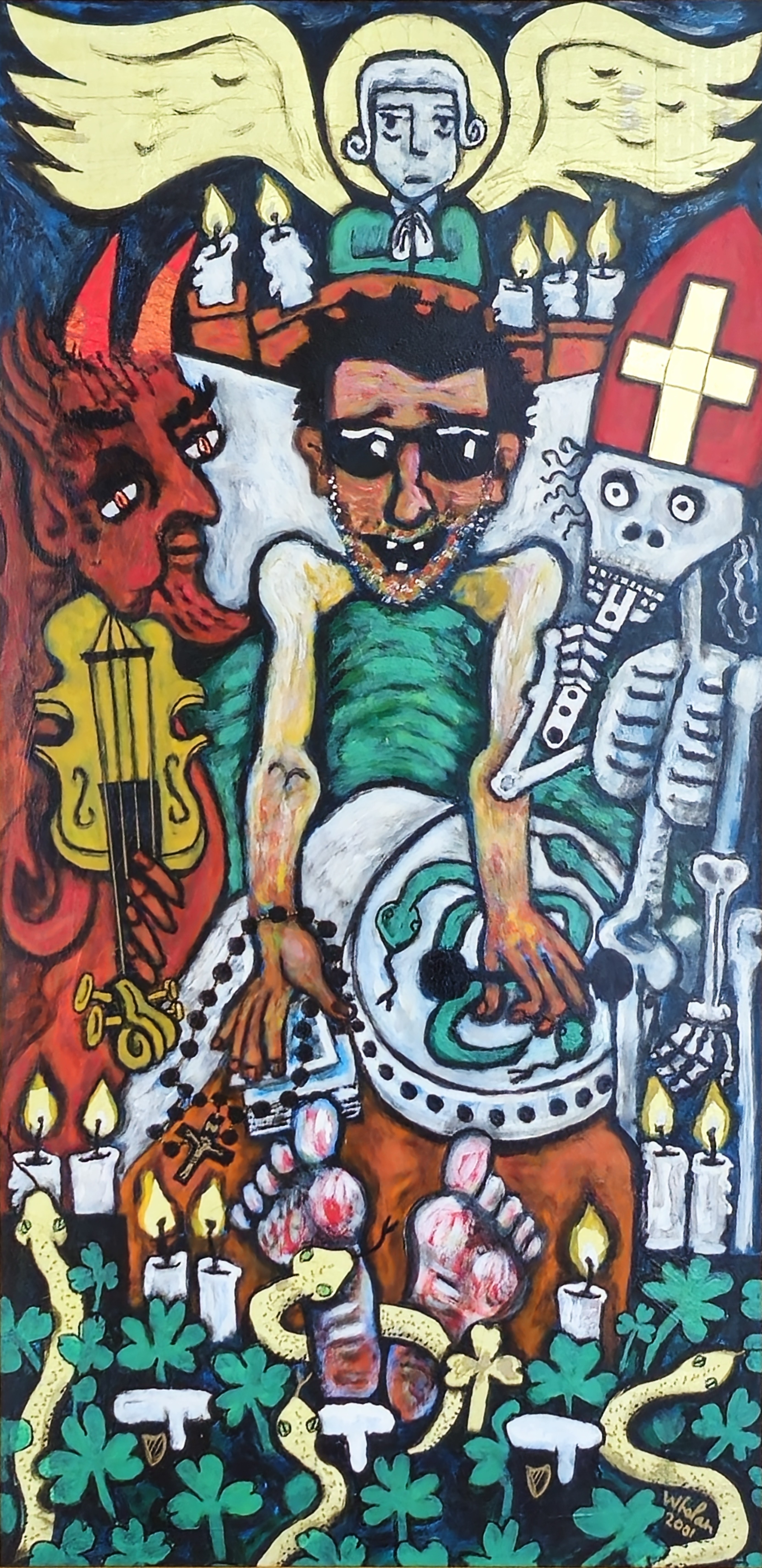
'Shane MacGown - Boy From the County Hell' painting acquired by National Portrait Gallery, London in 2026.

An international exhibition Noah - A Future Hope of Whelan's paintings on Noah opens in Houstan, Texas, visits Washington DC, Hartford, Connecticut, NYC and finishs its US tour in Minneapolis, MN. European sites will be visited by the exhibition in 2027.

In 2024–25, Whelan continues a US tour of his solo show of the large nontych 'Holy City' at Trinity Church Wall Street in NYC.

He will also be one of three artists in an international tour,'Noah, a Future Hope'.

Whelan's John Roberts commission for the Episcopal Church of Wyoming is first unveiled at the John Roberts Festival on June 3, 2023. From there the 13 paintings embark on an international tour.

The year 2021 included exhibitions at the Silvermine Art Center and Westport River Gallery in Connecticut and The Paula Friedman Art Gallery and Verostko Center in Pennsylvania. Pauly Friedman Art Gallery - Misericordia University. Whelan joined fellow London Royal Academy of Art alumni in the 'Legacy' exhibition held at the Minories Galleries in Colchester, England, UK in 2019.

In 2018, the Green Curtain Theatre Company staged in London, Whelan's play "A Tragic Carmody" based on his experience with the late artist Daniel Carmody. Also in 2018, art collector John Kohan profiled Whelan and Whelan's works that Kohan has purchased for his religious art collection.

Washington National Cathedral invited Whelan to again exhibit in 2016. Nine paintings on the subject of Holy City, a celebration of the three Abrahamic faiths: Judaism, Christianity and Islam. The installation placed in the north transept was to mark the 15th year since the 9/11 attacks.

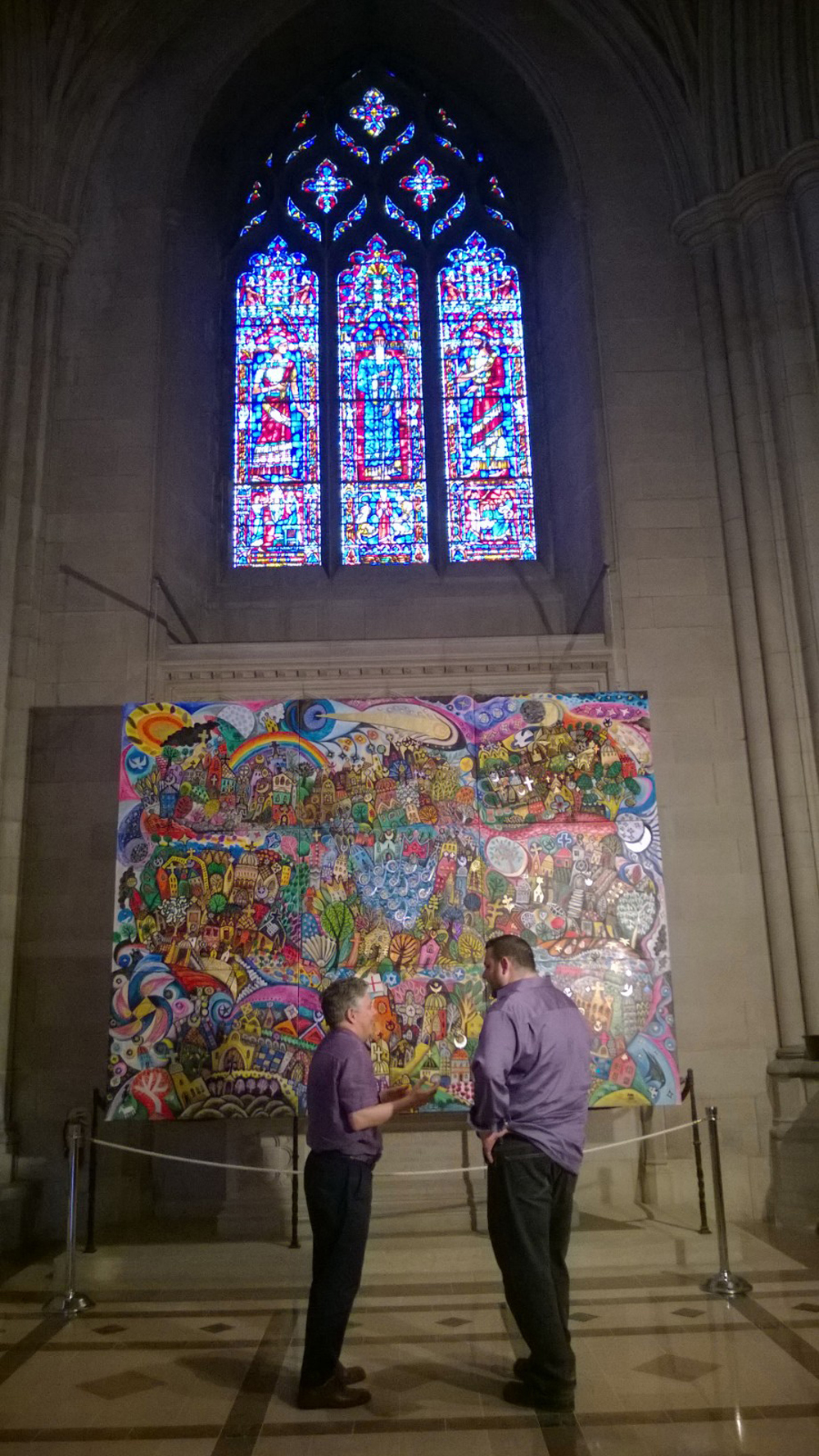
Holy City - Washington National Cathedral Aug 2016

Norwich Cathedral in Norfolk England commissioned Whelan to paint 14 panels of the spiritual life and death of International Red Cross nurse Edith Cavell in 2014. The panels on which the scenes of The Passion of Edith Cavell were painted, were first exhibited at Washington National Cathedral in the US to mark 100 years since the beginning of WW1.

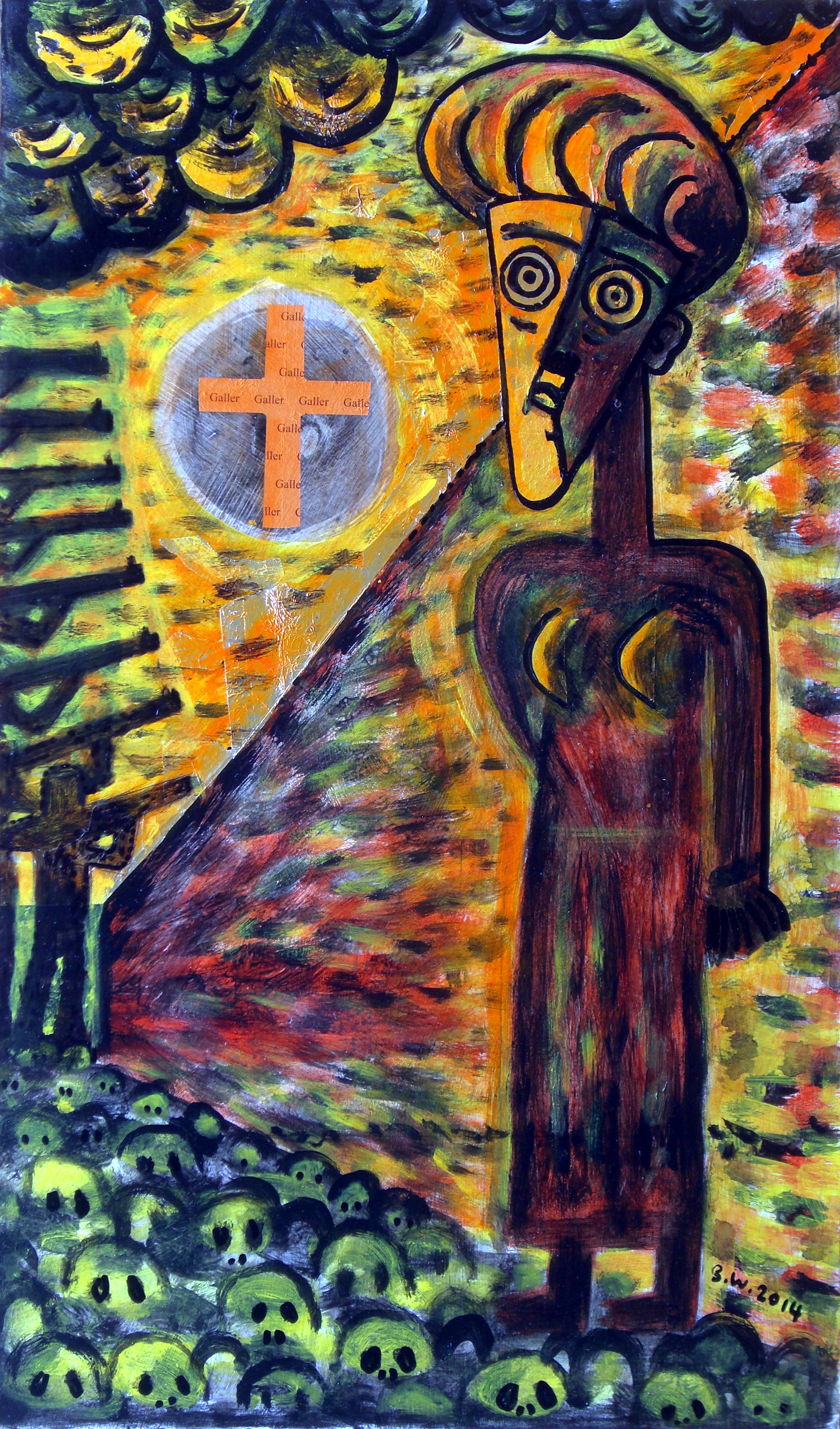
"Execution of Edith Cavell" one of 14 paintings by Brian Whelan commissioned by Norwich Cathedral

The paintings later in the following year traveled to Brussels Roman Catholic Cathedral and Cathedral of St. Michael and St. Gudula (close to Schaerbeek, where Edith Cavell was executed) before continuing its journey to Norfolk for permanent installation of the 14 panels at Norwich Cathedral to coincide with the 100th anniversary of Cavell's execution, in October 2015.

Whelan's painting The Martyrdom of St. Edmund permanently hangs in the Lady Chapel of St. Edmundsbury Cathedral in Bury St. Edmund, England and "Holy City with Herald" at the Hostal dos Reis Catolicos in Santiago de Compostela.

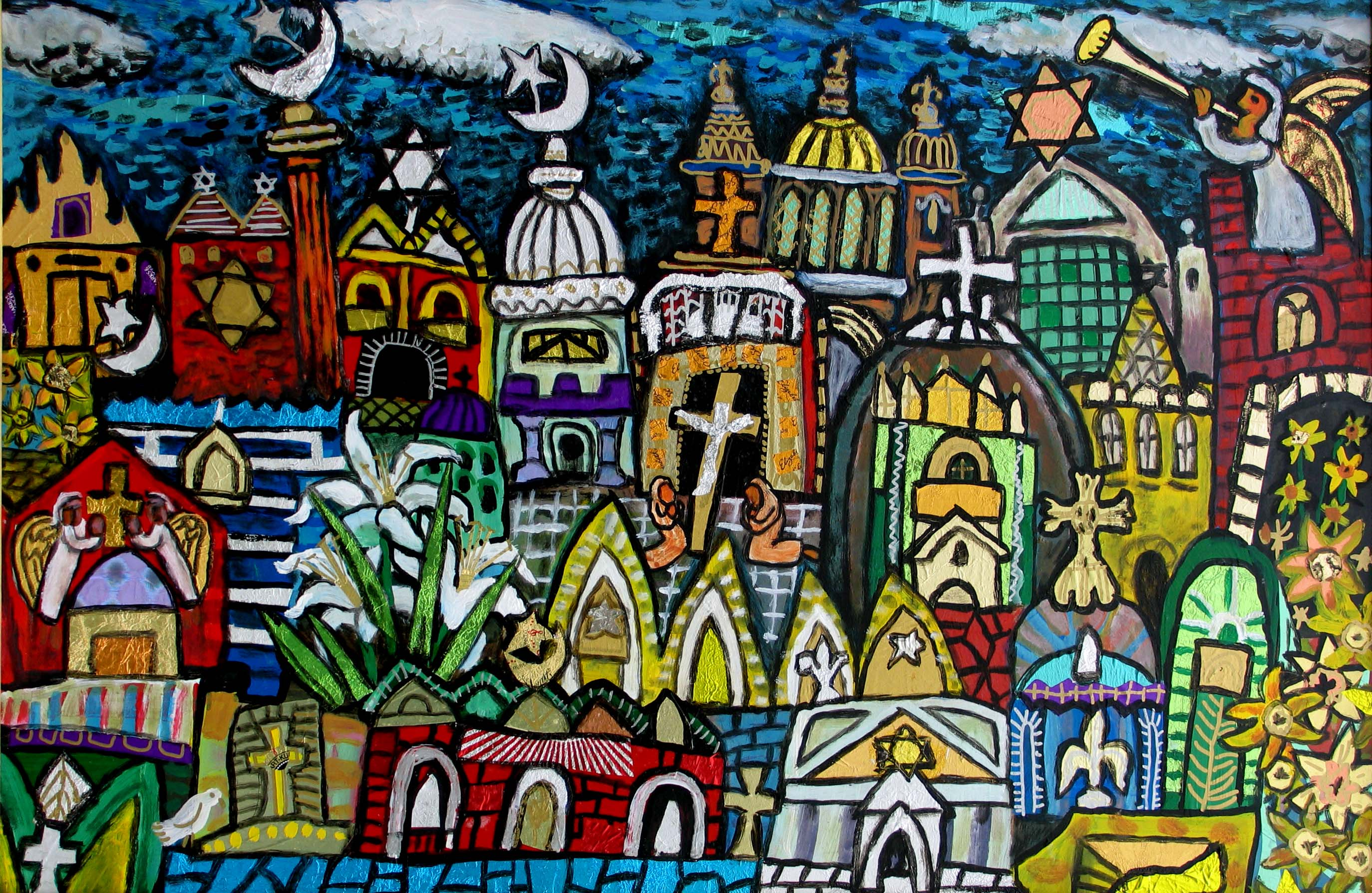
"Holy City with Herald" by Brian Whelan that is permanently installed in the Hostal Dos Reis Catoliccos in Santiago de Compostela

His images are used on the cover and contents of The Popes 2009 CD Outlaw Heaven and 2012 CD New Church as well as five releases from London Irish punk folker Anto Morra since 2013 until present day.

In summer 2009, Whelan co-curated The Quiet Men – London Irish Painters, the first major international tour (UK, Spain and US) of contemporary London Irish art. At the PM Gallery in Ealing, London Whelan first showed his large (2.7 m × 3.6 m) polyptych Transmetropolitan painting – an immigrants' joyride across the city of London and reference to the song of the same name by Shane MacGowen.In addition to Whelan's work, The Quiet Men tour included paintings by four other London Irish painters: Bernard Canavan, John Duffin, Dermot Holland and the late Daniel Carmody. The book by the same name published by The Irish World Newspaper was launched in 2010 by the Irish Embassy in London.
