= Roddy McCorley =

Irish nationalist

Roddy McCorley (died 28 February 1800) was an Irish nationalist from the civil parish of Duneane, County Antrim, Ireland. Following the publication of the Ethna Carbery poem bearing his name in 1902, where he is associated with events around the Battle of Antrim, he is alleged to have been a member of the United Irishmen and claimed as a participant in their rebellion of 1798.

== Early years and the 1798 rebellion ==
Roddy McCorley was the son of a miller and was born near Toome in the parish of Duneane, County Antrim. A few years before the 1798 rebellion, McCorley's father is believed to have been executed for stealing sheep. These charges may have been politically motivated in an attempt to remove a troublesome agitator at a time of great social unrest. Following his father's execution, his family were evicted from their home.

There is uncertainty as to whether McCorley was actually actively involved with the predominantly Presbyterian United Irishmen or the predominantly Catholic Defenders. McCorley's role in the 1798 rebellion itself is unrecorded. In a poem written 100 years after the rebellion by Ethna Carbery, he is claimed to have been one of the leaders of the United Irishmen at the Battle of Antrim, however, there is no contemporary documentary evidence to support this claim or prove that he was even active in the rebellion.

== Archer's Gang and capture ==
After the rebellion, McCorley joined a notorious outlaw gang known as Archer's Gang, made up of former rebels and led by Thomas Archer. Some of these men had been British soldiers (members of the Irish militia) who changed sides in the conflict, and as such were guilty of treason and thus exempt from the terms of amnesty offered to the rank and file of the United Irishmen. This meant that they were always on the run in an attempt to evade capture. This "quasi-rebel" group were claimed to have attacked loyalists and participated in common crime. It is believed that McCorley was caught whilst in hiding, having been betrayed by an informer.

== Death ==
After McCorley was arrested he was tried by court-martial in Ballymena on 20 February 1800 and sentenced to be hanged "near the Bridge of Toome", in the parish of Duneane. His execution occurred on 28 February 1800. This bridge had been partially destroyed by rebels in 1798 to prevent the arrival of loyalist reinforcements from west of the River Bann.

His body was then dismembered and buried under the gallows, on the main Antrim to Derry road. A letter published in the Belfast Newsletter a few days after McCorley's execution gave an account of the execution and how McCorley was viewed by some. In it, he is called Roger McCorley, which may be his proper Christian name.

Upon Friday last, a most awful procession took place here, namely the execution of Roger McCorley who was lately convicted at a court-martial, to the place of execution, Toome Bridge, the unfortunate man having been born in that neighbourhood.

As a warning to others, it is proper to observe that the whole of his life was devoted to disorderly proceedings of every kind, for many years past, scarcely a Quarter-sessions occurred but what the name of Roger McCorley appeared in a variety of criminal cases.

His body was given up to dissection and afterwards buried under the gallows…thus of late we have got rid of six of those nefarious wretches who have kept this neighbourhood in the greatest misery for some time past, namely, Stewart, Dunn, Ryan, McCorley, Caskey and the notorious Dr. Linn. The noted Archer will soon be in our Guard-room.

His great-grandson, Roger McCorley, was an officer in the Irish Republican Army in the Irish War of Independence (1919–1921).

== In popular culture and commemoration ==
Despite a lack of contemporary evidence of McCorley's actual involvement in the United Irishmen rebellion, he became a major figure in nationalist-republican martyrology due to a poem and song by Ethna Carbery called "Roddy McCorley", written in the 1890s. Historian Guy Beiner uncovered earlier references to Roddy McCorley in Presbyterian folklore, which he showed to have been repeatedly forgotten and obscured on the background of mainstream Presbyterian identification with Unionism.

Carbery's ballad was re-popularised (without attribution) by The Clancy Brothers and Tommy Makem, The Dubliners, The Kingston Trio, and others during the folk music revival of the 1960s. It was recorded in 1995 by Shane MacGowan and The Popes for their album The Snake and has also been recorded by other contemporary artists, such as Heather Dale on her 2006 album The Hidden Path. The melody for "Roddy McCorley" was reused in 1957 for "Sean South", about a failed operation that year during the IRA's "Border Campaign".

An account of McCorley's career compiled in the early twentieth century from local traditions and correspondence with his descendants, Who Fears to Speak of '98?, was written by the Belfast antiquary and nationalist Francis Joseph Bigger. It contains an edited version of an early 19th-century ballad about Roddy McCorley's fate.
