= Wand'rin' Star =

Single by Lee Marvin
- B-side: "I Talk to the Trees"; (Clint Eastwood)
- Released: 1970
- Length: 4:30 (album version); 2:59 (radio edit)
- Label: Paramount
- Songwriters: Alan Jay Lerner (lyrics); Frederick Loewe (music)
- Producer: Tom Mack

"Wand'rin' Star" is a song that was originally written by Alan Jay Lerner (lyrics) and Frederick Loewe (music) for the stage musical Paint Your Wagon in 1951.

== Lee Marvin recording ==
"Wand'rin' Star" was a number one single in the UK for three weeks and in Ireland for two weeks for Lee Marvin in March 1970. The song also peaked at number 10 in Australia. On the New Zealand Listener charts it reached number 17.

== Background ==
When the film of the musical was made in 1969, Lee Marvin took the role of prospector Ben Rumson. Not a natural singer, Marvin nevertheless sang all of his songs in the film, rejecting the idea of miming to another singer's voice. Despite the film being a box office flop, the soundtrack became a success. Orchestrated and arranged by Nelson Riddle, Marvin's version of the song "Wand'rin Star" became a number 1 single in Ireland and the UK, keeping The Beatles at number 2 in the UK with their single "Let It Be". Marvin never released a follow-up single, so he is considered a one-hit wonder.

== Cover versions ==
- A sound-alike cover appeared on the 1970 album Top of the Pops, Volume 10, with one reviewer using terms like "laryngitic croak" and "gargling gargoyles" to describe how he felt about the cover.
- "Wand'rin' Star" was covered by English comedian and novelist Julian Clary; his version was released as a single in the United Kingdom in 1990, backed with the self-penned track "Uncanny and Unnatural".
- Shane MacGowan and The Popes rendering was included on their 1997 album The Crock of Gold.
- NRBQ recorded a cover version on their 2002 album Atsa My Band.
- German dance group Scooter covered the song on their 2021 album God Save the Rave.

== Popular culture ==
- In 2002, the song was played at the end of Joe Strummer's funeral.

== Sample ==
sample of "Wand'rin' Star" by Lee Marvin
