= Neck (band) =

Celtic punk band from London

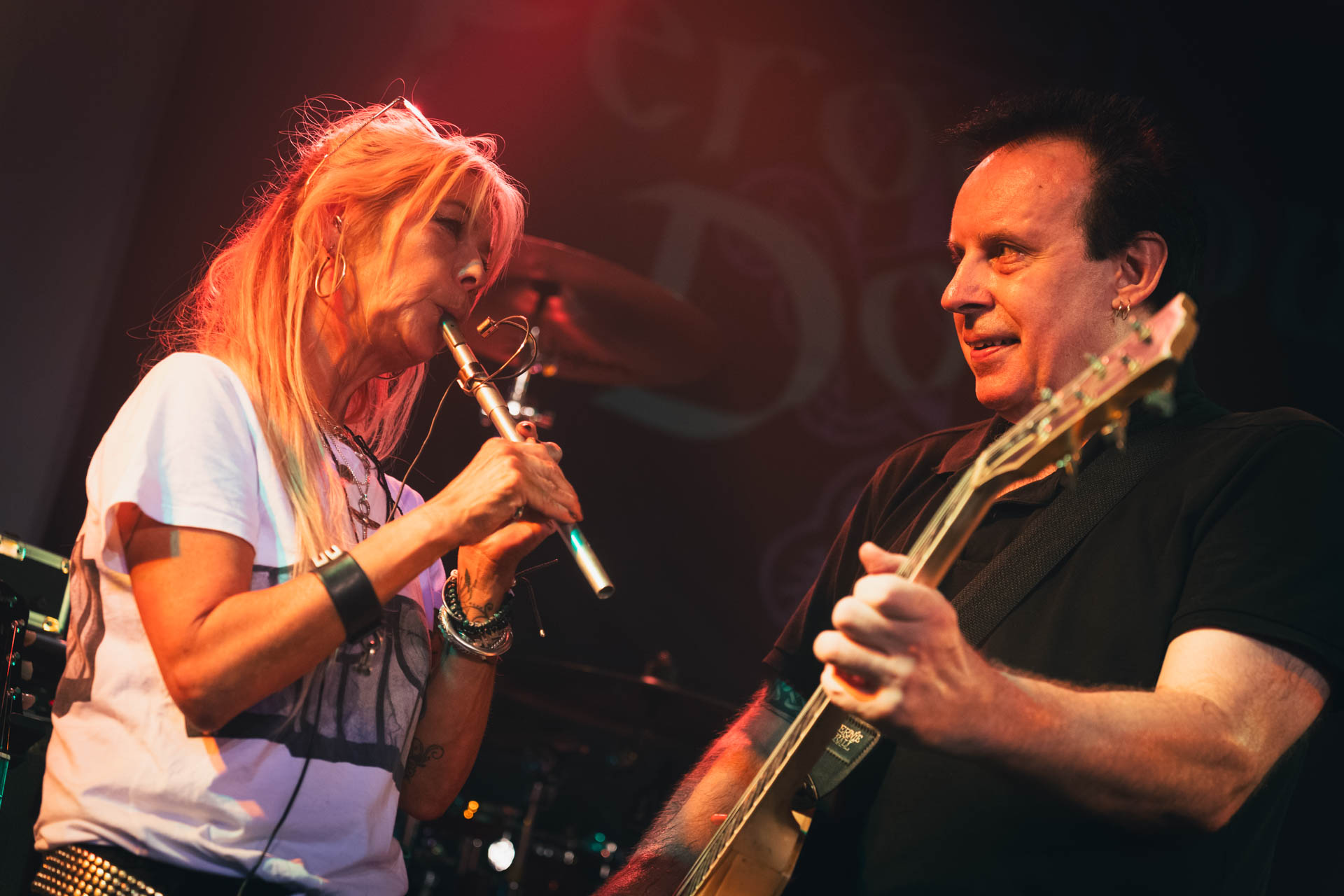
- in 2023

Background information
- Origin: London, England
- Genres: Celtic punk, folk punk, street punk
- Years active: 1994 to present
- Labels: Golf, Abstract/Candlelight, Paddy Plastic, Militant Entertainment, Hibernian, Bad Dog/CoreTex
- Members: Leeson O'Keeffe, Sara-Lou Bowrey, Simon Pwosion Pick, Tom Ashcroft, Jules Davies, Dan Camalich
- Past members: Leigh Heggarty (Ruts DC), Sean Gannon & Romeo Stodart (The Magic Numbers), Jason Cook (Blaggers ITA), Kieran "Mo" O' Hagan (Shane MacGowan and The Popes), Liam Marr (Booze & Glory)
- Website: Official website archive

Neck are a six-piece London-Irish Celtic punk band from the North London neighbourhood of Holloway led by Leeson O'Keeffe who was a member of Shane MacGowan and the Popes. The band was influenced by two other London bands: The Clash and The Pogues, blending Punk rock with traditional Irish music to play a London-Irish style known as 'Psycho-Cèilidh' where a cèilidh is an Irish social gathering with Gaelic folk music.

O'Keeffe died in April 2024 of cancer.

== History ==
=== 1990s ===
The band was formed in 1994 by Irish emigrants and second-generation Irish residents of Holloway. In 1999 Neck released The Psycho-Ceilídh EP and also appear performing two songs, the traditional "Carrickfergus" and the original "The Ferry Fare", in Belfast-set, Film 4 romantic comedy-drama With or Without You, directed by Michael Winterbottom.

=== 2000s ===
In 2000, the Neck appeared at Glastonbury for their first time and then they released their first album in 2001.

They toured extensively throughout the US, Europe, UK, and Ireland during the 2000s. Neck appeared at every Glastonbury from 2004 until 2008, including twice at 2007. They played numerous international festivals such as the Tantsy festival in Moscow Hermitage Garden; the Dublin Irish Festival in Ohio – the second-largest Irish festival in the US; South by Southwest in Texas in 2006; Paas Pop in Holland; The West Belfast Féile an Phobail in Northern Ireland and the Spraoi in Ireland; Punk & Disorderly festival as well as With Full Force in Germany. In the UK they appeared at The Levellers' own festival Beautiful Days, Solfest, Boomtown Fair all multiple times and the Rebellion Festival, ten times.

Neck's third album Sod 'Em & Begorrah!, released in 2005, was well received critically being ranked the second or third greatest Celtic punk album of all time, the latter behind only The Pogues and Flogging Molly.

They released an anti-racism / pro-inclusiveness anthem "Everybody's Welcome to the Hooley!" in 2006 which charted in the UK Indie Chart. The version of the song on the single also references and is dedicated to, Stephen Lawrence and Anthony Walker, two black British teenagers murdered in racially motivated attacks. Proceeds from the single went to Love Music Hate Racism.

Their fourth album Come Out Fighting! was delayed until 2009 by tour commitments.

In the 2000s their music also appeared on various motion picture soundtracks such as the "surreal" Pirates of the White Sand short (2005); The Emerald Diamond, a 2006 documentary film about the Irish National Baseball Team – contributing four songs, including the traditional "Star of the County Down" and the original "Every Day's Saint Patrick's Day"; the Boston-set Gang War Shoot-'em Up Beantown (2007); and the "Capraesque" homage to 'Small Town America Coming of Age' The Supermarket (2009).

=== 2010s ===
Come Out Fighting! was pushed back in the US and Europe until 2010. They appeared on Flogging Molly's Salty Dog cruise out of Miami in 2018.

== Influence ==
Their music reflects the life experience of the emigrant and second-generation Irish diaspora, with O'Keeffe's voice and song-writing considered faithful to the form, and in direct lineage from his former band-leader and mentor, Shane MacGowan of the Pogues.

Over half their members came from the London Irish traditional music session scene and their musicianship has earned them respect and admiration. They often perform acoustic "Unplugged / Irish traditional music session" sets, alongside full electric ones, with one performance at 'The Irish House' during the London 2012 Olympics sufficiently impressive that they were chosen by the Irish Cultural Centre in London to have the honour of performing a seisiún at the reception for the Irish Paralympic team at the London 2012 Paralympics. O'Keeffe was given the honour by Sinn Féin, to host such sessions for any social functions that they stage in London, including the centenary celebrations for the Easter Rising at the Portcullis House.

Their reputation led to various members being invited to collaborate both live and on other band's recordings. The most well known is O'Keeffe appearing, on banjo, with the Alabama 3 (alongside Segs of Ruts DC), and co-writing an original song "That's It, I Quit" on the Hayseed Dixie album No Covers. He has also played in the folk punk group Folk Finger alongside Cush and Ricky McGuire from The Men They Couldn't Hang and his old band-mate Danny Heatley from The Popes – including touring Ireland and a New Year's Eve show in Prague; and also 'depped' for the front-man of steampunk band The Men That Will Not Be Blamed for Nothing at the Glastonbury Festival.

They have been recognized as one of the leading bands on the international Celtic punk and folk punk scenes, alongside their US contemporaries Dropkick Murphys and Flogging Molly, with the Boston-based website covering the Celtic punk scene, Shite 'n' Onions, being named after one of their songs. Bands from Germany and the United States have covered their songs and O'Keeffe has been referenced in songs by other bands.

== Discography ==
=== Albums ===
- 2001: Necked (A Few Odds From the Oul' Sods)
- 2004: Here's Mud in Yer Eye!
- 2005: Sod 'Em & Begorrah!
- 2009: Come Out Fighting! (UK)
- 2010: Come Out Fighting! (US & Canada; Europe)

=== Singles and EPs ===
- 1999: The Psycho-Ceilídh EP
- 2002: The Fields of Athenry 'World Cup single'
- 2006: Everybody's Welcome to the Hooley! – proceeds go to Love Music Hate Racism

=== Movie soundtracks ===
- 1999: With or Withbout You (+ performance appearance)
- 2005: Pirates of the White Sand
- 2006: The Emerald Diamond
- 2007: Beantown
- 2009: The Supermarket
