= The Crock of Gold =

Crock of Gold may refer to:

- The Crock of Gold (novel), a 1912 philosophical novel by James Stephens
- The Crock of Gold (album), a 1997 album by Shane MacGowan and the Popes
- "Crock of Gold: A Few Rounds with Shane MacGowan", a 2020 documentary about Shane MacGowan
- "The Crock of Gold," a track from the 2005 album The Valley of the Shadow of Death, by The Tossers
- The crock of gold 1899 novel by Sabine Baring-Gould
- The crock of gold; a rural novel 1845 novel by Martin Farquhar Tupper

== See also ==
- Pot of Gold (disambiguation)
