= Shane MacGowan =

Irish singer-songwriter (1957–2023)

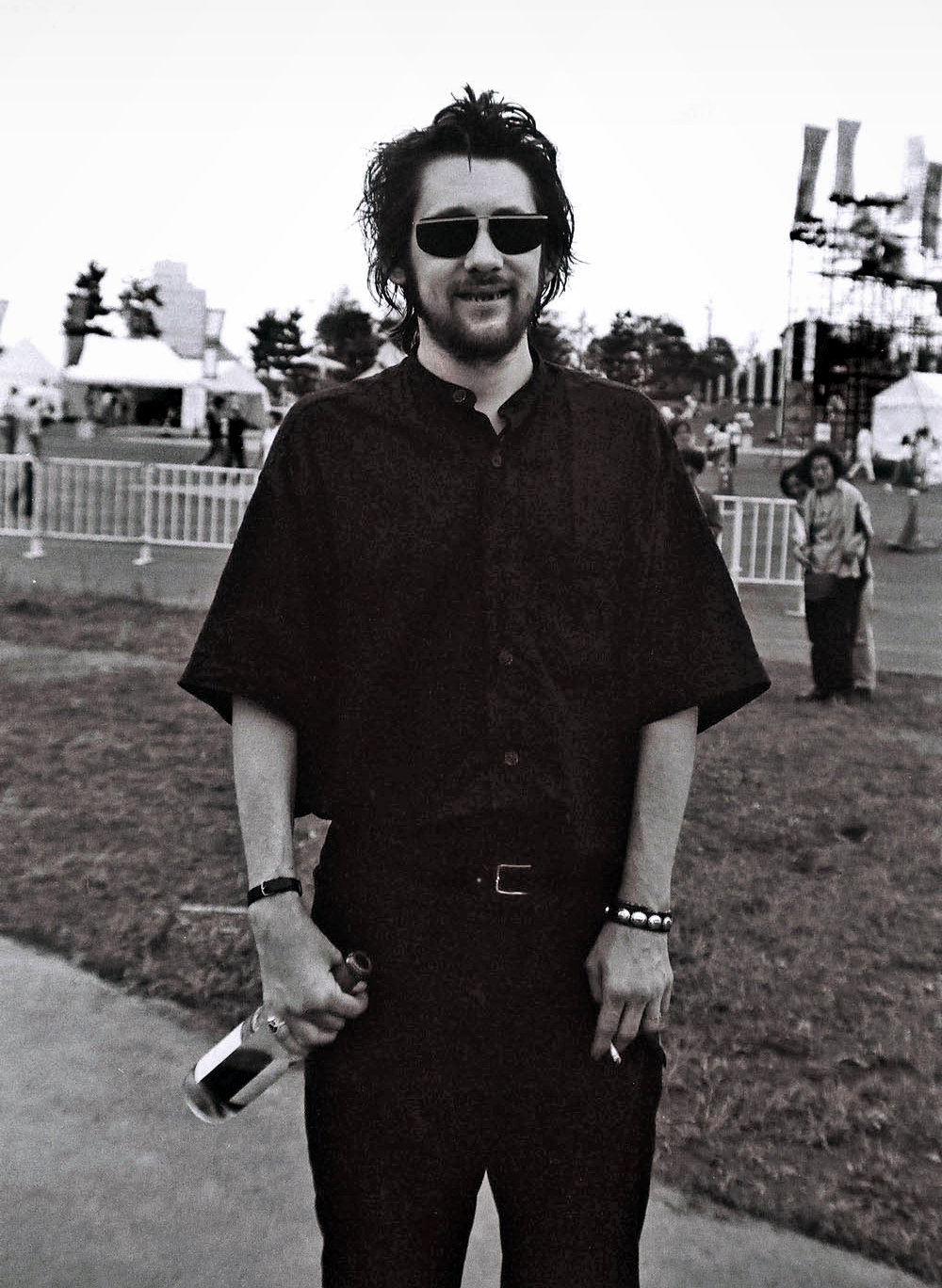
- MacGowan in 1991
- Born: Shane Patrick Lysaght MacGowan; 25 December 1957; Pembury, Kent, England
- Died: 30 November 2023 (aged 65); Dublin, Ireland
- Other name: Shane O'Hooligan
- Citizenship: United Kingdom; Ireland
- Occupations: Singer-songwriter; musician
- Years active: 1976–2023
- Spouse: Victoria Mary Clarke (m. 2018)
- Relatives: Siobhan MacGowan (sister)
- Musical career
- Genres: Celtic punk; Celtic rock; folk punk; folk rock
- Instruments: Vocals; guitar; piano; bodhrán; banjo
- Formerly of: The Pogues; Shane MacGowan and The Popes; The Nipple Erectors; The Shane Gang; The New Republicans
- Website: shanemacgowan.com

Shane Patrick Lysaght MacGowan (25 December 1957 – 30 November 2023) was an English-born Irish (Note: MacGowan identified as "London-Irish" and "completely Irish" on different occasions.) singer-songwriter, musician, and poet. Best known as the original lead vocalist and primary lyricist of Celtic punk band the Pogues, MacGowan was an acclaimed songwriter whose lyrics often focused on the Irish emigrant experience. He also received widespread media attention for his personal life, which included decades of heavy alcohol and drug abuse.

As a teenager, MacGowan became active on the London punk scene under the alias Shane O'Hooligan. In 1977, with then-girlfriend Shanne Bradley, he co-founded his first band, the Nips. In 1982, with Spider Stacy and Jem Finer, he co-founded the Pogues, who fused punk influences with traditional Irish music. MacGowan was the principal songwriter and lead vocalist on the band's first five studio albums, including Rum Sodomy & the Lash (1985) and the critically acclaimed and commercially successful If I Should Fall from Grace with God (1988). MacGowan and Finer co-wrote the Christmas hit single "Fairytale of New York" (1987), which MacGowan recorded as a duet with Kirsty MacColl; the song remains a Christmas favourite in Ireland and Britain and was certified sextuple platinum in the UK in 2023.

The Pogues dismissed MacGowan during a 1991 tour of Japan, as his drug and alcohol dependency increasingly affected their live shows. He formed a new band, Shane MacGowan and The Popes, with which he released two studio albums; he also collaborated with artists including Johnny Depp, Nick Cave, Sinéad O'Connor, the Jesus and Mary Chain, Dropkick Murphys and Cruachan. In 2001, he rejoined the Pogues for reunion shows and continued to tour with the group until it dissolved in 2014. In January 2018, to mark his 60th birthday, he was honoured with a gala concert at Dublin's National Concert Hall, where the president of Ireland presented him with a lifetime achievement award. Later that year, he married his long-term partner, journalist and writer Victoria Mary Clarke. Following years of deteriorating health, he died from pneumonia in Dublin in November 2023, aged 65.

== Early life ==
Shane Patrick Lysaght MacGowan was born on Christmas Day 1957 in Pembury, Kent, the son of Irish parents who were visiting relatives in England at the time. MacGowan spent his early childhood in Tipperary, Ireland. His younger sister, Siobhan MacGowan, was born in 1963; she later became a journalist, writer, and songwriter. MacGowan and his family moved to England when he was six and a half. His father, Maurice, from a middle-class Dublin background, worked in the offices of department store C&A and instilled an early love of poetry in his son; his mother, Therese, from Tipperary, worked as a typist at a convent, having previously been a singer, traditional Irish dancer, and model.

MacGowan lived in many parts of southeast England, including Brighton, London, and the home counties, and attended an English public school. His father encouraged his precocious interest in literature; by the age of 11, MacGowan was reading authors including Fyodor Dostoyevsky, John Steinbeck, and James Joyce. Aged 13, he was among the winners of a literary contest sponsored by the Daily Mirror. In 1971, he left Holmewood House preparatory school in Langton Green, Kent, with a literature scholarship for Westminster School. Found in possession of drugs, he was expelled in his second year. Aged 17, he spent six months in a psychiatric hospital due to drug addiction; while there, he was also diagnosed with acute situational anxiety. Briefly enrolled at St Martin's School of Art, he worked at the Rocks Off record shop in central London, and started a punk fanzine called Bondage under the pseudonym Shane O'Hooligan.

He first received public attention in 1976 at a concert by London punk rock band the Clash, where his earlobe was damaged by future Mo-dettes bassist Jane Crockford. A photographer took a picture of him covered in blood, which appeared in the music paper NME with the headline "Cannibalism at Clash Gig". Shortly after this, he and bassist Shanne Bradley formed the punk band the Nipple Erectors (later known as the Nips). During this time he lived in the Kings Cross area, Bloomsbury, 32 Burton Street and 68 Cromer Street, and worked behind the bar at the National Hospital for Neurology and Neurosurgery (then called The National Hospitals for Nervous Diseases) social club.

== Career ==
=== 1977–1982: Early music career ===
In 1977, MacGowan became active in the London punk scene as the frontman of The Nipple Erectors, later renamed The Nips. The band combined punk and rockabilly influences and gained some recognition on the independent music circuit after releasing several singles before disbanding in the early 1980s. Around this time, MacGowan also fronted a short-lived project called The New Republicans, which reflected his interest in blending Irish folk influences with punk. During these years, MacGowan was involved in London’s punk scene, but his summers in County Tipperary and his upbringing in an Irish household also kept him rooted in traditional music and republican culture. By the early 1980s, he had begun collaborating with Spider Stacy and Jem Finer in an Irish folk side project that eventually developed into Pogue Mahone (later renamed The Pogues), marking the transition from his punk beginnings to the hybrid sound that would define his career.

=== 1982–1991: Leading the Pogues ===
MacGowan drew upon his Irish heritage when founding the Pogues and moved from his early punk style towards a more traditional sound with tutoring from his extended family. Many of his songs were influenced by Irish nationalism, Irish history, the experiences of the Irish diaspora (particularly in England and the United States), and London life in general. These influences were documented in the biography Rake at the Gates of Hell: Shane MacGowan in Context. He often cited the 19th-century Irish poet James Clarence Mangan and playwright Brendan Behan as influences.

The Pogues' most critically acclaimed album was If I Should Fall from Grace with God (1988), which also marked the high point of the band's commercial success. Between 1985 and 1987, MacGowan co-wrote "Fairytale of New York", which he performed with Kirsty MacColl, and remains a perennial Christmas favourite; in 2004, 2005 and 2006, it was voted favourite Christmas song in a poll by music video channel VH1. Other notable songs he performed with the Pogues include "Dirty Old Town", "Sally MacLennane" and "The Irish Rover" (featuring the Dubliners). In the following years, MacGowan and the Pogues released several albums. In 1988, he co-wrote "Streets of Sorrow/Birmingham Six", a song by the Pogues which was controversial due to its support of the Birmingham Six – six men wrongly convicted of the 1974 Birmingham pub bombings, but still serving prison sentences for the bombings at the time – and was banned on British commercial TV and radio.

In Yokohama, Japan, during a 1991 tour, the Pogues dismissed MacGowan for unprofessional behaviour. The band's performances had been affected by MacGowan's drug and alcohol problems, and his bandmates parted ways with him following "a string of no-shows, including when the Pogues were opening for Dylan".

=== 1992–2005: MacGowan and the Popes ===
After MacGowan was dismissed from the Pogues, he formed a new band, Shane MacGowan and The Popes. The new band recorded two studio albums, a live album, three tracks on the Popes Outlaw Heaven (2010) and a live DVD; the band also toured internationally. In 1997, MacGowan appeared on Lou Reed's "Perfect Day", covered by numerous artists in aid of Children in Need. It was the UK's number one single for three weeks, in two separate spells. Selling over a million copies, the record contributed £2,125,000 to the charity's highest fundraising total in six years. From December 2003 to May 2005, MacGowan and the Popes toured extensively in the UK, Ireland and Europe.

=== 2001–2014: Return to the Pogues ===
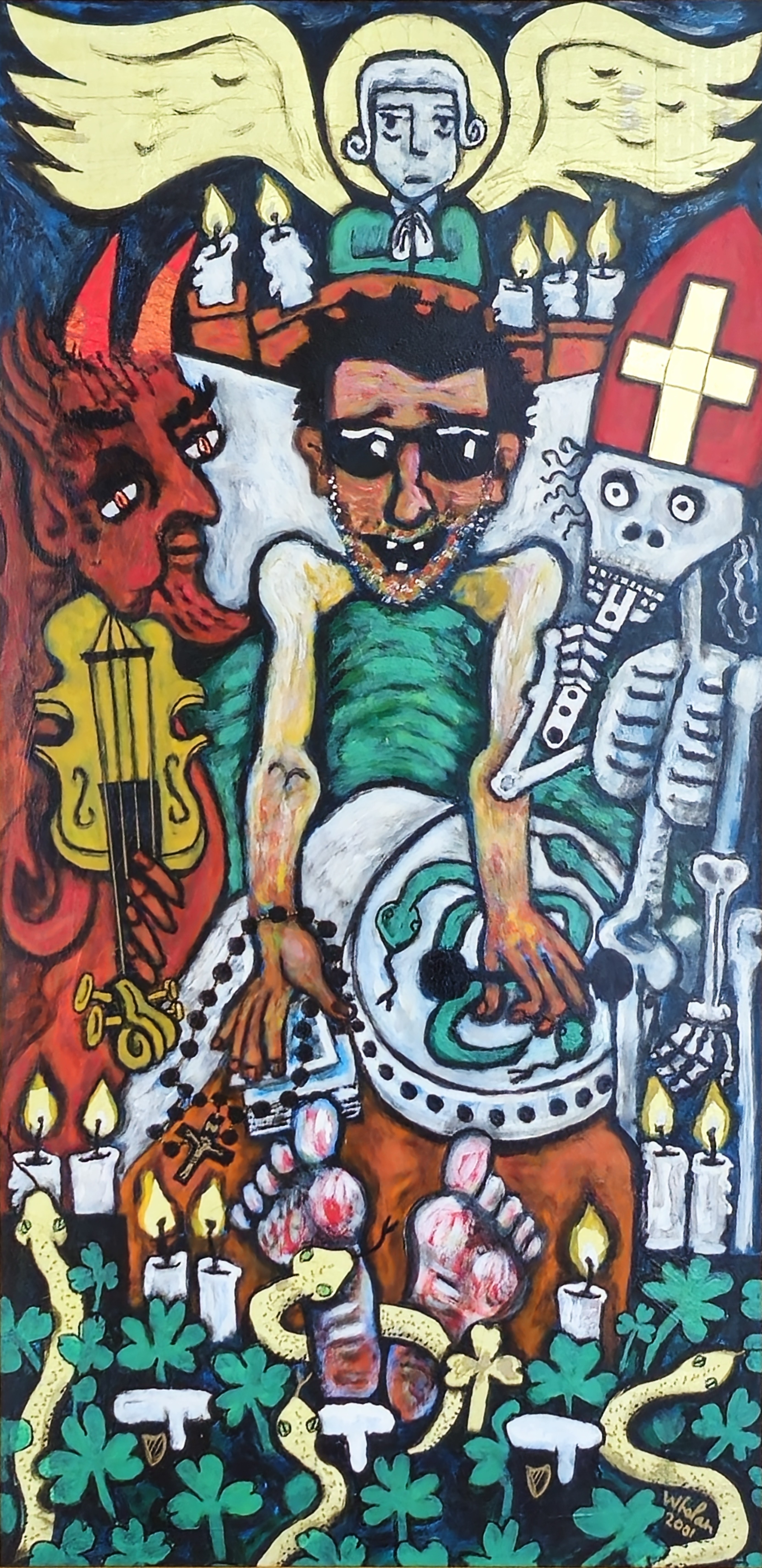
'Shane MacGown - Boy From the County Hell' painting acquired by National Portrait Gallery, London in 2026 by Brian Whelan

The Pogues and MacGowan reformed for a sold-out tour in 2001 and each year from 2004 to 2009 for further tours, including headline slots at Guilfest in England and the Azkena Rock Festival in the Basque Country. In May 2005, MacGowan rejoined the Pogues permanently. That same year, the Pogues re-released "Fairytale of New York" to raise funds for the Justice For Kirsty Campaign and Crisis at Christmas. The single was the best-selling Christmas-themed single of 2005, reaching number 3 in the UK Charts that year.

In 2006, he was seen many times with the Libertines and Babyshambles singer Pete Doherty; on occasion, MacGowan joined Babyshambles on stage. Other friends included Johnny Depp, who appeared in the video for "That Woman's Got Me Drinking", and Joe Strummer, who referred to MacGowan as "one of the best writers of the century" in an interview featured on the videogram release "Live at the Town and Country Club" from 1988. Strummer occasionally joined MacGowan and the Pogues on stage (and briefly replaced MacGowan as lead vocalist after his dismissal from the band). He also worked with Nick Cave and joined him on stage.

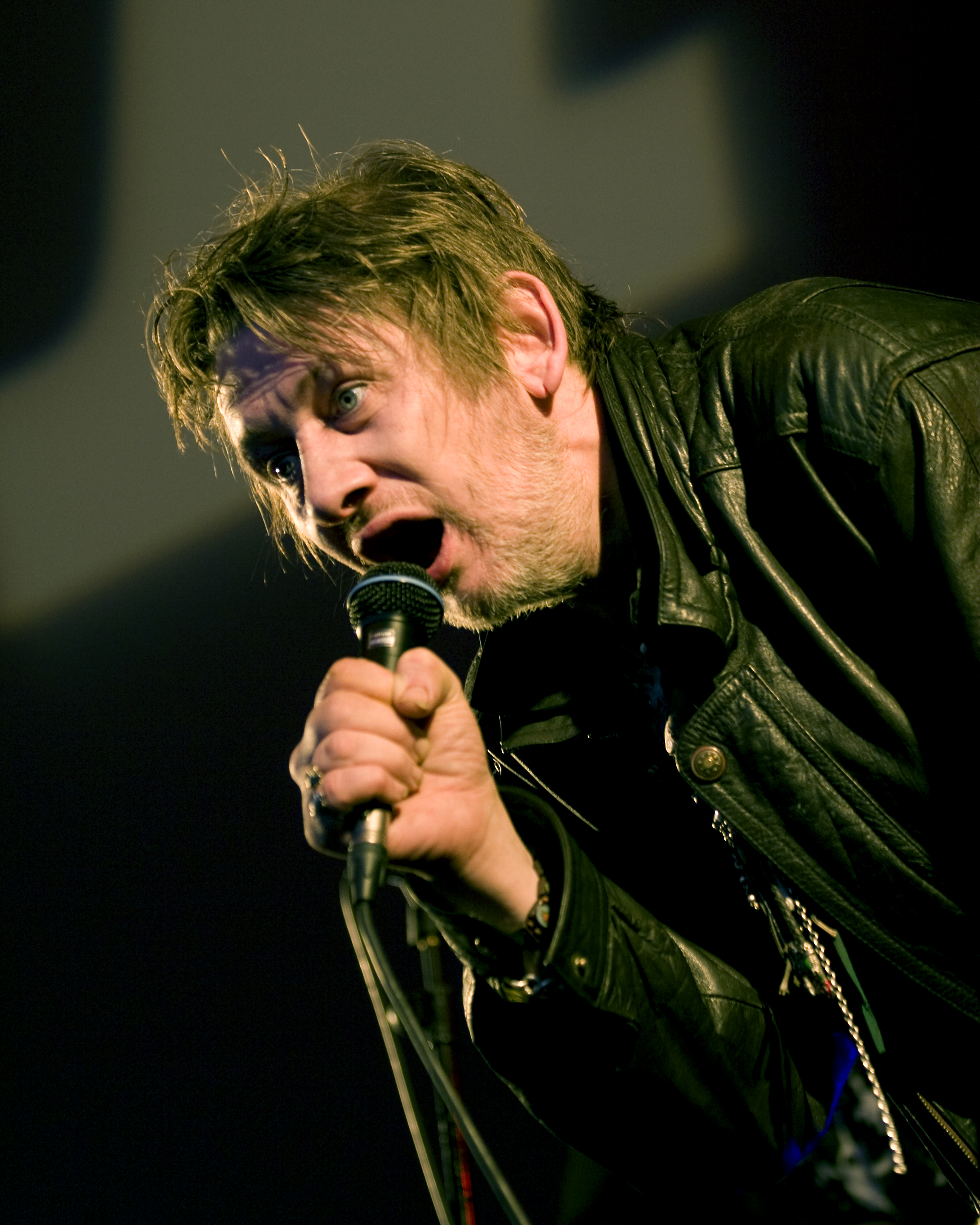
MacGowan in 2008

About his future with the Pogues, in a 24 December 2015 interview with Vice magazine, when the interviewer asked whether the band were still active, MacGowan said: "We're not, no", saying that, since their 2001 reunion happened, "I went back with [the] Pogues and we grew to hate each other all over again", adding: "I don't hate the band at all – they're friends. I like them a lot. We were friends for years before we joined the band. We just got a bit sick of each other. We're friends as long as we don't tour together. I've done a hell of a lot of touring. I've had enough of it."

=== 2010–2011: The Shane Gang ===
In 2010, MacGowan played impromptu shows in Dublin with a new five-piece backing band, the Shane Gang, including In Tua Nua rhythm section Paul Byrne (drums) and Jack Dublin (bass), with manager Joey Cashman on whistle. In November 2010, this line-up went to Lanzarote to record a new album. MacGowan and the Shane Gang performed at the Red Hand Rocks music festival at the Patrician Hall in Carrickmore, County Tyrone, in June 2011.

=== 2014–2023: Later career ===
MacGowan returned to the stage on 13 June 2019 at the RDS Arena in Dublin as a guest of Chrissie Hynde and the Pretenders.

Following the success of Feis Liverpool 2018's finale, in which he was joined by artists such as Imelda May, Paddy Moloney, Albert Hammond Jr and many more, MacGowan was announced to appear on 7 July alongside several guests for the Feis Liverpool 2019's finale. The event was ultimately cancelled due to a lack of ticket sales and funding issues. Feis Liverpool is the UK's largest celebration of Irish music and culture.

In 2020, MacGowan reportedly returned to the studio to record several new songs with the Irish indie band Cronin.

=== Media and charity work ===
MacGowan appeared in an episode of Fair City, shown on 28 December 2008. In 2009, he starred in the RTÉ reality show Victoria and Shane Grow Their Own, as he and his future wife, Victoria Mary Clarke, endeavoured to grow their food in their own garden.

In 2010, MacGowan offered a piece of unusual art to the Irish Society for the Prevention of Cruelty to Children (ISPCC) to auction to support their services to children: a drawing on a living room door. It earned €1,602 for the charity.

== Influences ==
MacGowan's lyricism drew on a wide range of figures across literature, politics and music: from Irish writers like Brendan Behan, Aodhagán Ó Rathaille, Brian Merriman and James Clarence Mangan, to the republican revolutionary Dan Breen whose memoir My Fight for Irish Freedom was the first book MacGowan read.

Other literary influences included WB Yeats, William Blake and Welsh writer Arthur Machen. His musical influences included the Sex Pistols, whose music influenced his early direction, and traditional performers such as the Dubliners and the Clancy Brothers, whose ballad traditions influenced his songwriting.

== Personal life ==
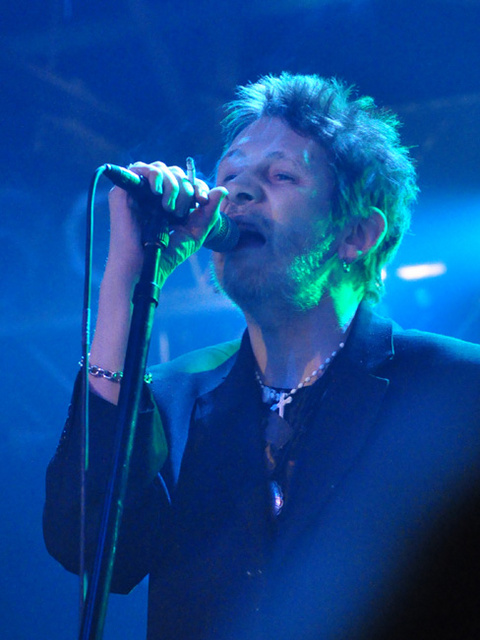
MacGowan performing in 2010 at the Milk Club, Moscow

MacGowan's mother Therese died on New Year's Day 2017 after her car collided with a wall near her home in Silvermines, County Tipperary. On 26 November 2018, after a decades-long relationship and an 11-year engagement, MacGowan married Irish journalist Victoria Mary Clarke in Copenhagen. They lived in Dublin. His father Maurice died in 2026 after a short illness.

MacGowan was a Roman Catholic, calling himself "a free-thinking religious fanatic" who also prayed to the Buddha. As an adolescent, he considered the priesthood.

=== Politics ===
In a 1997 interview with The Irish World, MacGowan said that he wished for "the peace process" to succeed, but believed it would "be a long, drawn-out process". He added that he wished for a quicker resolution that led to "the English" giving up all control of Irish lands, and for Ireland to become a "socialist republic".

In 2015, MacGowan stated that he had grown up in an Irish republican family and that he regretted not joining the IRA. In a filmed interview he said, "I was ashamed I didn't have the guts to join the IRA, and the Pogues was my way of overcoming that". The central figure in his 1997 song "Paddy Public Enemy No. 1" is based on ex-INLA leader Dominic McGlinchey. Asked his opinion of McGlinchey, MacGowan said "he was a great man". He also regarded former Sinn Féin leader Gerry Adams as a friend, according to his most recent biography.

=== Health and addictions ===
MacGowan "battled longstanding health issues, compounded by well-documented struggles with substance abuse". He was "a famously voracious consumer of drugs and prone to physical trauma".

MacGowan began drinking alcohol aged five, when his family gave him Guinness to help him sleep. His father frequently took him to the local pub while he drank with his friends. He suffered physically from years of binge drinking. MacGowan also used LSD, and he developed a heroin addiction during his tenure with the Pogues. In the 1980s, he "was repeatedly injured in falls and struck by moving vehicles". While in New Zealand during a 1988 Pogues tour, MacGowan "painted his hotel room, face and chest blue, apparently because 'the Maoris were talking to me'". Problems arising from his alcohol and drug abuse led to his firing from the Pogues in 1991, and he experienced stomach ulcers and alcoholic hepatitis in the 1990s. MacGowan often performed onstage and gave interviews while drunk. In 2004, on the BBC TV political magazine programme This Week, he gave incoherent and slurred answers to questions from Janet Street-Porter about the public smoking ban in Ireland.

In November 1999, MacGowan was arrested in London after Sinéad O'Connor found him passed out on his floor, and called the emergency services. MacGowan was charged with heroin possession in January 2000. When police formally cautioned MacGowan (a process that "requires the accused to admit their guilt"), MacGowan accepted the caution, and the criminal case against him was terminated in March 2000. O'Connor said she took this action in an attempt to discourage him from using heroin. Although he was furious with O'Connor at first, MacGowan later expressed gratitude to her and said that the incident helped him stop using heroin.

MacGowan experienced years of ill health towards the end of his life. In mid-2015, as he was leaving a Dublin studio, he fell and fractured his pelvis. After that, he used a wheelchair. Later that year, MacGowan said: "It was a fall, and I fell the wrong way. I broke my pelvis, which is the worst thing you can do. I'm lame in one leg, I can't walk around the room without a crutch. I am getting better, but it's taking a very long time. It's the longest I've ever taken to recover from an injury. And I've had a lot of injuries". He continued to use a wheelchair until his death in 2023.

In 2016, Clarke told the press that MacGowan was sober "for the first time in years". She indicated that MacGowan's drinking had "not just been a recreational activity", but that "his whole career has revolved around it and, indeed, been both enhanced and simultaneously inhibited by it". She said that his drinking problem was made much worse by the introduction of hard drugs such as heroin. Clarke added that a serious bout with pneumonia—compounded by his 2015 hip injury, which required a long hospital stay—was ultimately responsible for his sobriety. The hospital stay required a total detox, and MacGowan's sobriety continued after he returned home.

MacGowan was long known for having very bad teeth. He lost the last of his natural teeth around 2008. In 2015, he had a new set of teeth—including one gold tooth—fitted in a nine-hour procedure. The new set of teeth was secured by eight titanium dental implants. The procedure was the subject of the hour-long television programme Shane MacGowan: A Wreck Reborn.

In early February 2021, MacGowan broke his knee in a fall at his home. This left him bedridden for a short time.

MacGowan was hospitalised for an infection on 6 December 2022. He was diagnosed with viral encephalitis. Days after MacGowan entered hospital, Clarke told the Irish Independent that he "seems perfectly normal now – he is pissed off because he can't have a drink in the hospital". Clarke reportedly added that she had urged MacGowan to "ditch his hard-living lifestyle", but that her efforts had not been met with success.

== Death ==
It was reported on 23 July 2023 that MacGowan was hospitalised in an intensive care unit. Following treatment for an infection, he was visited by many celebrities while in hospital. He was discharged from St. Vincent's University Hospital on 23 November after four months of treatment, but was readmitted shortly afterwards with another infection. McGowan died from pneumonia at 3:30 am on 30 November, as he was receiving last rites, with his wife and sister-in-law by his side; he was 65. He left an estate of €849,733, which he willed to his wife.

On 8 December, MacGowan's coffin was borne through the streets of Dublin on a horse-drawn carriage as fans lined the route for his funeral procession. Later, hundreds gathered inside and outside Saint Mary of the Rosary Church in Nenagh, County Tipperary, including celebrities Nick Cave, Johnny Depp, BP Fallon, Bob Geldof, Aidan Gillen, President of Ireland Michael D. Higgins, and former Sinn Féin leader Gerry Adams. There was dancing inside the church as "Fairytale of New York" was performed by the Pogues with Glen Hansard, Lisa O'Neill, and John Sheahan from the Dubliners.

"Fairytale of New York" reached No. 1 in Ireland on the weekend of MacGowan's funeral. On 13 December, the Pogues reissued the song as a charity seven-inch single in tribute to MacGowan and to benefit the Dublin Simon Community, a homelessness charity that he had supported.

A pair of posthumous portraits, following MacGowan's last London visit, by Welsh artist Dan Llywelyn Hall, were unveiled in London to support the Encephalitis Society.

== Legacy ==
Following MacGowan's death, Michael D. Higgins, the President of Ireland, said: "Shane will be remembered as one of music's greatest lyricists. So many of his songs would be perfectly crafted poems, if that would not have deprived us of the opportunity to hear him sing them. The genius of Shane's contribution includes the fact that his songs capture within them, as Shane would put it, the measure of our dreams—of so many worlds, and particularly those of love, of the emigrant experience and of facing the challenges of that experience with authenticity and courage, and of living and seeing the sides of life that so many turn away from."

The New York Times described MacGowan as "a master songsmith whose lyrics painted vivid portraits of the underbelly of Irish immigrant life."

Tom Waits wrote on X: "Shane MacGowan's torrid and mighty voice is mud and roses punched out with swaggering stagger, ancient longing that is blasted all to hell. A Bard's bard, may he cast his spell upon us all forevermore."

Nick Cave called MacGowan "the greatest songwriter of his generation, with the most terrifyingly beautiful of voices". Bruce Springsteen said the "passion and deep intensity of [MacGowan's] music and lyrics is unmatched by all but the very best in the rock and roll canon... I don't know about the rest of us, but they'll be singing Shane's songs 100 years from now."

During a concert in Dublin in 2022, Bob Dylan paid tribute to MacGowan while onstage, describing the former Pogues frontman as one of his "favourite artists".

Paul Simon said MacGowan was "that kind of artist that needed to burn very brightly and intensely. Some artists are like that. They produce work that we treasure but they pay for it with their health – their bodily health and their mental health. That was Shane."

"One Last Goodbye (Tribute to Shane)", the 12th track on the 2025 Dropkick Murphys album For the People, is a tribute to MacGowan.

On 13 November 2026, a tribute album titled 20th Century Paddy - The Songs of Shane MacGowan will be released. The first single, released on 12 March 2026, was a cover of "A Rainy Night in Soho" by Bruce Springsteen. Johnny Depp, Tom Waits, The Jesus and Mary Chain, Dropkick Murphys, Hozier and The Libertines among others also appear on the album. MacGowan's widow Victoria Mary Clarke was behind the release of the tribute album and said "Each song is uniquely and graciously interpreted by these beyond beautiful artists, and his family are humbled by and thankful to each and every one of the musicians involved."

=== Autobiography and biographies ===
In 2001, MacGowan coauthored the autobiographical book A Drink with Shane MacGowan with his future wife, Victoria Mary Clarke. The book was published by Pan Macmillan.

Aside from Rake at the Gates of Hell: Shane MacGowan in Context, which covered a portion of his musical career, MacGowan was the subject of a 2015 biography, A Furious Devotion: The Life of Shane MacGowan, published by Omnibus Press. He was also the subject of several books and paintings. In 2000, Tim Bradford used the title Is Shane MacGowan Still Alive? for a humorous book about Ireland and Irish culture. Shaman Shane: The Wounded Healer by Stephan Martin describes MacGowan as a latter-day London-Irish spirit-raiser and exorcist. This commentary is found in the book Myth of Return: The Paintings of Brian Whelan and Collected Commentaries. London Irish artist Brian Whelan has painted MacGowan (for example Boy from the County Hell); his works are featured on MacGowan's official website, and he is also the illustrator of The Popes' Outlaw Heaven cover.

=== Honours and awards ===
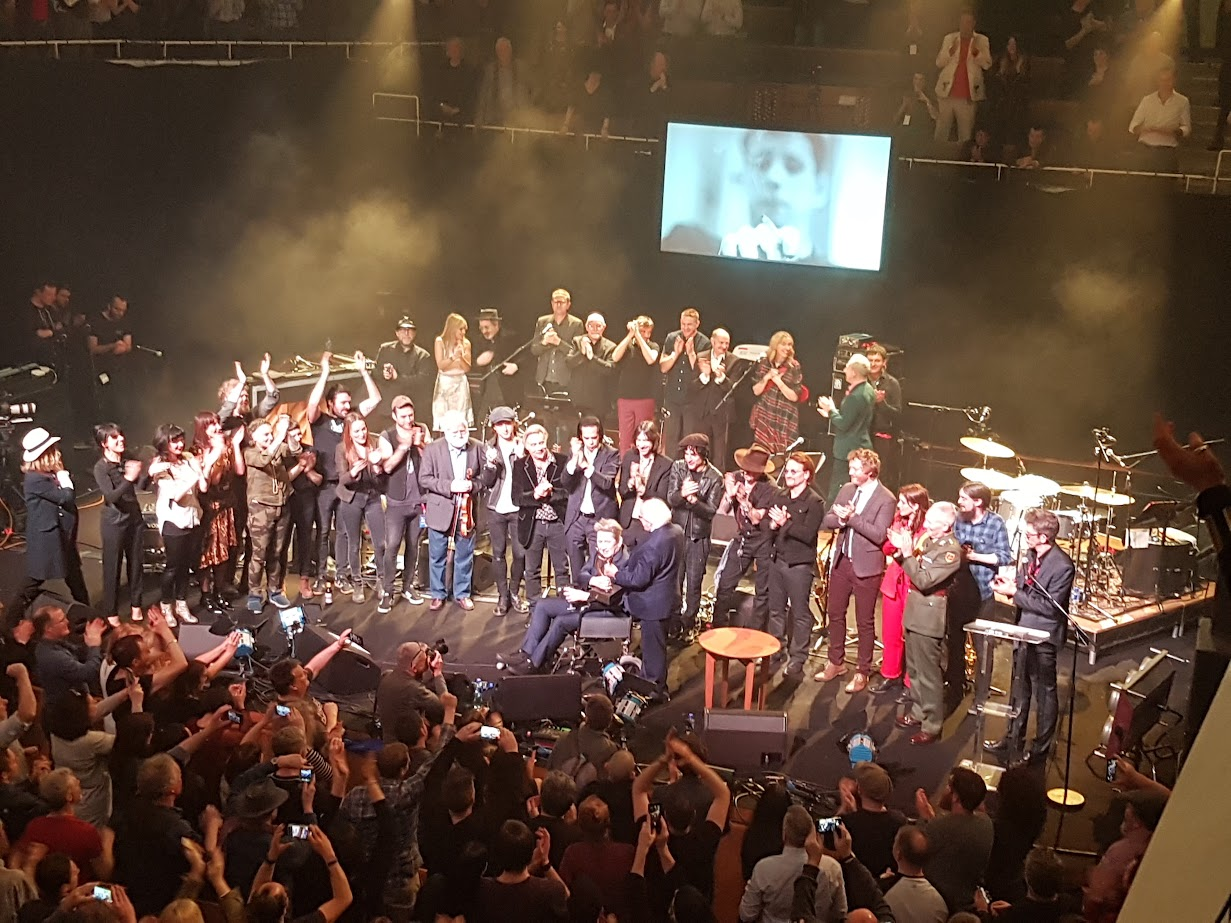
MacGowan receiving a Lifetime Achievement Award from President of Ireland, Michael D. Higgins, in the National Concert Hall, Dublin, on 15 January 2018

In 2006, MacGowan was voted 50th in the NME Rock Heroes List. In January 2018, MacGowan was honoured with a concert gala to celebrate his 60th birthday at the National Concert Hall in Dublin, where President of Ireland Michael D. Higgins presented him with a lifetime achievement award for his outstanding contribution to Irish life, music and culture. He also won the 2018 Ivor Novello Inspiration Award.

== Selected discography ==
=== The Nips/Nipple Erectors ===
- Bops, Babes, Booze & Bovver (1987/2003 – Archived Compilation)

=== Albums ===
With the Pogues

- Red Roses for Me (October 1984)
- Rum Sodomy & the Lash (August 1985)
- If I Should Fall from Grace with God (January 1988)
- Peace and Love (1989)
- Hell's Ditch (1990)
- The Pogues in Paris: 30th Anniversary concert at the Olympia (November 2012)

As Shane MacGowan and The Popes

- The Snake (1994)
- The Crock of Gold (October 1997)
- The Rare Oul' Stuff (2001 / January 2002) (a 2-disc best-of collection of B-sides and key album tracks spanning the years 1994 to 1998)
- Across the Broad Atlantic: Live on Paddy's Day — New York and Dublin (with Shane MacGowan and the Popes, February 2002)
- Outlaw Heaven (The Popes featuring Shane MacGowan 2009)

=== Singles ===
With the Pogues

- Poguetry in Motion EP (No. 29 UK)
- "The Irish Rover" (featuring the Dubliners) (No. 8 UK)
- "Fairytale of New York" (featuring Kirsty MacColl) – No. 2 UK; reissued in 1991 (No. 24 UK), 2005 (No. 3 UK) and 2007 (No. 4 UK)
- "Fiesta" (No. 24 UK)

Solo

- "What a Wonderful World" (with Nick Cave, No. 69 UK 1992)
- "The Church of the Holy Spook" (with the Popes, No. 74 UK 1994)
- "That Woman's Got Me Drinking" (with the Popes, No. 34 UK 1994)
- "Haunted" (with Sinéad O'Connor, No. 30 UK 1995)
- "My Way" (No. 29 UK 1996)
- "I Put a Spell on You" (Haiti Charity Song) (with Nick Cave, Bobby Gillespie, Chrissie Hynde, Mick Jones with actor Johnny Depp, Glen Matlock, Paloma Faith and Eliza Doolittle) (2010)

With Máire Brennan

- "You're the One" (1995)

=== Guest appearances ===
- "What a Wonderful World" (with Nick Cave, 1992)
- "Suite Sudarmoricaine", "Tri Martolod", "The Foggy Dew" (Foggy Dew) (with Alan Stivell, Again, 1993)
- "The Wild Rover" (with Sinéad O'Connor) – Soldat Louis, album Auprès de ma bande, 1993
- "God Help Me" (with the Jesus and Mary Chain, Stoned & Dethroned, 1994)
- "Death Is Not the End" (on Nick Cave and The Bad Seeds Murder Ballads LP, 1996)
- "Perfect Day" (Children in Need single, No. 1 UK, 1997)
- "The Wild Rover" and "Good Rats" (with Dropkick Murphys, June 2000)
- "Town I Love So Well", "Satan Is Waiting", "Without You", "Long Back Veil" (with Lancaster County Prison, on Every Goddamn Time) Coolidge Records 2003
- "Ride On" and "Spancill Hill" (with Cruachan, 2004)
- "Little Drummer Boy/Peace on Earth" (on the Priests' Noel, 2010)
- "Fix It" (on Alabama 3's Revolver Soul, 2010)
- "Sous le soleil exactement" (with Lulu Gainsbourg, From Gainsbourg to Lulu, 2011)

== Filmography ==
- The Punk Rock Movie – 1979 (archive footage appearance as himself)
- Eat the Rich – 1987
- Straight to Hell – 1987
- The Pogues – Live at the Town & Country – 1988
- The Ghosts of Oxford Street – 1991
- Shane MacGowan & The Popes: Live at Montreux 1995 – 1995
- The Great Hunger: The Life and Songs of Shane MacGowan – 1997
- The Filth and the Fury – 2000 (archive footage appearance as himself)
- If I Should Fall from Grace: The Shane MacGowan Story – 2001
- The Clash: Westway to the World – 2002 (archive footage appearance as himself)
- The Libertine – 2004
- The Story of ... Fairytale of New York – 2005
- Harry Hill's TV Burp – 2007
- Harry Hill's TV Burp – 2010 (Christmas special)
- Rab C. Nesbitt – 2011
- The Pogues in Paris: 30th Anniversary concert at the Olympia (DVD) – 2012
- Crock of Gold: A Few Rounds with Shane MacGowan – 2020
