= Pot of Gold =

Pot of Gold and similar terms may refer to:

- Pot of Gold (Mars), a rock on the planet Mars
- A leprechaun's pot of gold, in Irish mythology

== Brands and enterprises ==
- Pot of Gold, a brand of chocolate manufactured by The Hershey Company

== Art, entertainment, and media ==
=== Film, TV, theatre, radio ===
- Aulularia (translated as The Pot of Gold), an Ancient Roman play by Plautus
- Pot of Gold (TV series), an Australian television talent show
- Pot o' Gold (film), the 1941 film about the 1939 radio program
- "Pot o' Gold" (Glee), a Glee TV series episode
- Pot o' Gold (radio program), the 1939 radio program that was radio's first big-money giveaway

=== Music ===
==== Record Label ====
Pot of Gold, reggae label founded in Kingston, Jamaica, by Richie Stephens

==== Albums ====
- Pot of Gold, 1993 album by Richie Stephens on Motown Records.
- Pot of Gold (album), a 2002 compilation album by rock band Rainbow
- Pot of Gold, 2008 album by British neo-soul singer Alice Russell

==== Songs ====
- "Pot of Gold" (Akon song), 2005
- "Pot of Gold" (Game song), 2011
- "Pot of Gold", a song by Juliet Richardson from Random Order (2005)
- "Pot of Gold, a song by Asher Roth from RetroHash (2014)

== See also ==
- Crock of Gold (disambiguation)
- See Rainbows in culture for the belief about a pot of gold at the end of a rainbow
