= Victoria and Shane Grow Their Own =

- Genre: Reality television
- Starring: Victoria Mary Clarke; Shane MacGowan
- Narrated by: Stephen Rea
- Country of origin: Ireland
- Original language: English

Production
- Production location: Ireland
- Running time: 1 hour

Original release
- Network: RTÉ One

Victoria and Shane Grow Their Own is an Irish reality television special which originally aired on RTÉ One on Tuesday 8 December 2009. It follows the trials of Victoria Mary Clarke and Shane MacGowan as they endeavour to grow their own food in their own garden. The show documents Clarke's struggles to grow vegetables and MacGowan's attempts to assist. Filming of the special took place in Dublin. It has been compared to the 1970s sitcom The Good Life. MacGowan is from an agricultural background. First Lady of the United States Michelle Obama was said to have influenced the couple.

Victoria Mary Clarke admitted during the show that she had neither read nor bought the book she was supposed to use for assistance. She also spoke of her belief in angels and how she spoke to them. Clarke's friend, a Marina Guinness, provides her with an allotment to carry out her task. A celebration is also expected to take place when the crops have grown sufficiently. The potatoes which Clarke is attempting to grow turn black. Caterpillars which attack her food are thrown to the hens as food themselves. Various celebrities and well-known people also featured, including musician Glen Hansard, and cousins of British pop star Lily Allen made an appearance as well. A container of urine belonging to Shane MacGowan was auctioned by Clarke as the show drew to a close. The show was narrated by Stephen Rea, using an ironic tone. Clarke also wrote about her experiences in the Sunday Independent.

Pat Stacey, reviewer for the Evening Herald newspaper, gave the show one star out of five, calling it "a disjointed and rushed production" and questioning where the plot had been. Hilary Fannin, reviewer for The Irish Times newspaper, called the entire premise an "anarchic idea", satirically suggesting it was time for Ozzy Osbourne and Sharon Osbourne to move on as a replacement had been found. Olaf Tyaransen called it "an enjoyable hour of television". Dave O'Connell, reviewer for The Connacht Sentinel, "watched gobsmacked and cringed quite a bit", though later admitted the show had been "compulsive viewing".
