= Siobhan MacGowan =

Irish-British journalist and musician (born 1963)

Siobhan MacGowan (born in 1963) is the author of two novels, The Trial of Lotta Rae (May 2022) and The Graces (June 2023). Living in Ireland, she has also worked in journalism and the music business. She is the sister of the late Shane MacGowan, lead singer of the Irish group The Pogues.

== The Pogues ==
When The Pogues started out as "Pogue Mahone" in the early 1980s, Siobhan MacGowan designed posters and flyers to advertise their gigs. She also worked for The Pogues in 1988, editing and writing their fanzine, 'Ordnahone'.

== Music ==
In 1988, MacGowan moved to Dublin, Ireland and formed a band called The Frantic. The Frantic performed MacGowan's songs around such venues as The Rock Garden, The Baggot Inn and the Olympia Theatre. She also supported Hazel O'Connor (Breaking Glass) on an Irish tour and Mary Coughlan at the Mean Fiddler in London. In 1992, her video, Chariot, was shown on MTV on Christmas Day. In 1997, she recorded her album, Chariot, for Murgatroid Records, Limerick, which was released in Ireland and the UK in April 1998. She performed at the Point Theatre in Dublin with The Dubliners and Shane MacGowan on Christmas, 1998.

She worked as Van Morrison's personal assistant from 1992-1994, travelling the United States and Europe with him.

In 2002, MacGowan released a second edition of the album Chariot, containing a bonus track: 10. I love him with a Grace

== Journalism, press and copywriting ==
MacGowan worked at the Kent & Sussex Courier (Associated Press) as a copywriter for their advertising pages. She freelanced for various London and Kent based advertising agencies, writing articles for Smash Hits, Record Mirror, and FSM Monthly. She has worked as a freelance journalist, writing for The Irish Times, The Sunday Times and Mizz Magazine. In 1994, she moved to County Tipperary (Ireland) and worked for the Tipperary NR Council Arts Office. She has also undertaken art commissions, Celtic/funky art, under the name of "Cat MacZebedee". Her story for children, Etain's Dream, was serialised in the 'Nenagh Guardian'. Her debut novel, The Trial of Lotta Rae, was published by Welbeck in May 2022. Her second novel, The Graces, was published in June 2023.

== Other work ==
She has acted in Patrick Bergin's Yeats trilogy, Countess Kathleen.
