= Victoria Mary Clarke =

Irish journalist and writer

- Born: 11 January 1966 (age 60); Dublin, Ireland
- Occupations: Writer; journalist
- Spouse: Shane MacGowan (m. 2018; died 2023)
- Writing career
- Language: English
- Notable works: A Drink with Shane MacGowan, Angel in Disguise?
- Website: victoriamaryclarkeangels.com

Victoria Mary Clarke (born 11 January 1966) is an Irish journalist and writer known for her decades-long relationship with singer-songwriter Shane MacGowan of the Pogues, whom she first met when she was 16 and to whom she was married from 2018 until his death in 2023. She has written for British and Irish newspapers and magazines and is the author of two books, A Drink with Shane MacGowan (2001) and Angel in Disguise? (2007). She has appeared on a number of RTÉ television shows, including The Late Late Show and the reality television special Victoria and Shane Grow Their Own.

== Early life ==
Clarke grew up in the Irish countryside and went to national school in Renaniree. Her mother was born in Herbert Park and became pregnant with Victoria at the age of nineteen. She was abandoned by her father when she was a young baby.

== Career ==
Clarke is a music journalist who has written for a number of newspapers and magazines. She is the author of Angel in Disguise, a memoir and spiritual guide written after she split up with MacGowan in her late 30s.

== Personal life ==
Clarke had a long-term relationship with singer-songwriter Shane MacGowan, whom she met at 16, eight years his junior. She wrote the biography, A Drink with Shane MacGowan. They did not generally allow celebrities or journalists to frequent their house but Sinéad O'Connor was known to visit them. After an 11-year engagement, they married in November 2018 in Copenhagen. Clarke was with MacGowan when he died of pneumonia on 30 November 2023.

Clarke is a fan of literature and music. She is also a yoga enthusiast.

Clarke believes in angels and claims to speak to them on a regular basis.

== Popular culture ==
In 2007, Clarke appeared on Celebrities Go Wild, an RTÉ reality television show in which eight celebrities had to fend for themselves in rural Connemara.

In December 2009, Clarke and McGowan appeared together on the RTÉ One reality television special Victoria and Shane Grow Their Own in which they attempted to tend to their own vegetables at an allotment in Dublin.

Clarke appeared on The Late Late Show with MacGowan on 26 February 2010 to discuss their single for the 2010 Haiti earthquake relief effort.
