= The Snake (Shane MacGowan album) =

Studio album by Shane MacGowan and the Popes
- Released: 1994
- Genre: Rock
- Label: ZTT
- Producer: Dave Jordan

Shane MacGowan and the Popes chronology
The Snake (1994)	The Crock of Gold (1997)

The Snake is the first album by Shane MacGowan and the Popes, released in 1994 by ZTT Records. It peaked at No. 37 on the UK Albums Chart. The band supported the album with a North American tour.

== Production ==
The album was produced by Dave Jordan. The guest musicians included Johnny Depp and members of the Dubliners and the Pogues. "Her Father Didn't Like Me Anyway" is a cover of the Gerry Rafferty song. Colm Ó Maonlaí contributed on tin whistles. Like a number of songs recorded by MacGowan's previous band, traditional tunes are sometimes used as a base for a new song (for example, the melody for "The Song with No Name" is based on "The Homes of Donegal"). MacGowan wanted a less polished, more straightforward sound, likening the Popes to a bar band.

== Releases ==
An expanded edition was released in 1995. It had a revised running order and added three additional tracks: the traditional songs "Nancy Whiskey" and "Roddy McCorley", which had been released as b-sides the previous year, as well as a duet with Sinéad O'Connor—a new recording of the Pogues song "Haunted". The song also appeared on the soundtrack for the romantic comedy film Two If by Sea. A third edition, first released on vinyl in 1995, adds another duet, "You're the One", this time with Clannad's Máire Brennan, from the soundtrack to the film Circle of Friends. A fourth, further-expanded release appeared as a limited edition CD remaster in Japan only in 2009, adding the 1997 b-side "A Man Called Horse" as a bonus track.

== Critical reception ==
Professional ratings
Review scores
Source	Rating
AllMusic	4/5 stars
Calgary Herald	B+
Chicago Tribune	3/4 stars
Robert Christgau	A−
MusicHound Rock: The Essential Album Guide	3.5/5 stars
The Virgin Encyclopedia of Nineties Music	3/5 stars

The Guardian said that "the brassy 'A Mexican Funeral in Paris' is passable, despite MacGowan's slurring and rasping reaching the level of parody." The Independent concluded that "MacGowan abandons the more restless global influences which, for better or worse, infected the Pogues' later albums, returning to the rock'n'rebel-song Celtic-rock style of earlier years." The Calgary Herald wrote that "The Snake shows that Shane has lost not an iota of his irascibility, eccentricity and ability to wring every emotion out of a song."

Robert Christgau considered it to be MacGowan's second best work, after the Pogues' Rum Sodomy & the Lash. Mark Lepage, of The Gazette, opined that "most of the time, MacGowan is a lampshade looking for a party... I'd pay money to see him and his band do all of this live, and risk the odds, but the recorded version is slapdash even for him." The Los Angeles Times determined that MacGowan comes on "like the seedy, scrappy spawn of the Clancy Brothers and punk rock."

== Track listings ==
All songs composed by Shane MacGowan; except where noted

=== Original Edition ===
Released by ZTT in 1994 on CD and cassette in 1994 in Europe, Canada, Australia and Japan, and on vinyl in Europe only. Re-released on vinyl in Europe in 2016 by Music on Vinyl/WEA.

1. "The Church of the Holy Spook"
2. "That Woman's Got Me Drinking"
3. "The Song with No Name"
4. "Aisling"
5. "I'll Be Your Handbag"
6. "Her Father Didn't Like Me Anyway" (Gerry Rafferty)
7. "A Mexican Funeral in Paris"
8. "The Snake with Eyes of Garnet"
9. "Donegal Express"
10. "Victoria"
11. "The Rising of the Moon" (Traditional, arranged S. MacGowan)
12. "Bring Down the Lamp"

=== First Expanded Release ===
Released in 1995 on CD and cassette in the US by Warner Bros. Records/ZTT, in Europe by ZTT, and in Poland by Warner Music Poland

1. "The Church of the Holy Spook"
2. "Nancy Whiskey" (Traditional)
3. "The Song with No Name"
4. "Aisling"
5. "Roddy McCorley" (Traditional)
6. "Victoria"
7. "That Woman's Got Me Drinking"
8. "A Mexican Funeral in Paris"
9. "The Rising of the Moon" (Traditional, arranged S. MacGowan)
10. "The Snake with Eyes of Garnet"
11. "Haunted"
12. "I'll Be Your Handbag"
13. "Her Father Didn't Like Me Anyway" (Gerry Rafferty)
14. "Bring Down the Lamp"
15. "Donegal Express"

=== Second Expanded Release ===
Released by ZTT in 1995 on vinyl in France & Germany only, and on CD in Europe in 1998

1. "The Church of the Holy Spook"
2. "Nancy Whiskey" (Traditional)
3. "The Song with No Name"
4. "Aisling"
5. "Roddy McCorley" (Traditional)
6. "Victoria"
7. "That Woman's Got Me Drinking"
8. "You're the One" (Shane MacGowan, Michael Kamen)
9. "A Mexican Funeral in Paris"
10. "The Rising of the Moon" (Traditional; arranged by Shane MacGowan)
11. "The Snake with Eyes of Garnet"
12. "Haunted"
13. "I'll Be Your Handbag"
14. "Her Father Didn't Like Me Anyway" (Gerry Rafferty)
15. "Bring Down the Lamp"
16. "Donegal Express"

=== Third Expanded Release ===
Released by ZTT in 2009 as a limited edition remastered CD in Japan only.

1. "The Church of the Holy Spook"
2. "Nancy Whiskey" (Traditional)
3. "The Song with No Name"
4. "Aisling"
5. "Roddy McCorley" (Traditional)
6. "Victoria"
7. "That Woman's Got Me Drinking"
8. "You're the One" (Shane MacGowan, Michael Kamen)
9. "A Mexican Funeral in Paris"
10. "The Rising of the Moon" (Traditional; arranged by Shane MacGowan)
11. "The Snake with Eyes of Garnet"
12. "Haunted"
13. "I'll Be Your Handbag"
14. "Her Father Didn't Like Me Anyway" (Gerry Rafferty)
15. "Bring Down the Lamp"
16. "Donegal Express"
17. "A Man Called Horse' [Bonus Track]

== Personnel ==
The Popes

- Paul McGuinness - guitar, vocals
- Bernie "The Undertaker" France - bass, vocals
- Danny Pope - drums, percussion
- Tom "The Beast" McManamon, a.k.a. "Tom McAnimal" - tenor banjo
- Kieran "Mo" O'Hagan - guitar, vocals
- Colm O'Maonlai - whistles

with:

- Barney McKenna - tenor banjo
- John Sheahan - fiddle, whistle
- Brian Robertson - guitar
- Siobhan Sheahan - Irish harp
- Spider Stacy - whistle
- Jem Finer - 5-string banjo
- Tomas Lynch - uilleann pipes
- Rick Trevan - tenor saxophone
- Dick Cuthell - trumpet
- Sarah Jane Tuff - alto saxophone
- Paul Taylor - trombone
- Johnny Depp - "guitar weird noises" ("That Woman's Got Me Drinking")
- Máire Brennan - vocals on "You're the One"
- Sinéad O'Connor - vocals on "Haunted"
- Ron Kavana - guitar on "Haunted" (uncredited)

Technical

- Produced by Dave Jordan and Shane MacGowan
- Mixed by Steve Brown
- Engineered by Niall Flynn, Steve Musters, Darren Westbrook and Richard Rainy
- Recorded at Sarm East, Windmill Lane, Marcus, Raezor
- Mixed at Raezor
