= The Crock of Gold (album) =

The Crock Of Gold

Studio album by Shane MacGowan and the Popes
- Released: 1997
- Genre: Celtic punk, Celtic rock, alternative punk
- Length: 58:54
- Label: ZTT
- Producer: Shane MacGowan

Shane MacGowan and the Popes chronology
| The Snake (1994) | The Crock Of Gold (1997) | Across the Broad Atlantic (Live on Paddy's Day) (2002) |

Professional ratings
Review scores
| Source | Rating |
|---|---|
| Uncut | 4/5 stars |
| NME | 4/10 stars |

The Crock of Gold was the second and final full-length album by Shane MacGowan and the Popes and was released in November 1997 on ZTT Records. The Crock of Gold followed The Snake, MacGowan's first solo album after the breakup of the Pogues, and was less critically acclaimed than its predecessor. The album is named for the novel by Irish writer James Stephens. It is the last full studio album MacGowan recorded before his passing in November 2023.

The Crock of Gold was written primarily by MacGowan in Nenagh, The Republic of Ireland and was recorded at Wessex Studios in London, England. The original sessions were produced by Brian Robertson who was later replaced by Adrian Sherwood and engineer Alan Branch.

According to Rob Martin, writing for Spinal Column in 1998, "The Crock of Gold has one really solid song after another in the quasi-Celtic folk rock traditional style. The only negative is that there's not too much experimentation on the album. The only real unusual track is 'B&I Ferry', which has a reggae dub style. However, all the songs on the album are exactly what you'd expect from MacGowan. There are songs of lost love, drunken sorrows, loneliness, character portraits, and pride. All contain Shane's gritty and soulful trademark voice (and the vocals actually come off clear on the recordings- always a crapshoot when it comes to MacGowan's pipes). Although it's tough to top the work that MacGowan did with the Pogues, The Crock of Gold is a worthy effort that fans of MacGowan and the Pogues are sure to enjoy." Kitty Empire, writing in NME, said that it contained "tunes so hackneyed they've lost all trace of ownership", although singled out "Skipping Rhymes" as "[blazing] along not unlike the Poguetry of old."

Like a number of songs by the Pogues, traditional Irish tunes are used as base melodies for some songs; including "Paddy Public Enemy Number One", which combines the tune of "The Man From Mullingar" with "The Kesh Jig"; and "More Pricks Than Kicks", to the tune "Tabhair Dom Do Lamh".

== Track listing ==
All tracks composed by Shane MacGowan; except where indicated

1. "Paddy Rolling Stone"
2. "Rock 'n' Roll Paddy"
3. "Paddy Public Enemy No. 1"
4. "Back in the County Hell"
5. "Lonesome Highway"
6. "Come to the Bower" (traditional; arranged MacGowan)
7. "Céilídh Cowboy"
8. "More Pricks Than Kicks"
9. "Truck Drivin' Man"
10. "Joey's in America"
11. "B&I Ferry" (The Popes)
12. "Mother Mo Chroi"
13. "Spanish Lady" (traditional; arranged MacGowan)
14. "St. John of Gods"
15. "Skipping Rhymes" (traditional; arranged MacGowan)
16. "Maclennan" (The Popes, Tom McManamon)
17. "Wanderin' Star" (Al Lerner, Frederick Loewe)
18. "My Way" [Bonus Track on 2016 Japanese remastered CD release only]

== Personnel ==
The Popes

- Tom McAnimal - banjo
- Paul "Mad Dog" McGuinness - guitar, backing vocals
- John "The Riddler" Myers - fiddle, whistle, guitar
- Danny Pope - drums, percussion, backing vocals
- "Lucky" Dowling - bass, backing vocals
- Kieran Kiely - saltarelle accordion, overton whistle, backing vocals

with:

- Ed Deane - lap steel and Spanish guitar
- Charlie MacLennan - vocals ("Wanderin' Star")

Technical

- Produced by Shane MacGowan
- Mixed by Adrian Sherwood
- Engineered by Alan Branch
- Recorded and mixed at Wessex, Matrix, and On-U Studios
- Cover painting by Shane MacGowan
