= Outlaw Heaven =

2009 album by the Popes

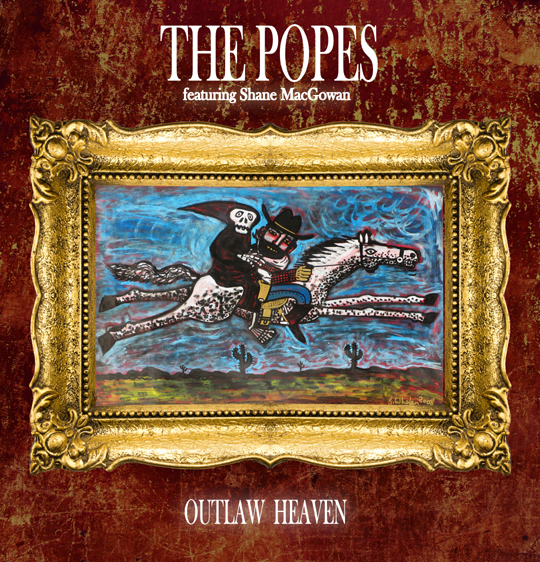
- CD Cover by Brian Whelan

Studio album by The Popes
- Released: May 2009

Outlaw Heaven is the second studio album by London-Irish rock band The Popes, which was originally due for release in September 2008, but was delayed until May 2009. The sound has been compared to Thin Lizzy and Van Morrison.

As well as lead singer Paul McGuinness, the line-up for the album includes drummer Will Morrison, guitarist and producer Charlie Hoskyns, Laurie Norwood on bass, Fiachra Shanks on mandolin and guitar, Gerry Diver on fiddle (nine tracks) and Ben Gunnery on fiddle on "Black Is The Colour". Shane MacGowan, a founder and former member of the band, appears on three of the tracks. Another Pogue, Spider Stacey, appears on the title track.

McGuinness began writing the songs for the album when he spent four and a half months in HM Prison Pentonville on remand in 2006. Gavin Martin of the Daily Mirror described the record as "for diehards only." The Irish World called it "a storming showcase of their exciting new material."

== Track listing ==
1. "Outlaw Heaven"
2. "Raw"
3. "Don't Let the Bastards Grind You Down"
4. "Shine"
5. "Angels are Coming"
6. "Slip Away"
7. "Back in Your Heart again"
8. "Crucified"
9. "Boys Don't Cry"
10. "Black is the Colour"
11. "We Live (Underneath the Blue Sky)"
12. "The Loneliness of a Long Distance Drinker" (Written with Bob Dowling)
