= Shane MacGowan and The Popes =

Irish band formed in 1992

The Popes
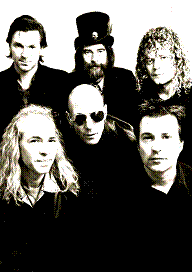

Background information
- Also known as: Shane MacGowan and the Popes
- Origin: Dublin, Ireland
- Genres: Celtic punk, folk-punk
- Years active: 1992–1998 as Shane MacGowan & the Popes; 1998–2013 as the Popes
- Label: Madfish
- Past members: Shane MacGowan; Paul McGuinness; Tom McManamon; Danny Heatley; Berni France; Kieran "Mo" O'Hagan; Leeson O'Keeffe; Colm Ó Maonlaí; Paul Conlon; Mick O'Connell; John Myers; Bob Dowling; Kieran Kiely; Andy Ireland; Andy Nolan; Mick O'Connell; Brian Kelly; Miriam Kavana; Charlie Hoskyns; Will Morrison; Gerry Diver; Laurie Norwood; Fiachra Shanks; Ben Gunnery; Jim McAllister; Dave Allen; Mick Rowan; Ian Bramble; Greg Courtney
- Website: www.thepopesofficialsite.com

The Popes are a band originally formed by Shane MacGowan (ex-Pogues), who played a blend of rock, Irish folk and Americana.

Shane MacGowan and the Popes released two studio and one live album in the 1990s, performing live together until 2005. During this era, the Popes also recorded and gigged on their own until 2006. At the end of 2006, guitarist Paul "Mad Dog" McGuinness reformed the band and led it until 2013.

== History ==
=== 1992–2005: Shane MacGowan and the Popes ===
After departing the Pogues, singer Shane MacGowan took a number of people from the Pogues' extended family with him, including crew members Paul "Mad Dog" McGuinness, Tommy "The Beast" McManamon (aka "Tom McAnimal"), soundman Dave Jordon, and road manager Big Charlie MacLennan.

McGuinness and McManamon formed the core of the band, on guitar and tenor banjo respectively. Joining them were guitarist Kieran "Mo" O'Hagan and bass player Bernie France, who had both played with MacGowan in a short-lived group called the London Contemporary Five (France was also an old friend and one-time teenage bandmate of MacGowan's, in the group Hot Dogs with Everything). Ex-Exploited and Boothill Foot Tappers drummer Danny Heatley and whistle player Colm Ó Maonlaí rounded out the lineup (although a few others went through the ranks in the early days, including Leeson O'Keeffe and Ron Kavana, among others). This lineup put out the album The Snake in 1994 and toured internationally, joined by multiple other musicians, including John "The Riddler" Myers on fiddle, whistle, and guitar.

Johnny Depp, who guested on guitar on The Snake and directed and appeared in the video of "That Woman's Got Me Drinking", joined the group on Top of the Pops and a few other appearances.

The group released its second album, The Crock of Gold in 1997. The core group now included John Myers and Kieran Kiely (on accordions and whistles) as members, with Bob "Lucky" Dowling replacing Bernie France on bass.

By the time of the 2001 live album Across The Broad Atlantic, the lineup was MacGowan / McGuiness / McManamon / Dowling, with Andy Ireland on drums and Mick O'Connell on accordions.

In 2001, MacGowan rejoined The Pogues for a reunion tour, and that group remained intermittingly active for the next 13 years, leading to a decline in activity for Shane MacGowan and The Popes. The group continued to tour, with various lineup changes, until their final show on 17 March 2005.

=== 1998–2006: The Popes ===
As well as backing MacGowan both live and on his solo albums, the McGuinness–McManamon incarnation of The Popes recorded a few singles and one studio album, Holloway Boulevard, released in March 2000. A live album, Release The Beast (Live in London 2003), followed in 2004.

=== 2006–2013: The Popes reformed ===
Following the death of banjo player Tommy McManamon at the end of 2006, Paul McGuinness reformed The Popes with a new line-up including Charlie Hoskyns (Lisa Knapp, Badly Mixed Bastards) on guitar, Will Morrison (Here be Dragons, Lisa Knapp) on drums, Laurie Norwood on bass and Ben Gunnery on fiddle.

A new album was eventually released in 2009 as Outlaw Heaven, featuring Fiachra Shanks on mandolin and guitar and Shane MacGowan as a guest vocalist on three songs and Pogue Spider Stacy joining MacGowan and McGuinness on vocals on the title track.

The line-up changed once again with the arrival of Jim McAllister on bass, Dave Allen on fiddle, and Whiskey Mick Rowan on mandolin.

The band toured internationally before releasing a follow-up in 2012, New Church. The album was followed by another tour including dates opening for The Stranglers. Shortly after the release of New Church, Charlie Hoskyns left the band and was replaced by Ian Bramble on guitar and backing vocals. Jim McAllister also left the band and was replaced by Greg Courtney on bass. This lineup toured extensively in Europe and Australia.

A new album with new material written by Paul McGuinness and the new line-up, and previous material telling the story of the Popes, was planned for 2014, but all activity halted due to a brain injury suffered by McGuinness in November 2013. A benefit concert on 20 December 2013, for McGuinness, billed as "The Popes & Friends" was the last performance by the group.

== Later activities ==
Leeson O'Keeffe formed the "psycho celli" group Neck in 1994, and led it until shortly before his death from pancreatic cancer in 2014.

Colm Ó Maonlaí went on to a successful acting career, including a role in Eastenders.

Producer and sound man Dave Jordan died of a heroin overdose in Paris, while on the road with the band in March 1995.

Road manager Charlie MacLennan died of a drug-induced heart attack in October 1996.

Kieran "Mo" O'Hagan died on 20 March 2000.

Founding member Tom McManamon (born on 30 May 1961 in London, England), died on 15 December 2006, after a long battle with illness from liver disease.

A memorial for McManamon in March 2007 saw Bob Dowling, Andy Ireland, and Brian Kelly reunite as the Popes, joined by Miriam Kavana and Denis Dowling.

Kieran Kiely went on to work with The Corrs, Sinéad O'Connor, Dave Stewart, Wyclef Jean, Stevie Nicks and others, and composes music for film and television.

Multi-instrumentalist John Myers went on to work with Sinead O'Connor and moved into a career of songwriting and production.

Accordion player Andy Nolan went on to co-found The BibleCode Sundays in 2006.

Banjo player Brian Kelly went on to join Creeds Cross, and released two instrumental records under his own name.

Violinist Dave Allen and guitarist Ian Bramble released a Christmas song and an album with John Coghlan.

Drummer Will Morrison has played in Welsh band Here Be Dragons.

In November 2013, Paul McGuinness suffered a serious head injury after being hit by a car and was hospitalized for months, and then living in the brain injury rehabilitation unit at Homerton Hospital for months further. He has since played a few fundraisers, and leads a band called "Aisling".

Founder Shane MacGowan continued to perform with The Pogues until their dissolution in 2014, and passed away on 30 November 2023 from pneumonia, following a long battle with encephalitis.

== Personnel ==
- Shane MacGowan - vocals (1993 - 2005)
- Paul "Mad Dog" McGuinness – guitar, vocals (1993–2013)
- Tom "The Beast" McManamon, aka "Tom McAnimal" – tenor banjo (1993–2005)
- Danny Heatley, aka "Danny Pope" – drums, percussion, backing vocals (1993–1998)
- Bernie "The Undertaker" France – bass, vocals (1993–1995)
- Kieran "Mo" O'Hagan – guitar, backing vocals (1993–1994)
- Leeson O'Keeffe – lead guitar, 5-string banjo, backing vocals (1993-1994) (live only)
- Colm O'Maonlai – whistle (1993–1994)
- Paul Conlon – whistle (1994–1995) (live only)
- John "The Riddler" Myers – fiddle, whistle, guitar (1995–1998)
- Bob "Lucky" Dowling – bass, backing vocals (1996–2006)
- "Slimy" Kieran Kiely – accordion, whistle, backing vocals (1995–1999)
- Andy "Reg" Ireland – drums, percussion (1998–2006)
- Andy Nolan – accordion (1999–?)
- Mick O'Connell – accordion (?–2002)
- Brian Kelly – tenor banjo (?–?)
- Mirian Kavana – fiddle (?–?)
- Charlie Hoskyns – guitar, backing vocals (2006–2012)
- Will Morrison – drums (2006–2013)
- Gerry Diver – fiddle, banjo (2008)
- Laurie Norwood – bass (2006–?)
- Fiachra Shanks – mandolin, guitar, banjo (2008 & 2009)
- Ben Gunnery – fiddle (2009)
- Jim McAllister – bass, backing vocals (2009–2012)
- Dave Allen – fiddle, mandolin, vocals (2009–2013)
- Whiskey Mick Rowan – mandolin, vocals (2009–2013)
- Ian Bramble – guitar, vocals (2012–2013)
- Greg Courtney – bass, vocals (2012–2013)

=== Associated musicians ===
- Brian "Robo" Robertson – guest guitar (The Snake), producer (Christmas Party E.P. '96, My Way)
- Dave Jordan – producer (Church of the Holy Spook EP, The Snake), live sound
- Ed Deane – lap steel & Spanish guitar on The Crock of Gold; occasional live performance
- Gerry Diver – fiddle on Outlaw Heaven and New Church
- Joey Cashman – manager, occasional whistle (live)
- Johnny Depp – guest guitar ("That Woman's Got Me Drinking"), plus some live promo performances (including Top of the Pops), director (video for "That Woman's Got Me Drinking")
- Miriam Kavana - fiddle on Holloway Boulevard, occasional live
- Ron Kavana – member of an early line-up, played guitar on "Haunted", wrote melody for "Snake with Eyes of Garnet"
- Sarge O'Hara – piano, producer, co-wrote "Sleepless Nights"
- Siobhan MacGowan – Shane's sister, occasional duet part on "Fairytale of New York" (live), backing vocals (live)
- Spider Stacy – guest whistle (The Snake), guest vocals (Holloway Boulevard), whistle on some live dates in 1998
- Teressa MacGowan – Shane's mother, occasional duet part on "Fairytale of New York" (live) (Across the Broad Atlantic)

== Discography ==
=== Shane MacGowan and the Popes ===
==== Albums ====
- The Snake (October 1994) (studio #1)
- The Crock of Gold (October 1997) (studio #2)
- The Rare Oul' Stuff (2001 / January 2002) (a best-of collection of B-sides and key album tracks spanning the years 1994 to 1998)
- Across the Broad Atlantic: Live on Paddy's Day – New York and Dublin (February 2002) (live #1)

==== EPs ====
- The Church of the Holy Spook (1994)
- My Way (1996)
- Christmas Party EP (1996)

==== Video ====
- Live at Montreux 1995 (November 2004)

=== The Popes ===
==== Albums ====
- Holloway Boulevard (March 2000) (studio #3; including three tracks written by Shane MacGowan)
- Release the Beast (Live in London 2003) (August 2004) (live #2; a two-disc set including a live album recorded in 2003 at The Hammersmith & Fulham Irish Centre in London as disc 1 and a re-release of Holloway Boulevard as disc 2)
- Outlaw Heaven (May 2009) (studio #4; including special guest Shane MacGowan on three tracks)
- New Church (March 2012) (studio #5)

==== Singles ====
- Are You Looking at Me? (1998)
- Holloway Boulevard (1999)
- Bastards (2010)
