= Kirsty MacColl discography =

- Studio albums: 5
- Compilation albums: 12
- Singles: 35
- Box sets: 3

This is the discography of British singer-songwriter Kirsty MacColl.

== Albums ==
=== Studio albums ===
Title	Album details	Peak chart positions				Certifications
Title	Album details	UK	AUS	NL	SWE	Certifications
Desperate Character	Released: June 1981; Label: Polydor; Formats: LP, MC, CD (2012)	—	—	44	—	
Kite	Released: 8 May 1989; Label: Virgin; Formats: CD, LP, MC	34	110	—	48	UK: Silver
Electric Landlady	Released: 24 June 1991; Label: Virgin; Formats: CD, LP, MC	17	86	—	—	
Titanic Days	Released: 5 October 1993; Label: I.R.S., ZTT; Formats: CD, MC, LP (2024)	47	187	—	—	
Tropical Brainstorm	Released: 20 March 2000; Label: V2; Formats: CD, LP (2021)	39	—	—	—	UK: Gold
Real	Released: 27 October 2023 (Recorded 1983; Previously Unreleased); Label: Polydor; Formats: Streaming (also included in the See That Girl box set)	—	—	—	—	
"—" denotes releases that did not chart or were not released in that territory.

=== Compilation albums ===
Title	Album details	Peak chart positions	Certifications
Title	Album details	UK	Certifications
Kirsty MacColl	Released: March 1985; Label: Polydor; Formats: LP, MC; Re-worked version of Desperate Character	—	
The Essential Collection	Released: 1993; Label: Stiff; Formats: CD	—	
Galore – The Best of Kirsty MacColl	Released: 6 March 1995; Label: Virgin; Formats: CD, MC	6	UK: Gold
What Do Pretty Girls Do?	Released: February 1998; Label: Hux; Formats: CD; Live sessions from BBC Radio 1	—	
The One and Only	Released: 6 August 2001; Label: Metro; Formats: CD, MC	—	
The Best of Kirsty MacColl	Released: 1 August 2005; Label: EMI; Formats: CD	12	UK: Gold
The Stiff Singles	Released: 19 December 2005; Label: Stiff; Formats: digital download	—	
The Stiff Singles Collection	Released: 4 October 2006; Label: Stiff; Formats: CD; Japan-only release	—	
The Collection	Released: 8 September 2008; Label: EMI Gold; Formats: CD	—	
A New England: The Very Best of Kirsty MacColl	Released: 25 February 2013; Label: Union Square Music; Formats: CD, CD+DVD	41	
All I Ever Wanted: The Anthology	Released: 7 April 2014; Label: Salvo; Formats: 2xCD	—	
Other People's Hearts (B.Sides 1988-1989)	Released: 29 August 2020; Label: Demon; Formats: LP; Collection of B-sides from Kite	—	
Free World: The Best Of 1979-2000	Released: 19 January 2024; Label: Demon; Formats: LP; First ever Kirsty MacColl vinyl compilation	— (Note: Reached #9 in UK Vinyl Albums chart, #11 in UK Independent Albums chart, #21 in UK Physical Albums Chart, #23 in UK Album Sales chart and #25 in Scottish Albums Chart)	
"—" denotes releases that did not chart or were not released in that territory.

=== Box sets ===
Title	Album details	Peak chart positions
Title	Album details	UK
From Croydon to Cuba: An Anthology	Released: 28 March 2005; Label: Virgin/EMI; Formats: 3xCD	98
Days (1989–1991)	Released: 15 June 2018; Label: Edsel; Formats: 4xCD+DVD	—
See That Girl 1979–2000	Released: 27 October 2023; Label: Universal Music Recordings; Formats: 8xCD Artbook.; Collection of music spanning her career, including the unreleased album Real	— (Note: Charted at number 49 on the UK Physical Albums chart and number 51 on the UK Album Sales chart)
"—" denotes releases that did not chart.

== Singles ==
Title	Year	Peak chart positions									Certifications	Album
Title	Year	UK	AUS	BEL (FL)	GER	IRE	NL	NZ	SWE	US Alt	Certifications	Album
"They Don't Know"	1979	— (Note: This single did not enter the UK Singles Chart, but did reach number 62 on the Record Business Singles Chart.)	—	—	—	—	—	—	—	—		Non-album single
"Keep Your Hands Off My Baby"	1981	— (Note: This single did not enter the UK Singles Chart, but did reach number 123 on the Record Business Singles Chart.)	—	—	—	—	—	—	—	—		
"There's a Guy Works Down the Chip Shop Swears He's Elvis"	1981	14	—	37	—	9	31	—	13	—		Desperate Character
"See That Girl"	1981	— (Note: This single did not enter the UK Singles Chart, but did reach number 45 on the Record Business Airplay Guide.)	—	—	—	—	—	—	—	—		Desperate Character
"You Still Believe in Me"	1981	—	—	—	—	—	—	—	—	—		Non-album single
"I Want Out" (Matchbox featuring MacColl)	1983	137	—	—	58	—	(Note: "I Want Out" did not chart in the Dutch Single Top 100, but spent 3 weeks in the Single Tip charts.)	—	—	—		Crossed Line (Matchbox album)
"Terry"	1983	82	—	34	—	—	43	—	—	—		Non-album singles
"A New England"	1984	7	—	—	—	8	(Note: "A New England" did not chart in the Dutch Single Top 100, but spent 4 weeks in the Single Tip charts.)	—	18	—		Non-album singles
"He's on the Beach"	1985	109	—	—	—	—	—	—	—	—		Non-album singles
"Greetings to the New Brunette" (with Billy Bragg and Johnny Marr)	1986	58	—	—	—	—	—	6	—	—		Talking with the Taxman About Poetry (Billy Bragg album)
"Fairytale of New York" (The Pogues featuring MacColl) (Note: Since 2005, "Fairytale of New York" has reached the UK top 20 every year, including peaking at number 4 six times (in 2007, and every year 2018-2021, and 2023), number 5 in 2017, and number 6 in 2006.)	1987	2	—	—	—	1	—	5	—	—	NZ: 3× Platinum	If I Should Fall from Grace with God (Pogues album)
"Free World"	1989	43	162	—	—	—	—	—	—	—		Kite
"Days"	1989	12	—	45	—	9	—	—	—	—		Kite
"Innocence"	1989	80	—	—	—	—	—	—	—	—		Kite
"Don't Come the Cowboy with Me Sonny Jim!"	1990	82	—	—	—	—	—	—	—	—		Kite
"Miss Otis Regrets"/"Just One of Those Things" (with the Pogues)	1990	85	—	—	—	—	—	—	—	—		Red Hot + Blue
"Walking Down Madison"	1991	23	58	—	—	12	85	—	—	4		Electric Landlady
"My Affair"	1991	56	—	—	—	—	—	—	—	—		Electric Landlady
"All I Ever Wanted"	1991	91	154	—	—	—	—	—	—	—		Electric Landlady
"Fairytale of New York" (The Pogues featuring MacColl; reissue)	1991	36	—	—	—	10	—	—	—	—		The Best of the Pogues
"Titanic Days" (US-only release)	1993	—	—	—	—	—	—	—	—	—		Titanic Days
"Can't Stop Killing You" (Australia and US-only release)	1993	—	131	—	—	—	—	—	—	20		Titanic Days
"Angel"	1993	87	228	—	—	—	—	—	—	26		Titanic Days
"Caroline"	1995	58	—	—	—	—	—	—	—	—		Galore – The Best of Kirsty MacColl
"Perfect Day" (with Evan Dando)	1995	75	—	—	—	—	—	—	—	—		Galore – The Best of Kirsty MacColl
"Days" (reissue)	1995	42	—	—	—	—	—	—	—	—		Non-album single (Note: "Days" was reissued after its use in a TV advert for the Sony Handycam.)
"Mambo de la Luna"	1999	89	—	—	—	—	—	—	—	—		Tropical Brainstorm
"In These Shoes?"	2000	81	—	—	—	—	—	—	—	—		Tropical Brainstorm
"Sun on the Water"	2005	—	—	—	—	—	—	—	—	—		The Best of Kirsty MacColl
"Fairytale of New York" (The Pogues featuring MacColl; 2nd reissue)	2005	3	45	—	61	3	74	—	14	—	UK: 5× Platinum	The Best of Kirsty MacColl
"Fairytale of New York" (The Pogues featuring MacColl; 3rd reissue)	2012	12	—	—	—	9	—	37	22	—	—	Non-album single
"Lullaby for Ezra"	2023	—	—	—	—	—	—	—	—	—		Real
"You Caught Me Out"	2023	— (Note: "You Caught Me Out" did not enter the UK Singles Chart Top 100, but debuted and peaked at number 5 on the UK Vinyl Singles Chart, at number 6 on the UK Physical Singles Chart, and at number 58 on the UK Singles Sales Chart.)	—	—	—	—	—	—	—	—	—	See That Girl 1979–2000
"Fairytale of New York" (The Pogues featuring MacColl; 4th reissue)	2023	4	—	—	—	1	—	—	12	—	—	Non-album single
"—" denotes releases that did not chart or were not released in that territory.
