= See That Girl 1979–2000 =

Box set by Kirsty MacColl
- Released: 27 October 2023
- Recorded: 1979–2000
- Genre: Pop; rock; country; folk; world music
- Length: 10h 12m
- Label: Universal Music Recordings

Kirsty MacColl chronology
Other People's Hearts (B.Sides 1988–1989) (2020)	See That Girl 1979–2000 (2023)	Real (2023)

See That Girl 1979–2000 is an eight disc box set by the British singer and songwriter Kirsty MacColl, released by Universal Music Group in 2023. The set contains 161 songs, recorded between 1979 and 2000, featuring 47 previously unreleased tracks, including the entirety of her 1983 unreleased second album Real, and sleeve notes by Jude Rogers. It reached number 49 on the UK Physical Albums chart and number 97 on the Scottish Albums Chart.

== Reception ==
Professional ratings
Review scores
Source	Rating
AllMusic	4.5/5 stars
Classic Pop	4/5 stars
Daily Express	5/5 stars
Record Collector	4/5 stars
Super Deluxe Edition	4.7/5 stars
Uncut	9/10

Upon release, Alexis Petridis of The Guardian described the set as "lavish", and added "MacColl remains a more complex figure than her everywoman public image suggested".

Bob Mehr of The New York Times commented: "The release of See That Girl has given MacColl's friends and fans an opportunity to reassess her musical legacy, as well as consider what might have been."

Record Collector noted that "It's a voyage that stops off at vintage girl group tropes, ironic country, indie guitar anthems, trip-hop and salsa, all underpinned by an impossibly attractive and very English conversational vocal style." The Daily Express gave the set 5 stars, and described it as "a huge overview of a talented singer-songwriter".

== Track listing ==
Adapted from the box set liner notes.

=== Disc one: The Singles ===
No.	Title	Writer(s)	Origin	Length
1.	"They Don't Know"	Kirsty MacColl	Non-album single, 1979	3:02
2.	"Keep Your Hands off My Baby"	Carole King, Gerry Goffin	Non-album single, 1981	2:58
3.	"There's a Guy Works Down the Chip Shop Swears He's Elvis"	MacColl, Philip Rambow	Desperate Character, 1981	3:08
4.	"See That Girl"	MacColl	Desperate Character	2:57
5.	"You Still Believe in Me"	Brian Wilson, Tony Asher	Non-album single, 1981	2:57
6.	"Terry"	MacColl, Gavin Povey	Non-album single, 1983	3:56
7.	"A New England"	Billy Bragg	Non-album single, 1984	3:50
8.	"He's on the Beach"	MacColl, Povey	Non-album single, 1985	3:29
9.	"Fairytale of New York" (The Pogues featuring Kirsty MacColl)	Shane MacGowan, Jem Finer	Single, 1987; If I Should Fall from Grace with God, 1988	4:31
10.	"Free World" (radio version)	MacColl	Kite, 1989	2:38
11.	"Days"	Ray Davies	Kite	2:59
12.	"Innocence" (single remix)	MacColl, Pete Glenister	Kite	4:02
13.	"Don't Come the Cowboy with Me, Sonny Jim"	MacColl	Kite	3:47
14.	"Walking Down Madison" (7" mix)	MacColl, Johnny Marr	Electric Landlady, 1991	4:40
15.	"My Affair" (radio edit)	MacColl, Nevin	Electric Landlady	3:34
16.	"All I Ever Wanted" (single edit)	MacColl, Marshall Crenshaw	Non-album single, 1991; original version from Electric Landlady	3:31
17.	"Angel" (single version)	MacColl	Titanic Days, 1993	3:40
18.	"Caroline"	MacColl	Galore, 1995	2:57
19.	"Perfect Day" (Kirsty MacColl and Evan Dando)	Lou Reed	Galore	3:50
20.	"Mambo de la Luna" (single version)	David Ruffy, MacColl, Glenister	Tropical Brainstorm, 2000	3:31
21.	"In These Shoes?"	MacColl, Glenister	Tropical Brainstorm	3:39

=== Disc two: 1979–1983 ===
No.	Title	Writer(s)	Length
1.	"Turn My Motor On"	MacColl	2:27
2.	"I Don't Need You"	MacColl, Rambow	2:56
3.	"There's a Guy Works Down the Truck Stop Swears He's Elvis"	MacColl, Rambow	3:08
4.	"Nothing to Do" (The Clock Goes Round Demo)	MacColl	2:19
5.	"Falling for Faces" (Demo)	MacColl, Lu Edmonds	2:25
6.	"The Real Ripper" (Demo)	MacColl, Edmonds	4:08
7.	"Teenager in Love"	MacColl	2:57
8.	"Mexican Sofa"	MacColl, Edmonds	3:14
9.	"Until the Night"	MacColl, Phil Johnstone	3:14
10.	"Over You"	MacColl	2:35
11.	"Queen of the High Teas"	MacColl	2:27
12.	"Bad Dreams"	MacColl	4:48
13.	"Time"	MacColl	3:45
14.	"Sticked and Stoned"	MacColl	3:46
15.	"Annie"	MacColl	4:37
16.	"Camel Crossing"	MacColl	5:21
17.	"Berlin"	MacColl	3:34
18.	"Man with No Name"	MacColl	3:37
19.	"Lullaby for Ezra"	MacColl, Edmonds	3:50
20.	"Up the Grey Stairs"	MacColl	6:38
21.	"Roman Gardens"	Gavin Povey, Hamish MacColl	4:58

=== Disc three: 1983–1989 ===
No.	Title	Writer(s)	Length
1.	"Terry" (extended version)	MacColl, Povey	5:20
2.	"Quietly Alone"	MacColl	2:39
3.	"One Little Lie" (Demo)	MacColl	4:08
4.	"A New England" (extended version)	Bragg	7:57
5.	"Patrick"	MacColl	3:09
6.	"I'm Going Out with an Eighty Year Old Millionaire"	MacColl	2:55
7.	"Trouble with People" (Demo)	MacColl, Simon Climie	3:03
8.	"Man of Steel" (Demo)	MacColl, Climie	2:53
9.	"He's on the Beach" (extended version)	MacColl, Povey	8:08
10.	"Please, Go to Sleep"	MacColl	2:33
11.	"You Just Haven't Earned it Yet, Baby" (She's Having a Baby version)	Johnny Marr, Steven Morrissey	3:49
12.	"Closer to God"	MacColl	3:53
13.	"The End of a Perfect Day" (original demo version)	MacColl, Marr	3:12
14.	"La Forêt de Mimosas"	MacColl	3:36
15.	"Fifteen Minutes"	MacColl	3:12
16.	"What Do Pretty Girls Do?"	MacColl, Pete Glenister	2:37
17.	"Dancing in Limbo"	MacColl	2:51
18.	"You and Me Baby"	MacColl, Marr	2:31
19.	"Happy"	MacColl	2:33
20.	"El Paso"	Marty Robbins	3:46
21.	"Still Life"	MacColl, Rambow	2:57

=== Disc four: 1989–1992 ===
No.	Title	Writer(s)	Length
1.	"Innocence" (The Guilt Mix)	MacColl, Glenister	5:54
2.	"No Heroes" (Guitar Heroes Mix)	MacColl	4:23
3.	"Clubland"	MacColl	4:04
4.	"Other Peoples Hearts"	MacColl, Povey	3:37
5.	"One Good Thing"	MacColl, Glenister	3:37
6.	"He Never Mentioned Love"	MacColl, Jem Finer	3:50
7.	"The Hardest Word"	Kirsty MacColl, Hamish MacColl	4:38
8.	"My Way Home"	MacColl, Glenister	4:30
9.	"My Affair" (Olive Groove Mix)	MacColl, Nevin	6:26
10.	"All the Tears That I Cried"	MacColl, Nevin	3:31
11.	"A New England" (Live at Glastonbury 22 June 1992)	Bragg	3:55
12.	"Innocence" (Live at Glastonbury 22 June 1992)	MacColl, Glenister	4:26
13.	"You Just Haven't Earned It Yet, Baby" (Live at Glastonbury 22 June 1992)	Marr, Morrisey	3:28
14.	"Fifteen Minutes / Don't Come The Cowboy With Me, Sonny Jim" (Live at Glastonbury 22 June 1992)	MacColl	5:53
15.	"Happy" (Live at Glastonbury 22 June 1992)	MacColl	2:57
16.	"Tread Lightly" (Live at Glastonbury 22 June 1992)	MacColl, Pete Glenister	3:29
17.	"Train in Vain / Walking Down Madison" (Live at Glastonbury 22 June 1992)	Joe Strummer, Mick Jones, Paul Simonon, Topper Headon / Kirsty MacColl, Johnny Marr	7:24
18.	"Free World" (Live at Glastonbury 22 June 1992)	MacColl	3:12
19.	"There's a Guy Works Down the Chip Shop Swears He's Elvis" (Live at Glastonbury 22 June 1992)	MacColl, Rambow	4:00

=== Disc five: 1993–1996 ===
No.	Title	Writer(s)	Length
1.	"Soho Square"	MacColl	4:25
2.	"Last Day of Summer"	MacColl, Nevin	4:20
3.	"Can't Stop Killing You"	MacColl, Marr	4:10
4.	"Titanic Days"	MacColl, Nevin	5:43
5.	"Big Boy on a Saturday Night"	MacColl, Nevin	3:56
6.	"Angel" (Stuart Crichton Piano Edit)	MacColl	3:17
7.	"King Kong" (Demo)	MacColl, Nevin	3:56
8.	"Dear John" (Demo)	MacColl, Nevin	2:43
9.	"Fabulous Garden"	MacColl	3:13
10.	"Touch Me"	MacColl, Glenister	3:26
11.	"Free World" (Live At Belly Up, Solana Beach, California 1 December 1993)	MacColl	2:43
12.	"Miss Otis Regrets" (Live at Belly Up, Solana Beach, California 1 December 1993)	Cole Porter	3:01
13.	"Irish Cousin"	MacColl, Nevin	4:49
14.	"The Butcher Boy"	Traditional, arranged by Kirsty MacColl	3:57
15.	"As Long as You Hold Me" (Electric Version)	Bragg	4:39
16.	"Eu Só Quero Um Xodó"	Anastacia/Jose Domingos de Moraes	3:33
17.	"In These Shoes?" (Demo)	MacColl, Glenister	3:40
18.	"Things Happen" (Demo)	MacColl, Graham Gouldman	2:58
19.	"Treachery a.k.a Stalking a Fan" (Demo)	MacColl, Gouldman	3:01
20.	"Siempre Tu Rosa" (Always Your Rose)	MacColl, Claudio Guidetti	2:35

=== Disc six: 1999–2000 ===
No.	Title	Writer(s)	Length
1.	"Mambo de la Luna" (Mint Royale Mix)	MacColl, Glenister, Dave Ruffy, Louis Martinez	5:36
2.	"In These Shoes?" (UR Crazy Remix)	MacColl, Ruffy, Glenister	6:04
3.	"Good for Me"	MacColl, James Knight	3:11
4.	"Autumngirlsoup"	MacColl	3:54
5.	"Us Amazonians"	MacColl, Glenister	4:09
6.	"Nao Esperando"	MacColl, Glenister	4:04
7.	"Wrong Again"	MacColl	4:14
8.	"I Believe in Love"	MacColl, Philip Chevron	2:47
9.	"Sun on the Water" (Demo)	MacColl, Glenister	5:20
10.	"Here Comes That Man Again" (Live at the Jazz Café, London 12 October 1999)	MacColl, Glenister	5:20
11.	"Head" (LLive at the Jazz Café, London 12 October 1999)	MacColl	4:26
12.	"Celestine" (Live at the Jazz Café, London 12 October 1999)	MacColl	3:45
13.	"England 2 Colombia 0" (Live at the Jazz Café, London 12 October 1999)	MacColl	4:11
14.	"Designer Life" (Live at the Jazz Café, London 12 October 1999)	MacColl, Guidetti, Ken Crouch	2:40
15.	"Days" (Live at the Jazz Café, London 12 October 1999)	Davies	3:25
16.	"Walking Down Madison" (Live at the Jazz Café, London 12 October 1999)	MacColl, Marr	6:25
17.	"How Insensitive" (Live at the Jazz Café, London 12 October 1999)	Antonio Carlos Jobim, Norman Gimbel, Vincius De Moraes	3:08
18.	"My Affair" (Live at the Jazz Café, London 12 October 1999)	MacColl, Nevin	8:30

=== Disc seven: BBC Recordings 1981–2000 ===
No.	Title	Writer(s)	Show	Length
1.	"I Don't Wanna Play House"	Bill Sherrill, Glenn Sutton	Something Else, BBC TV 23.10.1981	3:35
2.	"Queen of the High Teas"	MacColl	Something Else, BBC TV 23.10.1981
3.	"You Can Have My Husband"	Dorothy LaBostrie	Something Else, BBC TV 23.10.1981	3:16
4.	"Don't Come the Cowboy with Me Sonny Jim!"	MacColl	BBC Radio 1 Session for Nicky Campbell, 08.11.1989	3:41
5.	"What Do Pretty Girls Do?"	MacColl, Glenister	BBC Radio 1 Session for Nicky Campbell, 08.11.1989	2:36
6.	"Don't Run Away from Me Now"	MacColl, Rambow	BBC Radio 1 Session for Nicky Campbell, 08.11.1989	2:56
7.	"Still Life"	MacColl, Rambow	BBC Radio 1 Session for Nicky Campbell, 08.11.1989	3:05
8.	"There's a Guy Works Down the Chip Shop Swears He's Elvis"	MacColl, Rambow	BBC Radio 1 Session for Nicky Campbell, 26.06.1991	3:55
9.	"Walk Right Back"	Sonny Curtis	BBC Radio 1 Session for Nicky Campbell, 26.06.1991	3:47
10.	"Darling, Let's Have Another Baby"	Fred Berk	BBC Radio 1 Session for Nicky Campbell, 26.06.1991
11.	"Angel"	MacColl	Later... BBC TV 19.11.1992	4:10
12.	"Can't Stop Killing You"	MacColl, Marr	BBC Greater London Radio Session for Peter Curran, 07.03.1994	3:54
13.	"Soho Square"	MacColl, Nevin	BBC Greater London Radio Session for Peter Curran, 07.03.1994	4:13
14.	"Bad"	MacColl	BBC Greater London Radio Session For Peter Curran, 07.03.1994	1:56
15.	"My Affair"	MacColl, Nevin	BBC Radio 1 Session for Simon Mayo, 07.03.1994	3:44
16.	"Miss Otis Regrets" (Kirsty MacColl with the 1st Battalion Irish Guards)	Porter	Later... BBC TV 31.12.1994	3:13
17.	"Caroline"	MacColl	BBC Greater London Radio Session for Peter Curran, 16.02.1995	2:55
18.	"Free World"	MacColl	BBC Greater London Radio Session for Peter Curran, 16.02.1995	2:46
19.	"A New England (Acoustic)" (Kirsty MacColl with Pete Glenister)	Bragg	BBC Radio 1 Session for Kevin Greening, 20.02.1995	3:29
20.	"He's on the Beach"	MacColl, Povey	BBC Radio 1 Session For Kevin Greening, 20.02.1995
21.	"Tread Lightly"	MacColl, Glenister	Live at the Fleadh, Finsbury Park 10.06.1995	4:18
22.	"I Wanna Be Sedated"	Douglas Colvin, Jeffrey Hyman, John Cummings	Live at the Fleadh, Finsbury Park 10.06.1995	2:09
23.	"In These Shoes?"	MacColl, Lastie, Glenister, Correa	Later... BBC TV 15.04.2000	3:57

=== Disc eight: Other People's Songs ===
No.	Title	Writer(s)	Artist	Length
1.	"Darling Annie"	Peggy Seeger	Peggy Seeger	4:09
2.	"Breaking Down the Walls of Heartache"	Denny Randell, Sandy Linzer	Jane Aire & the Belvederes	2:54
3.	"Shutting the Doors"	Kirsty MacColl, Alan Lee Shaw	Jools Holland and Kirsty MacColl	4:22
4.	"You Broke My Heart in 17 Places"	MacColl	Tracey Ullman	2:49
5.	"Greetings to the New Brunette"	Bragg	Billy Bragg with Johnny Marr and Kirsty MacColl	3:30
6.	"Make Believe Mambo (Orisa)"	David Byrne	David Byrne	5:23
7.	"The Manchester Rambler"	Ewan MacColl	Ewan MacColl	4:42
8.	"Hallelujah" (MacColl Mix)	Gary Whelan, Mark Day, Paul Davis, Paul Ryder, Shaun Ryder	Happy Mondays	2:39
9.	"Invisible to You"	Pete Glenister, Scott Wilk	Mary Coughlan	4:28
10.	"Wishing You Were Here"	Alison Moyet, Glenister	Alison Moyet	3:57
11.	"Boyfriend '65"	Holly Johnson	Holly Johnson	3:08
12.	"Darling, Let's Have Another Baby"	Fred Berk	Kirsty MacColl and Billy Bragg	3:26
13.	"Welcome to the Cheap Seats" (Naked Mix)	Malcolm Treece, Martin Bell, Martin Gilks, Miles Hunt, Paul Clifford	The Wonder Stuff	2:41
14.	"Song for Someone"	Brian Kenealy, Canice Kenealy, Edward Byrne, Emmaline Duffy Fallon, Kenneth Rice	Engine Alley	3:46
15.	"Red Jeans"	Anthony Thistlethwaite	Anthony Thistlethwaite	2:44
16.	"Libertango"	Astor Piazzolla, Barry Reynolds, Dennis Wilkey, Grace Jones, Nathalie Delon	Sharon Shannon and Kirsty MacColl	4:23
17.	"People Uniting"	Chucho Merchan, Scobie Ryder	Chucho Merchan	5:05
18.	"Sail Away"	Randy Newman	Ghostland and Kirsty MacColl	3:14

== Credits ==
Adapted from the box set liner notes.

- Written By – Kirsty MacColl (tracks: 1-1, 1–3, 1–4, 1–6, 1–8, 1–10, 1–12 to 1–18, 1-20, 1-21, 2–1 to 2-20, 3–1 to 3-3, 3–5 to 3–10, 3–12 to 3–19, 3-21, 4–1 to 4–10, 4–12, 4–14 to 4–19, 5–1 to 5–11, 5–13, 5–14, 5–17 to 5-20, 6–1 to 6–14, 6–16, 6–18, 7–2, 7–4 to 7–8, 7–11 to 7–15, 7–17, 7–18, 7-20, 7-21, 7-23, 8–3, 8–4)
- Producer – Alison Moyet (tracks: 8–10), Andy Roberts (8) (tracks: 5–15), Baboon Farm (tracks: 5–1 to 5-5, 5–9, 5–10), Barry 'Bazza' Farmer* (tracks: 1–2 to 1–5, 2-2, 2–3, 2–7 to 2–9, 2–11), Boz Boorer (tracks: 1–19, 5–13, 5–14), Chris Whatmough (tracks: 7–19, 7-20), Colin Stuart (tracks: 3–19 to 3-21), Dave Jordan (tracks: 2–12 to 2-21), Dave Ruffy* (tracks: 1-20, 1-21, 6–1, 6–2, 6–4 to 6–7), Gavin Povey (tracks: 3–1, 3–2, 8–4), Johnny Marr (tracks: 3–19), Kirsty MacColl (tracks: 1–6, 1–18, 1–19 to 1-21, 2–10, 3–1, 3–2, 3–5, 3–6, 3-20, 3-21, 5–7, 5–8, 5–13, 5–14, 6–1, 6–2, 6–4 to 6–7, 8–4), Liam Sternberg (tracks: 1-1, 2–1), Mark E Nevin (tracks: 5–7, 5–8), Pete Glenister (tracks: 1-20, 1-21, 6–1, 6–2, 6–4 to 6–7, 6–9), Peter Watts (tracks: 7–4 to 7–10), Steve Lillywhite (tracks: 1–7 to 1–17, 3–4, 3–9 to 3–18, 4–1 to 4–10, 5–6, 8–14), Vic Van Vugt* (tracks: 1–18, 5–1 to 5-5, 5–9, 5–10)
- Producer [Additional Production] – Mint Royale (tracks: 6–1)
- Producer, Mixed By – Peter Kaye (tracks: 5–11, 5–12)
- Engineer – Phil Bodger (tracks: 2–12 to 2-21)
- Mixed By – Jeremy Wheatley (tracks: 6–1), Pete Glenister (tracks: 6–9)
- Recorded By – Kirsty MacColl (tracks: 5–16, 5–17), Pete Glenister (tracks: 5–16, 5–17)
- Remix – Colin Stuart (tracks: 4–1), Fred Defaye (tracks: 4–1, 4–3), Steve Lillywhite (tracks: 4–2)
- Remix, Producer [Additional Production] – UR Production (tracks: 6–2)
- Remix, Producer [Additional] – Howard Gray (tracks: 4–9)
- Arranged By – Kirsty MacColl (tracks: 5–14)
- Sleeve Notes – Jude Rogers

== Charts ==
Chart (2023)	Peak position
Scottish Albums (OCC)	97
UK Albums Sales (OCC)	51
UK Physical Albums (OCC)	49
