= From Croydon to Cuba: An Anthology =

Box set by Kirsty MacColl
- Released: 2005
- Recorded: 1979–2000
- Genres: Pop; rock; country; folk; world music
- Length: 3:56:23
- Label: Virgin

Kirsty MacColl chronology
The One and Only (2001)	From Croydon to Cuba: An Anthology (2005)	The Stiff Years (2005)

From Croydon to Cuba: An Anthology is a three disc box set by the British singer and songwriter Kirsty MacColl, released by Virgin in 2005. It reached No. 98 on the UK Albums Chart.

== Reception ==
Professional ratings
Review scores
Source	Rating
AllMusic	4.5/5 stars
musicOMH	favourable
The Telegraph	favourable

Upon release, Dave Thompson of AllMusic described the set as a "marvel" and one which leaves listeners "wondering precisely how MacColl's genius passed so many people by". John Murphy of musicOMH considered it a "long overdue retrospective" and summarised: "Although there are some omissions, this anthology is still a compulsory purchase for anyone who wants to know more about one of the more cruelly over-looked figures of British music."

Robert Sandall of The Telegraph commented: "This box set offers a comprehensive reminder of just how characterful a talent departed the planet when Kirsty MacColl [died] in 2000. Not all of the 65 tracks here are classics - like most box sets, this contains a sprinkling of rare or unreleased what-nots which collectors love but others skip. But the story they tell is riveting."

== Track listing ==
Adapted from the box set liner notes.

=== Disc one ===
No.	Title	Writer(s)	Origin	Length
1.	"They Don't Know"	Kirsty MacColl	Non-album single, 1979	3:02
2.	"You Caught Me Out"	MacColl, Pete Briquette, Simon Crowe	Abandoned single, 1979; (Note: Shortly before its October 1979 release date, MacColl and her label Stiff parted company, so "You Caught Me Out" was not commercially released as a single at that time. Test pressings and white label promos exist.) previously unreleased	3:24
3.	"Keep Your Hands off My Baby"	Carole King, Gerry Goffin	Non-album single, 1981	2:59
4.	"There's a Guy Works Down the Chip Shop Swears He's Elvis"	MacColl, Philip Rambow	Desperate Character, 1981	3:08
5.	"Hard to Believe"	MacColl	Desperate Character	2:19
6.	"See That Girl"	MacColl	Desperate Character	3:00
7.	"Queen of the High Teas"	MacColl	B-side of "You Still Believe in Me", 1981	2:28
8.	"I Want Out" (Matchbox feat. Kirsty MacColl)	Brian Hodgson, Ray Peters, Tony Colton	Crossed Line, 1982	2:42
9.	"You Still Believe in Me"	Brian Wilson, Tony Asher	Non-album single, 1981	2:57
10.	"Rhythm of the Real Thing"	MacColl, Simon Climie	B-side of "Berlin", 1983 (Note: This track was referenced as being issued as a 1983 single (as a B-side) in this album's liner notes, but no actual copy -- whether a stock copy, promo copy, test pressing or acetate -- has ever surfaced.)	4:58
11.	"Berlin"	MacColl	Non-album single, 1983 (Note: This track was referenced as being issued as a 1983 single A-side in this album's liner notes, but no actual copy -- whether a stock copy, promo copy, test pressing or acetate -- has ever surfaced.)	3:34
12.	"Camel Crossing"	MacColl	From the Real sessions, 1983; (Note: Recorded January 1983 during sessions for MacColl's shelved second album Real.) previously unreleased	5:21
13.	"Roman Gardens"	Hamish MacColl, Gavin Povey	Kirsty MacColl, 1985; from the Real sessions	4:57
14.	"Sticked and Stoned"	MacColl	From the Real sessions; previously unreleased	3:46
15.	"Terry"	MacColl, Povey	Non-album single, 1983	3:51
16.	"A New England"	Billy Bragg	Non-album single, 1984	3:48
17.	"Patrick"	MacColl	B-side of "A New England"	3:04
18.	"He's on the Beach"	MacColl, Povey	Non-album single, 1985	3:30
19.	"Innocence" (Single remix)	MacColl, Pete Glenister	Kite, 1989	4:02
20.	"Don't Come The Cowboy With Me, Sonny Jim"	MacColl	Kite	3:46
21.	"Closer to God"	MacColl	B-side of "Free World", 1989	3:54
22.	"Fairytale of New York" (The Pogues feat. Kirsty MacColl)	Shane MacGowan, Jem Finer	Single, 1987; If I Should Fall from Grace with God, 1988	4:33
Total length:				79:14

=== Disc two ===
No.	Title	Writer(s)	Origin	Length
1.	"Free World"	MacColl	Kite	2:37
2.	"You Just Haven't Earned It Yet, Baby"	Morrissey, Johnny Marr	Kite	2:49
3.	"Tread Lightly"	MacColl, Glenister	Kite	3:17
4.	"The End of a Perfect Day"	MacColl, Marr	Kite	3:21
5.	"Mother's Ruin"	MacColl, Glenister	Kite	3:55
6.	"Dancing in Limbo"	MacColl	Kite	2:51
7.	"Days"	Ray Davies	Kite	3:55
8.	"Still Life"	MacColl, Rambow	B-side of "Days", 1989	2:51
9.	"Clubland"	MacColl	B-side of "Innocence", 1989	2:59
10.	"Other People's Hearts"	MacColl, Povey	B-side of "Don't Come The Cowboy With Me, Sonny Jim", 1990	2:59
11.	"Don't Run Away from Me Now"	MacColl, Rambow	B-side of "Innocence", 1989	4:04
12.	"Please Help Me, I'm Falling"	Don Robertson, Hal Blair	B-side of "Days", 1989	3:36
13.	"Miss Otis Regrets/Just One of Those Things" (Kirsty MacColl and the Pogues)	Cole Porter	Red Hot + Blue, 1990	2:58
14.	"All the Tears That I Cried"	MacColl, Mark E. Nevin	B-side of "My Affair", 1991	2:45
15.	"Walking Down Madison"	MacColl, Marr	Electric Landlady, 1991	4:39
16.	"London Bridge Is Falling Down"	Winsford Devine, add. lyrics by MacColl	Outtake from the Electric Landlady sessions, 1991; previously unreleased	4:52
17.	"My Affair"	MacColl, Nevin	Electric Landlady	5:23
18.	"All I Ever Wanted" (Re-recorded single version)	MacColl, Marshall Crenshaw	Non-album single, 1991; original version from Electric Landlady	3:38
19.	"Halloween"	MacColl, Nevin	Electric Landlady	3:39
20.	"We'll Never Pass This Way Again"	MacColl	Electric Landlady	4:20
21.	"Count On Me" (Demo)	MacColl, Nevin	1993 demo; previously unreleased	2:39
22.	"Dear John" (Demo)	MacColl, Nevin	1993 demo; previously unreleased	2:43
Total length:				78:17

=== Disc three ===
No.	Title	Writer(s)	Origin	Length
1.	"Angel"	MacColl	Titanic Days, 1993	3:51
2.	"Soho Square"	MacColl, Nevin	Titanic Days	4:23
3.	"Bad"	MacColl	Titanic Days	2:45
4.	"Can't Stop Killing You"	Marr, MacColl	Titanic Days	4:03
5.	"Titanic Days" (Single edit)	MacColl, Nevin	Titanic Days	3:37
6.	"Tomorrow Never Comes"	MacColl, Nevin	Titanic Days	4:46
7.	"Caroline"	MacColl	Galore, 1995	2:55
8.	"I Am Afraid"	Dave Couse	1995 session outtake; previously unreleased	3:15
9.	"The Butcher Boy"	Traditional	B-side of "Caroline", 1995	3:56
10.	"As Long As You Hold Me"	Bragg	Mad Love soundtrack, 1995	4:34
11.	"Perfect Day" (Kirsty MacColl and Evan Dando)	Lou Reed	Galore	3:49
12.	"Sail Away" (Ghostland and Kirsty MacColl)	Randy Newman	Beautiful People soundtrack, 1999	3:13
13.	"Libertango" (Sharon Shannon feat. Kirsty MacColl)	Astor Piazzolla, Barry Reynolds, Dennis Wilkey	Libertango, 2003 (Note: Originally released on Sharon Shannon's 1997 album Each Little Thing. The version featured on From Croydon to Cuba is a remix from Shannon's 2003 collaborations album Libertango.)	4:23
14.	"Golden Heart"	MacColl, Neill MacColl	B-side of "Mambo de la Luna", 1999; bonus track on Tropical Brainstorm US version, 2000	3:22
15.	"Mambo de la Luna" (Single edit)	David Ruffy, MacColl, Glenister	Tropical Brainstorm	3:31
16.	"In These Shoes?"	MacColl, Glenister	Tropical Brainstorm	3:38
17.	"England 2 Columbia 0"	MacColl	Tropical Brainstorm	3:46
18.	"Celestine"	MacColl	Tropical Brainstorm	3:34
19.	"Good for Me"	James Knight, MacColl	B-side of "In These Shoes?", 2000; bonus track on Tropical Brainstorm US version	4:10
20.	"Manhattan Moon"	Philip Chevron	2000 demo; (Note: December 2000 demo written for the in-progress musical Jack Rooney: In Person by Philip Chevron and Declan Lynch.) previously unreleased	3:34
21.	"Sun On the Water" (Demo)	MacColl, Glenister	1999–2000 demo; (Note: Demo recorded during the Tropical Brainstorm sessions.) previously unreleased	4:09
Total length:				79:26

== Production ==
Adapted from the box set liner notes.

Disc one

- Liam Sternberg – producer (1)
- Barry "Bazza" Farmer – producer (3–7, 9)
- Brian Hodgson – producer (8)
- Dave Jordan – producer (10–14)
- Kirsty MacColl – producer (15, 17)
- Gavin Povey – producer (15)
- Steve Lillywhite – producer (16, 18–22)

Disc two

- Steve Lillywhite – producer (1–7, 10, 13–20)
- Kirsty MacColl – producer (8, 9, 11, 12)
- Colin Stuart – producer (8, 9, 11, 12)
- Howard Gray – additional production (15)

Disc three

- Steve Lillywhite – producer (1)
- Gregg Jackman – additional production (1)
- Victor Van Vugt – producer (2–5, 7)
- Kirsty MacColl – producer (2–9, 11, 14–19)
- Mark E. Nevin – producer (2–6)
- Boz Boorer – producer (8, 9, 11)
- Andy Roberts – producer (10)
- John Reynolds – producer (12)
- Dónal Lunny – producer (13)
- Dave Ruffy – producer (15–18)
- Pete Glenister – producer (15–18, 21)
- James Knight – producer (19)
- Philip Chevron – producer (20)
- Nick Robbins – producer (20)

== Charts ==
Chart (2005)	Peak position
UK Albums Chart (OCC)	98
