= A New England: The Very Best of Kirsty MacColl =

Compilation album by Kirsty MacColl
- Released: 18 February 2013
- Length: 77:29
- Label: Union Square Music

Kirsty MacColl chronology
The Collection (2008)	A New England: The Very Best of Kirsty MacColl (2013)	All I Ever Wanted: The Anthology (2014)

A New England: The Very Best of Kirsty MacColl is a compilation album by British singer-songwriter Kirsty MacColl. It was released by Union Square Music in 2013 and reached No. 41 in the UK. The standard edition of the compilation contains 21 tracks. A limited edition release exclusive to Amazon was also issued with a bonus disc of 10 promotional videos and five art cards.

== Reception ==
Professional ratings
Review scores
Source	Rating
Daily Express	4/5 stars

Stephen Unwin of the Daily Express wrote: "No one ever quite matched [MacColl] in terms of pulling together lovely melodies and witty lyrics. This great collection rounds them all up."

== Track listing ==
No.	Title	Writer(s)	Length
1.	"In These Shoes?"	Kirsty MacColl, Pete Glenister	3:41
2.	"Walking Down Madison"	MacColl, Johnny Marr	4:39
3.	"A New England"	Billy Bragg	3:51
4.	"My Affair"	MacColl, Mark E. Nevin	5:24
5.	"Days"	Ray Davies	3:01
6.	"They Don't Know"	MacColl	3:03
7.	"Don't Come the Cowboy with Me, Sonny Jim!"	MacColl	3:49
8.	"England 2 Colombia 0"	MacColl	3:47
9.	"Terry"	MacColl, Gavin Povey	3:53
10.	"He's on the Beach"	MacColl, Povey	3:31
11.	"Miss Otis Regrets"	Cole Porter	2:51
12.	"Caroline"	MacColl	2:57
13.	"You Just Haven't Earned It Yet Baby"	Steven Morrissey, Marr	2:49
14.	"Celestine"	MacColl	3:35
15.	"Soho Square"	MacColl, Nevin	4:25
16.	"Free World"	MacColl	2:38
17.	"Bad"	MacColl	2:47
18.	"Innocence"	MacColl, Glenister	4:10
19.	"Angel (Floating Round This House)"	MacColl	5:07
20.	"There's a Guy Works Down the Chip Shop Swears He's Elvis"	MacColl, Philip Rambow	3:10
21.	"Fairytale of New York"	Shane MacGowan, Jem Finer	4:32

== Charts ==
Chart (2013)	Peak position
UK Albums Chart	41
