= The Best of Kirsty MacColl =

Compilation album by Kirsty MacColl
- Released: August 2005
- Length: 78:47
- Label: EMI

Kirsty MacColl chronology
The Stiff Years (2005)	The Best of Kirsty MacColl (2005)	Stiff Singles Collection (2006)

The Best of Kirsty MacColl is a compilation album by British singer-songwriter Kirsty MacColl. It was released by EMI in 2005 and reached No. 12 in the UK. The one-disc compilation, which was aimed at more casual fans of MacColl, followed the release of the three-disc set From Croydon to Cuba: An Anthology earlier in the year.

== Reception ==
Professional ratings
Review scores
Source	Rating
AllMusic	4.5/5 stars
The Guardian	4/5 stars
Sunday Tribune	4/5 stars

Upon release, Andy Kellman of AllMusic described the compilation as a "scaled-down version" of From Croydon to Cuba: An Anthology and "an introduction to a brilliant career full of highlights". He concluded: "All of MacColl's well-known and extremely varied songs are here". Adam Sweeting of The Guardian considered the compilation "a reminder of MacColl's whimsical charm and musical audacity". Worcester News summarised: "This album is an admirable collection of her greatest work." Jack Smith of the BBC described the album as "a timeline revealing the true diversity of Kirsty's work and the minutiae of English life".

== Track listing ==
No.	Title	Writer(s)	Length
1.	"They Don't Know"	Kirsty MacColl	3:03
2.	"There's a Guy Works Down the Chip Shop Swears He's Elvis"	MacColl, Philip Rambow	3:10
3.	"Terry"	MacColl, Gavin Povey	3:53
4.	"A New England"	Billy Bragg	3:51
5.	"He's on the Beach"	MacColl, Povey	3:31
6.	"Don't Come the Cowboy with Me, Sonny Jim!"	MacColl	3:49
7.	"Fairytale of New York" (with The Pogues)	Shane MacGowan, Jem Finer	4:32
8.	"Free World"	MacColl	2:38
9.	"Innocence"	MacColl, Pete Glenister	4:10
10.	"Days"	Ray Davies	3:01
11.	"Still Life"	MacColl, Rambow	2:58
12.	"Miss Otis Regrets" (with The Pogues)	Cole Porter	2:51
13.	"Walking Down Madison"	MacColl, Johnny Marr	4:39
14.	"My Affair"	MacColl, Mark E. Nevin	5:24
15.	"Soho Square"	MacColl, Nevin	4:25
16.	"Titanic Days"	MacColl, Nevin	5:43
17.	"As Long As You Hold Me"	Bragg	4:34
18.	"Perfect Day" (with Evan Dando)	Lou Reed	3:50
19.	"In These Shoes?"	MacColl, Glenister	3:41
20.	"England 2 Colombia 0"	MacColl	3:47
21.	"Sun on the Water"	MacColl, Glenister	4:09

== Charts ==
=== Weekly charts ===
Chart (2005)	Peak position
Scottish Albums (OCC)	26
UK Albums (OCC)	12

=== Year-end charts ===
Chart (2005)	Position
UK Albums (OCC)	189
