= Galore (Kirsty MacColl album) =

Compilation album by Kirsty MacColl
- Released: 6 March 1995
- Genre: Alternative rock; folk rock; country rock
- Length: 62:28
- Label: Virgin
- Producer: Steve Lillywhite

Kirsty MacColl chronology
Titanic Days (1993)	Galore (1995)	What Do Pretty Girls Do? (1998)

Professional ratings
Review scores
Source	Rating
AllMusic	4.5/5 stars
Encyclopedia of Popular Music	5/5 stars
NME	7/10

Galore is a compilation album released by Kirsty MacColl in 1995. It features material previously released on the studio albums Desperate Character (1981), Kite (1989), Electric Landlady (1991) and Titanic Days (1993), among other tracks by MacColl, totalling eighteen songs. Some of the tracks differ from their original releases; a couple of songs, such as "Innocence", are alternate takes, while "Miss Otis Regrets" is a different edit that omits the second half, "Just One of Those Things", performed by the Pogues. On release the album peaked at No. 6, MacColl's highest ever charting album.

== Track listing ==
No.	Title	Writer(s)	Length
1.	"They Don't Know"	Kirsty MacColl	3:02
2.	"A New England"	Billy Bragg	3:49
3.	"There's a Guy Works Down the Chip Shop Swears He's Elvis"	MacColl; Philip Rambow	3:07
4.	"He's on the Beach"	MacColl; Gavin Povey	3:31
5.	"Fairytale of New York" (The Pogues featuring Kirsty MacColl)	Shane MacGowan; Jem Finer	4:32
6.	"Miss Otis Regrets" (Edit; Kirsty MacColl with the Pogues)	Cole Porter	2:49
7.	"Free World"	MacColl	2:36
8.	"Innocence" (Single Remix)	MacColl; Pete Glenister	4:00
9.	"You Just Haven't Earned It Yet Baby"	Morrissey; Johnny Marr	2:48
10.	"Days"	Ray Davies	3:00
11.	"Don't Come the Cowboy with Me Sonny Jim!"	MacColl	3:46
12.	"Walking Down Madison"	MacColl; Marr	4:37
13.	"My Affair"	MacColl; Mark E. Nevin	5:24
14.	"Angel"	MacColl	3:51
15.	"Titanic Days"	MacColl; Nevin	5:43
16.	"Can't Stop Killing You"	MacColl; Marr	4:10
17.	"Caroline"	MacColl	2:46
18.	"Perfect Day" (Kirsty MacColl and Evan Dando)	Lou Reed	3:50

== Liner notes ==
The liner notes for the album include testimonials from MacColl's associates, including:

"Unpretentious, inimitable, writes like a playwright, sings like an angel." Billy Bragg

"When you hear these songs of Kirsty's, you're going to want to hang out with her too." Chris Frantz and Tina Weymouth

"One in a line of great English songwriters that includes Ray Davies, Paul Weller and Morrissey… the Noelle Coward of her generation!" Bono

"She has great songs and a crackin' bust." Morrissey

"Why isn't she massively successful? Kirsty's got the talent, the looks, the guts, the imagination, the passion, the hunger and whatever that magic thing is that makes her one of the great one-offs, and should be up where she belongs." Shane MacGowan

"The voice of an angel from a mind and heart inflamed by Thatcher's England." David Byrne

"Strange stories of people, relationships and life, with all the wit of Ray Davies and the harmonic invention of The Beach Boys. Only cooler." Johnny Marr

== Critical reception ==
"Her songs are built from the stuff of real people's real lives, not the moonings of an imagination stalled on the tour bus," enthused Q's David Hepworth in a four-star review, "and they underline the fact that great pop music is still among us if we only know where to look." NME noted the compilation contains "all of her finest moments in pop" and felt the "best of which tend to be duets". David Bennun of Melody Maker was negative in his review, concluding, "Galore charts a musical career that seems to have existed for no particular reason, and has bequeathed us a back catalogue of no great distinction."

== Charts ==
Chart (1995)	Peak position
Scottish Albums (OCC)	10
UK Albums (OCC)	6
