= The Essential Collection (Kirsty MacColl album) =

Compilation album by Kirsty MacColl
- Released: 1993
- Length: 52:54
- Label: Stiff Records

Kirsty MacColl chronology
Electric Landlady (1991)	The Essential Collection (1993)	Titanic Days (1993)

The Essential Collection is a compilation album by British singer-songwriter Kirsty MacColl, released by Stiff Records in 1993. It contains seventeen tracks covering MacColl's early recording career for Stiff and includes those released as singles and B-sides, as well as selections from her debut album Desperate Character (1981). The last three tracks are included as bonus tracks.

== Critical reception ==
Professional ratings
Review scores
Source	Rating
AllMusic	4.5/5 stars

Chris Woodstra of AllMusic described the compilation as a "fine collection", with "some of the best singles [MacColl] ever [wrote]". He added: "She wrote melodic pop singles that managed to recast the classic girl-group sound of the '60s into a style that was contemporary and timeless."

== Track listing ==
No.	Title	Writer(s)	Length
1.	"There's a Guy Works Down the Chip Shop Swears He's Elvis"	Kirsty MacColl, Philip Rambow	3:09
2.	"A New England"	Billy Bragg	3:51
3.	"Patrick"	MacColl	3:07
4.	"Eighty Year Old Millionaire"	MacColl	2:52
5.	"See That Girl"	MacColl	3:04
6.	"Until the Night"	MacColl, Phil Johnstone	3:10
7.	"Just One Look"	Doris Payne, Gregory Carroll	2:18
8.	"He Thinks I Still Care"	Roysden D. Lipscombe, Steve Duffy	2:57
9.	"They Don't Know"	MacColl	3:03
10.	"Turn My Motor On"	MacColl	2:24
11.	"Please Go to Sleep"	MacColl	2:31
12.	"Terry"	MacColl, Gavin Povey	3:55
13.	"Quietly Alone"	MacColl	2:40
14.	"Teenager in Love"	MacColl, Rambow	2:38
15.	"A New England" (12" version)		7:56
16.	"Terry" (12" version)		5:19
17.	"There's a Guy Works Down the Chip Shop Swears He's Elvis" (Country version)		3:44
