= What Do Pretty Girls Do? =

Compilation album by Kirsty MacColl
- Released: 1998
- Length: 48:04
- Label: Hux Records

Kirsty MacColl chronology
Galore (1995)	What Do Pretty Girls Do? (1998)	Tropical Brainstorm (2000)

What Do Pretty Girls Do? is a live compilation album by British singer-songwriter Kirsty MacColl, released by Hux Records in 1998. The compilation features fifteen tracks recorded across four BBC Radio One sessions between 1989 and 1995.

Tracks 1–4 were recorded for Nicky Campbell in 1989 and tracks 5–8 also recorded for Campbell in 1991. "Darling, Let's Have Another Baby" and "A New England" of the latter session features Billy Bragg. Tracks 9–11 were recorded for Simon Mayo in 1994 and tracks 12–15 for Kevin Greening in 1995.

== Reception ==
Professional ratings
Review scores
Source	Rating
AllMusic	4.5/5 stars
The Encyclopedia of Popular Music	3/5 stars

Chris Woodstra of AllMusic wrote: "BBC sets are always fun for fans, but for an artist like MacColl, who has always shyed away from live performance and whose albums have always been meticulously produced, this one is particularly revealing. She sounds relaxed and, the sheer quality of the songs (and her voice) is made even more apparent in this straightforward, no-frills setting." Ben Varkentine of PopMatters commented: "Some of the songs are given small-backing group treatments that should force even longtime fans to reconsider just how good a songwriter she was. Stripped of MacColl's trademark backing vocal tricks or any production polish, the songs must get by on their own. And do they, oh man, do they."

== Track listing ==
No.	Title	Writer(s)	Length
1.	"Don't Come The Cowboy With Me Sonny Jim"	Kirsty MacColl	3:41
2.	"What Do Pretty Girls Do?"	MacColl	2:36
3.	"Don't Run Away from Me"	MacColl, Philip Rambow	2:56
4.	"Still Life"	MacColl, Rambow	3:05
5.	"There's a Guy Works Down the Chip Shop Swears He's Elvis"	MacColl, Rambow	3:48
6.	"Walk Right Back"	Sonny Curtis	3:37
7.	"Darling, Let's Have Another Baby"	Fred Berk	2:39
8.	"A New England"	Billy Bragg	3:27
9.	"My Affair"	MacColl, Mark E. Nevin	3:44
10.	"Bad"	MacColl	1:58
11.	"Can't Stop Killing You"	MacColl, Johnny Marr	3:53
12.	"Caroline"	MacColl	2:48
13.	"Free World"	MacColl	2:44
14.	"He's on the Beach"	MacColl, Gavin Povey	3:27
15.	"A New England"	Bragg	3:29

== Personnel ==
Musicians

- Kirsty MacColl – vocals
- Phil Rambow – acoustic guitar
- Martin Belmont – guitar
- Pete Glenister – guitar
- Bobby Valentine – violin
- Gavin Povey – piano
- Paul Riley – bass guitar
- Pete Thomas – drums
- Billy Bragg – vocals, guitar (tracks 7–8)
- Lu Edwards – bouzouki
- Simon Edwards – bass guitar
- Mark Nevin – guitar
- Dave Ruffy – bongos
- Segs – bass, percussion

Production

- Peter Watts – producer (tracks 1–8)
- Martyn Parker – engineering (tracks 1–8)
- Chris Whatmough – producer (tracks 12–15)

Other

- Charles Dickens – photography
- Neil at 9th Planet, London – design
