= The One and Only (Kirsty MacColl album) =

Compilation album by Kirsty MacColl
- Released: 2001
- Length: 55:47
- Label: Metro

Kirsty MacColl chronology
Tropical Brainstorm (2000)	The One and Only (2001)	From Croydon to Cuba: An Anthology (2005)

The One and Only is a compilation album by British singer-songwriter Kirsty MacColl. It was released by Metro in 2001 and reached No. 34 on the UK Budget Albums Chart. The compilation features fourteen tracks from MacColl's recording career with Stiff Records.

== Reception ==
Professional ratings
Review scores
Source	Rating
AllMusic	4/5 stars
The Encyclopedia of Popular Music	3/5 stars

Richie Unterberger of AllMusic described the compilation as "rather eccentric" and a "collection of above-average (mostly) '80s pop/rock".

== Track listing ==
No.	Title	Writer(s)	Original release	Length
1.	"A New England"	Billy Bragg	1984 single	3:49
2.	"They Don't Know"	MacColl, Philip Rambow	1979 single	3:02
3.	"Terry"	MacColl	1983 single	3:53
4.	"Libertango"	Astor Piazzolla	Each Little Thing (Sharon Shannon, 1997)	4:23
5.	"Turn My Motor On"	MacColl	B-side of "They Don't Know"	2:23
6.	"I'm Going Out with an Eighty Year Old Millionaire"	MacColl	B-side on 12" version of "A New England"	2:51
7.	"Patrick"	MacColl	B-side of "A New England"	3:05
8.	"He's on the Beach"	MacColl, Gavin Povey	1985 single	5:22
9.	"The Manchester Rambler"	Ewan MacColl	1983 recording from Black and White: The Definitive Ewan MacColl Collection (1990)	4:42
10.	"Quietly Alone"	MacColl	B-side of "Terry"	2:35
11.	"Please Go to Sleep"	MacColl	B-side of "He's On the Beach"	2:29
12.	"Terry (12" Mix)"	MacColl		5:16
13.	"Greetings to the New Brunette"	Bragg	Talking with the Taxman About Poetry (Billy Bragg, 1986)	3:31
14.	"A New England (12" Mix)"	Bragg		7:55

== Charts ==
Chart (2002)	Peak position
UK Budget Albums Chart	34
