= Sheona White =

Sheona White is a British tenor horn player who is the current solo horn of the Cory Band. She was previously with Brighouse and Rastrick Band, and was the solo tenor horn player of the Yorkshire Building Society, Black Dyke and Foden's Richardson bands. She was as horn tutor at the University of Salford, where she gained her Bachelor of Arts with honours with distinction in performance.

White's previous achievements include playing principal horn of the National Youth Brass Band of Scotland, winning the BBC Radio 2 Young Musician of the Year in 1996, and reaching the final of the 1998 Cosmopolitan Magazine Women of Achievement Awards.

Outside the band world, White is most well known for her contribution to the BBC's 1997 charity single, "Perfect Day". White has recorded an album of solos for her chosen instrument, titled The Voice of The Tenor Horn. She previously worked as a music teacher at Lowton High School. She now works at Bolton School Girls Division as a music teacher.
