= Real (Kirsty MacColl album) =

Studio album by Kirsty MacColl
- Released: 27 October 2023
- Recorded: January 1983
- Genre: Synth-pop
- Length: 56:08
- Label: Universal Music Recordings
- Producer: Dave Jordan

Kirsty MacColl chronology
| See That Girl 1979–2000 (2023) | Real (2023) | Free World: The Best Of 1979-2000 (2024) |

Singles from Real
- 1. "Lullaby for Ezra" Released: 7 September 2023

Real is a studio album by English singer and songwriter Kirsty MacColl, recorded and intended for release in 1983. The album was to follow-up Desperate Character (1981), but it was shelved by Polydor Records. It was finally released posthumously on 27 October 2023 as part of the box set See That Girl 1979–2000 and as a standalone release on digital platforms.

== Background ==
After leaving Stiff Records, MacColl signed to Polydor Records in 1980 and released four singles and the album Desperate Character on the label during 1981. In January 1983, she recorded her second album for Polydor at Regents Park Studios in London with Dave Jordan as producer, but Polydor ultimately decided not to release it as they did not consider the material to be commercial enough. "Berlin" was originally selected as the intended lead single, with the catalogue numbers POSP569 and POSPX569 being assigned to the 7-inch and 12-inch (full length) versions respectively. The non-album track "Rhythm of the Real Thing" was due to be the B-side.

MacColl told John Tobler in 1989,

"I did Desperate Character for Polydor and then I did another album for them, but I think they'd already decided I was a tax loss and didn't want to know because nobody ever came down while I was recording it. I thought it was a bit odd that they didn't ask to hear any demos or anything. I was quite glad because it meant I could just get on with it, but they sort of dropped it immediately when I delivered it. It felt like I'd had a baby and left it abandoned in a phone box. I didn't write for a long time after that. There were some good songs on the album. 'Berlin' and 'Annie' were good, and there was a really good one called 'Lullaby for Ezra'."

After the album was shelved, MacColl and Polydor parted ways and she returned to her earlier label, Stiff Records. In a November 1983 interview with Smash Hits, MacColl announced her intention to have the album released through Stiff, although this did not materialise: "Stiff [have] bought the rights to it. It's my baby and I want people to hear it." She told Debut in 1985 of her difficult relationship with Polydor and the shelving of the album, "They just wanted twelve versions of 'There's a Guy Works Down the Chip Shop Swears He's Elvis' – it was very frustrating. You spend three months working on something, pouring out your heart and soul, writing songs, getting the best musicians, you get it all done in the studio and the record company refuse to release it. Then you start to think why bother? I can't see why Polydor signed me up, really."

== Release ==
Following MacColl's top 10 success with "A New England" in 1985, Polydor released a re-worked version of Desperate Character under the name Kirsty MacColl, which included three tracks from Real: "Annie", "Roman Gardens" and "Berlin". A further two tracks, "Camel Crossing" and "Sticked and Stoned", first surfaced on the 2005 compilation From Croydon to Cuba: An Anthology. The release also included "Rhythm of the Real Thing", "Berlin" and "Roman Gardens". On 27 October 2023, Universal Music Recordings released the 161-track box set See That Girl 1979–2000, which included the complete Real album with its ten tracks in their intended sequence. Real was also released on digital platforms as a standalone release with two bonus tracks: the full length version of "Berlin" and "Rhythm of the Real Thing". Preceding the release was a digital single, "Lullaby for Ezra", on 7 September 2023.

== Critical reception ==
Wyndham Wallace of Classic Pop commented that Real is the "unforgivably unreleased New Wave-influenced album that should have been a highlight long ago". He noted the "Scary Monsters" "wonky" "Bad Dreams", the "triumphantly Bananarama-esque" "Annie", "experimentally Japan-like" "Camel Crossing", the "airy synth-pop" of "Lullaby for Ezra" and the "hypnotic, extended groove" of "Up the Grey Stairs". Timothy Monger of AllMusic described it as MacColl's "detour into sleek early-'80s synth pop" and John Lewis of Uncut called it a "curious piece of Gary Numan-style gothic techno, featuring Pino Palladino on fretless bass". Iain Key of Louder Than War noted how many of the songs see MacColl "taking influence from the then contemporary, more electronic sounds" and continued, "Whilst it's interesting I'm not sure what reception it would have got if released at the time." Terry Staunton of Record Collector was negative in his review, commenting that the album is "awkwardly cold and synthetic".

== Track listing ==
All tracks are written by Kirsty MacColl except where noted.

| No. | Title | Writer(s) | Length |
|---|---|---|---|
| 1. | "Bad Dreams" | | 4:47 |
| 2. | "Time" | | 3:49 |
| 3. | "Sticked and Stoned" | | 3:47 |
| 4. | "Annie" | | 4:37 |
| 5. | "Camel Crossing" | | 5:21 |
| 6. | "Berlin" | | 3:35 |
| 7. | "Man with No Name" | | 3:37 |
| 8. | "Lullaby for Ezra" | MacColl, Lu Edmonds | 3:52 |
| 9. | "Up the Grey Stairs" | | 6:40 |
| 10. | "Roman Gardens" | Hamish MacColl, Gavin Povey | 5:00 |

Bonus tracks
| No. | Title | Writer(s) | Length |
|---|---|---|---|
| 11. | "Berlin" (Full length version) | | 5:56 |
| 12. | "Rhythm of the Real Thing" | MacColl, Simon Climie | 5:00 |

== Personnel ==
Known contributors to the album include:

- Pino Palladino
- Hans Zimmer
- Lu Edmonds
- Gavin Povey

Production

- Dave Jordan – production
- Philip Bodger – engineering

Other

- Paul Cox – photography
- Estuary English – cover design
