= I Want Out (Matchbox song) =

Single by Matchbox featuring Kirsty MacColl

from the album Crossed Line
- B-side: "Heaven Can Wait"
- Released: February 1983
- Length: 2:42
- Label: Magnet
- Songwriter(s): Brian Hodgson; Ray Peters; Tony Colton
- Producer(s): Brian Hodgson

Matchbox singles chronology
"Riding the Night" (1982)	"I Want Out" (1983)

Kirsty MacColl singles chronology
"You Still Believe in Me" (1981)	"I Want Out" (1983)	"Berlin" (1983)

"I Want Out" is a song by English rockabilly band Matchbox featuring Kirsty MacColl. It was released in 1983 as the third and final single from the band's sixth studio album Crossed Line (1982). It was written by Brian Hodgson, Ray Peters and Tony Colton, and produced by Hodgson.

== Background ==
"I Want Out" failed to make an appearance in the top 100 of the UK Singles Chart, but reached number 137 in the top 200 chart compiled by Gallup. It also appeared at number 86 on Record Business magazine's Top 100 Airplay chart on 31 January 1983. The song reached number 58 on the West German Singles Chart in March 1983.

To promote the single in Germany, Matchbox and MacColl performed the song on Musikladen, which was broadcast on 10 February 1983. In the UK, MacColl made an appearance at a Matchbox concert at the Venue in London in 1983. She performed "I Want Out" with the band, along with her own hit "There's a Guy Works Down the Chip Shop Swears He's Elvis".

== Critical reception ==
Upon its release as a single, the Hartlepool Mail described "I Want Out" as a "belting rocker" and wrote, "The backing at the beginning sounds as if it's straight out of a Sixties Eddie Cochran session and the midway break is in the style of Buddy Holly. The duet overlaying this is exciting and could be a massive hit." Mansfield and Sutton Recorder considered it to have "a true Matchbox sound with the added magic of Kirsty MacColl, sharing the lead vocal with Graham Fenton". Smash Hits wrote, "There's not many rock 'n' roll acts who are worse than Shakin' Stevens but here's one. Nevertheless, this is saved by a real rootsy-tootsy vocal from Kirsty." Frank Edmonds of the Bury Free Press gave the song a six and a half out of 10 rating and wrote, "So would I if I made a record like this! No, seriously, it's not too bad, really." Jim Reid of Record Mirror commented, "English people trying to be redneck Americans, nearly as embarrassing as Kajagoogoo's imitation of a vibrant new pop group."

== Track listing ==
7" single

1. "I Want Out" – 2:42
2. "Heaven Can Wait" – 3:03

== Personnel ==
Matchbox

- Graham Fenton – lead vocals
- Dick Callan – lead guitar
- Gordon Scott – guitar
- Brian Hodgson – bass
- Jimmie Redhead – drums

Additional musicians

- Kirsty MacColl – lead vocals

Production

- Brian Hodgson – producer
- Bazza – engineer
- Dave Bellotti, Phil Vinall – assistant engineers

== Charts ==
Chart (1983)	Peak position
Netherlands (Tipparade)	18
UK Singles Chart	137
West Germany (GfK)	58
