= You Caught Me Out (song) =

Single by Kirsty MacColl
- B-side: "Boys"
- Released: 27 October 2023
- Recorded: 1979
- Length: 3:25
- Label: Universal Music Recordings
- Songwriter(s): Kirsty MacColl; Pete Briquette; Simon Crowe
- Producer(s): Liam Sternberg

Kirsty MacColl singles chronology
"Sun on the Water" (2005)	"You Caught Me Out" (2023)

Alternative Cover
- White label pressing of the intended 1979 release on Stiff.

"You Caught Me Out" is a song written by Kirsty MacColl, Pete Briquette and Simon Crowe. It was originally recorded by MacColl in 1979, with Liam Sternberg as the producer, but the intended single release later that year was shelved. In 2023, it was issued as a limited edition 7-inch single. Versions have also been recorded by Australian singer Christie Allen and British-American singer/actress Tracey Ullman.

== Background ==
After signing to Stiff, Maccoll released her debut single "They Don't Know" in June 1979. The song was a radio hit, but a strike at the label's distributors resulted in the single's failure to enter the UK Singles Chart. Despite the setback, MacColl soon recorded a follow-up, "You Caught Me Out", on which she collaborated with members of the Irish rock band The Boomtown Rats. MacColl co-wrote the song with the band's bassist Pete Briquette and drummer Simon Crowe, and they recorded the track with her, alongside the band's keyboardist Johnnie Fingers. Guitar was provided by Brinsley Schwarz of Brinsley Schwarz.

The release date for "You Caught Me Out" was changed multiple times and the song underwent various mixes, with earlier ones being deemed unsatisfactory by Stiff and subsequently rejected. MacColl told Smash Hits in 1981, "There were so many people mixing it that in the end it became a joke. People literally used to come up to me in pubs and say 'You don't know me but I mixed your single'."

When "You Caught Me Out" was intended for release during October 1979, it was included as one of a number of singles which Stiff were set to push that Autumn under a new sales representation deal with Virgin. The upcoming release of the single was announced in the 1 October 1979 issue of Record Business. Stiff pressed a limited number of promotional and white label copies of the single, but its release was soon shelved as relations between MacColl and Stiff became strained. MacColl was dissatisfied with the level of artistic control she had and left the label in February 1980. She subsequently signed with Polydor.

== Release ==
MacColl's recording of "You Caught Me Out" was given its first official release on the 2005 box-set From Croydon to Cuba: An Anthology. It has appeared on two other MacColl compilations: the 2005 download-only release The Stiff Years and the 2006 Japanese compilation Stiff Singles Collection. A different mix of the song was included on the 2007 various artists release The Big Stiff Box Set.

The intended 1979 single release was set to have "Boys" as the B-side, a track written by MacColl and George Lloyd. Until the single's 2023 limited edition release, the song had not seen an official release but had surfaced on YouTube.

In September 2023, it was announced that "You Caught Me Out" would be released by Universal Music Recordings as a limited edition seven-inch single on 27 October 2023, alongside a new 161-track collection See That Girl. The single sleeve features a previously unpublished photograph of MacColl with Simon Crowe and Pete Briquette, taken by Adrian Boot.

== Critical reception ==
In 2006, John C. Hughes of Popdose noted the "driving, punky feel" of MacColl's version, in comparison to Ullman's, which he considered "even more hyper", with "the organ higher in the mix, the beat more insistent [and] the vocals more histrionic".

== Cover versions ==
- In 1980, Australian singer Christie Allen released a version of the song on her second and final studio album Detour.
- In 1984, British-American singer and actress Tracey Ullman released her version of the song on her album of the same name. Ullman's version, which was produced by Peter Collins, was released as a single in Japan in 1985, with the non-LP track "Falling In And Out Of Love" as the B-side.

== Track listing ==
7" single

1. "You Caught Me Out" - 3:25
2. "Boys" - 1:50

== Personnel ==
- Kirsty MacColl – vocals
- Brinsley Schwarz – guitar
- Johnnie Fingers – keyboards
- Pete Briquette – bass
- Simon Crowe – drums

Production

- Liam Sternberg – production
- Mick Glossop – engineering

Other

- Adrian Boot – photography (2023 release)

== Charts ==
Chart (2023)	Peak position
UK Physical Singles Chart (OCC)	6
UK Singles Sales Chart (OCC)	58
UK Vinyl Singles Chart (OCC)	5
