= Titanic Days =

Album by Kirsty MacColl

Studio album by Kirsty MacColl
- Released: 5 October 1993
- Recorded: 1993
- Studios: Townhouse 2; Townhouse 3; Ealing Studios; Master Rock (London)
- Genres: Alternative rock; pop rock; folk rock; country rock; blues-rock
- Length: 47:41
- Labels: ZTT (Europe); I.R.S. (US)
- Producers: Victor Van Vugt; Kirsty MacColl; Mark E. Nevin; Steve Lillywhite

Kirsty MacColl chronology
The Essential Collection (1993)	Titanic Days (1993)	Galore (1995)

Singles from Titanic Days
- 1. "Titanic Days" Released: 1993 (US-only release); 2. "Can't Stop Killing You" Released: 1993 (Australia and US-only release); 3. "Angel" Released: 6 December 1993

Titanic Days is the fourth studio album by Kirsty MacColl, released in 1993. Containing eleven tracks, Titanic Days was sometimes hard to get in years after its release, but it was remastered and re-released in 2005 by ZTT with a second CD of non-album tracks and some live recordings, including a version of "Miss Otis Regrets". In 2012, another remastered re-issue of the album was released by Salvo/ZTT, which again featured a second disc of bonus tracks. This is the final album to be produced by her husband Steve Lillywhite, before they divorced several years after the release.

== Background ==
"I suppose it's a bit subdued in a sense. It's more personal and serious to a certain extent. It was the hardest album I have ever done. I hope the next one is easier and I hope I am not as depressed as I was when I did this album."

— MacColl discussing the album with Gilbert Blecken in 1994.

Following the release of her third studio album Electric Landlady in 1991, MacColl continued to write songs that would be recorded for her follow-up release Titanic Days. However, in 1992, when Virgin was sold to EMI, MacColl was dropped from the label, leaving her new material to be recorded without a record deal. Much of the album, including vocals and overdubs, was recorded in MacColl's small home studio at Ealing, due to the limited budget. The musicians who appeared on the recordings, largely from MacColl's own live band, agreed to wait for payment for their contributions until a record deal was finalised. MacColl and her band spent two days at Townhouse Studios in London, where all the backing tracks were recorded.

The album was recorded over an approximate period of eighteen months. MacColl told Sunday Life in 1994: "In many ways this album was recorded back to front. I was writing songs, playing them live and knocking them into shape, then recording them for the album, when normally it would be the other way around."

When the album was completed, ZTT Records agreed to release the album as a one-off release. In the United States, the album was released by I.R.S. Records, which MacColl signed to after being introduced to the head of the label, Jay Boberg, as he happened to be the husband of a childhood friend.

During the time of writing and recording the album, MacColl's marriage to Steve Lillywhite was disintegrating. As such, much of album's material reflected MacColl's personal issues. She told Billboard in 1993: "There were big things happening in my life, and then every time you turned on the TV, there was a war going on and countries changing. It was such a strange period, it was so huge, that's why we called the album "Titanic Days"."

== Promotion ==
Both "Angel" and "Soho Square" were performed on Later... with Jools Holland in November 1992. "Can't Stop Killing You" was performed on Late Night with Conan O'Brien in November 1993 and "Bad" on Kenny Live in February 1994.

== Songs ==
Speaking to Gilbert Blecken in 1994, MacColl described "Last Day of Summer" as being "lyrically quite dark, but musically very bright". "Tomorrow Never Comes" was recorded in a single day, with Nevin playing guitar, bass and organ. In MacColl's The One and Only biography, Nevin described the song as his favourite on the album.

== Critical reception ==
Professional ratings
Review scores
Source	Rating
AllMusic	4/5 stars
Pitchfork	8.2/10

Upon its release, Andrew Boyd of Reading Evening Post felt the album had a "satisfying diversity of styles on offer" and was a "commercial and pleasingly varied effort which should cheer MacColl fans everywhere". Neil McKay of Sunday Life noted the album's "tales of domestic violence and strife, intercut with a neat turn of phrase and sense of humour".

Billboard described the album as "a brew of pure pop sense and biting wit at least as satisfying as her previous work". They picked "Can't Stop Killing You", "Soho Square", "Angel", "Bad", "Big Boy on a Saturday Night" and "Titanic Days" as the album's "high points". The Age picked Titanic Days as their "Album of the Week" and commented: "Titanic Days builds on the strengths of [her] last effort - strong songs, memorable hooks and a gentle ebb and flow between acoustic and electric."

== Track listing ==
=== CD one ===
All tracks composed by Kirsty MacColl and Mark E. Nevin; except where indicated

1. "You Know It's You" – 4:01
2. "Soho Square" – 4:25
3. "Angel" – 5:07 (MacColl)
4. "Last Day of Summer" – 4:22
5. "Bad" – 2:47 (MacColl)
6. "Can't Stop Killing You" – 4:12 (MacColl, Johnny Marr)
7. "Titanic Days" – 5:43
8. "Don't Go Home" – 4:11
9. "Big Boy on a Saturday Night" – 3:58
10. "Just Woke Up" – 4:02 (MacColl, Dave Ruffy)
11. "Tomorrow Never Comes" – 4:47

=== CD two ===
1. "Angel" (Piano Mix) – 3:18 (MacColl)
2. "Fabulous Garden" – 3:15 (MacColl)
3. "King Kong" (Demo) – 3:57
4. "Dear John" (Demo) – 2:43
5. "Miss Otis Regrets" (Recorded live at the Belly Up Club, Solana Beach, San Diego 1 Dec 93) – 3:03 (Cole Porter)
6. "Free World" (Recorded live at the Belly Up Club, Solana Beach, San Diego 1 Dec 93) – 2:45 (MacColl)
7. "Touch Me" – 3:36 (MacColl, Pete Glenister)
8. "Irish Cousin" (Demo) – 4:48
9. "Angel" (Single Mix) – 3:42 (MacColl)
10. "Angel" (Stuart Crichton Remix) – 6:24 (MacColl)
11. "Angel" (Into the Light Mix) – 5:36 (MacColl)
12. "Angel" (Apollo 440 Remix) – 8:08 (MacColl)

== Personnel ==
Adapted from the album liner notes.

Musicians

- Kirsty MacColl – vocals, guitar (3, 5), keyboards (6)
- Mark E. Nevin – guitar (1–11), bass (11), harmonium (11)
- Dave Ruffy – drums (1–3, 6, 7, 9, 10), programming (3, 10)
- Gary Tibbs – bass (1–3, 5–7, 9, 10), backing vocals (9)
- Pete Glenister – guitar (1–3, 6, 7, 9, 10)
- Jamie West-Oram – guitar (1, 9)
- Chester Kamen – guitar (6, 10)
- Roy Dodds – drums (4, 5, 11), percussion (4, 5, 11), congas (6)
- Steve Nieve – keyboards (1, 2, 7, 9)
- Kate St. John – oboe (2), Cor Anglais (5)
- Kim Burton – keyboards (4)
- Simon Edwards – bass (4)
- Roger Beaujolais – vibraphone (5)
- Andy Kowalski – additional programming (10)
- Ken Rice – violin (3)
- Fiachra Trench – string arrangements (1, 2, 4–11)
- Gavyn Wright – string leader (1, 2, 4–11)

Technical

- Victor Van Vugt – producer, engineer (1, 2, 4–10)
- Kirsty MacColl – producer (1, 2, 4–11)
- Mark E. Nevin – producer (1, 2, 4–11)
- Steve Lillywhite – producer (3), mixing
- Andy Kowalski – mixing assistant
- Alan Douglas – engineer (11)

CD two

- Steve Lillywhite – producer (1, 9–12), remixing (11)
- Victor Van Vugt – producer (2, 7)
- Kirsty MacColl – producer (2, 7)
- Mark E. Nevin – producer (2, 7)
- Peter Kaye – producer, mixing (5, 6)
- Stuart Crichton – additional production, remixing (1, 10)
- Gregg Jackman – additional production, remixing (9)
- Apollo 440 – remixing (12)

Notes

- As co-producers, Kirsty MacColl and Mark E. Nevin are credited as Baboon Farm on the album cover on tracks 1, 2, 4–10, and tracks 2 and 7 on CD Two.
- Tracks 3, 4 and 8 on CD Two are unreleased demos from the Titanic Days sessions.

== Charts ==
Chart performance for Titanic Days
Chart (1993–1994)	Peak position
Australian Albums (ARIA)	187
UK Albums Chart	47
US New Rock Albums (Radio & Records)	16
