= See That Girl =

Single by Kirsty MacColl

from the album Desperate Character
- B-side: "Over You"
- Released: 11 September 1981
- Length: 3:01
- Label: Polydor
- Songwriter(s): Kirsty MacColl
- Producer(s): Barry "Bazza" Farmer

Kirsty MacColl singles chronology
"There's a Guy Works Down the Chip Shop Swears He's Elvis" (1981)	"See That Girl" (1981)	"You Still Believe in Me" (1981)

"See That Girl" is a song by English singer-songwriter Kirsty MacColl, released on 11 September 1981 by Polydor as the second single from her debut studio album, Desperate Character. It was written by MacColl and produced by Barry "Bazza" Farmer.

For its release as a single, the LP version of "See That Girl" was given a remix. As the follow-up to MacColl's "There's a Guy Works Down the Chip Shop Swears He's Elvis", which reached number 14 in the UK Singles Chart in July 1981, "See That Girl" failed to make an appearance in the UK charts. It did, however, gain radio airplay and reached number 45 on Record Business magazine's Airplay Guide Top 100 chart in October 1981.

On 20 October 1981, MacColl performed the song on the ITV children's series Get It Together.

== Critical reception ==
Upon its release as a single, Sunie of Record Mirror considered "See That Girl" to be "a marked improvement on the hideous novelty" of "There's a Guy Down the Chip Shop Swears He Elvis" and "more in the vein" of MacColl's 1979 single "They Don't Know". She added, "In other words, this is one of Kirsty's rather precious Sixties-style girlie songs, very much the sort of thing Sandie Shaw used to warble." She described MacColl's vocal as "aiming towards a Marianna circa 'As Tears Go By'." Peter Trollope of the Liverpool Echo described it as "another strong single which should follow 'Elvis' into the charts." Paul Du Noyer of the NME stated, "No 'Chip Shop' maybe – it sounds a bit like every '60s song you ever heard – but acceptable and nice and other such moderate terms of approval."

Ian Birch of Smash Hits was negative in his review, stating, "The song recalls one of those rush jobs that appeared on countless B-sides during the '60s. Even Kirsty sounds bored and she wrote the song." He felt MacColl should have "stayed in the wings until something as snappy as 'Chip Shop' presented itself". Paul Colbert of Melody Maker called it "a disappointing second course" to "Chip Shop" as he felt it lacked its predecessor's "verve of daft lovability". He noted it is "closer to a ballad" in comparison and, although "ably performed by Kirsty", was critical of the production as "by half-time [her] vocals have all but vanished in a wallowing sea of piano, drums and guitar which flop about and soon disperse interest". Dave McCullough of Sounds called it "more pointless pap from the anonymous Ms MacColl" and added that the song "sounds like a hundred Nick Lowe cliches sewn haplesly together without forming anything of sense". He continued, "It's too bright and too thin. It's the wrong side of modern pop, the side that will soon be left behind."

== Track listing ==
7-inch single

1. "See That Girl" - 3:01
2. "Over You" - 2:42

== Charts ==
Chart (1981)	Peak position
UK Airplay Guide (Record Business)	45
