= Caroline (Kirsty MacColl song) =

1995 single by Kirsty MacColl

Single by Kirsty MacColl

from the album Galore
- B-side: "Irish Cousin"
- Released: 20 February 1995
- Genre: Power pop; country rock
- Length: 2:56
- Label: Virgin
- Songwriter: Kirsty MacColl
- Producers: Victor Van Vugt; Kirsty MacColl

Kirsty MacColl singles chronology
"Can't Stop Killing You" (1993)	"Caroline" (1995)	"Perfect Day" (1995)

"Caroline" is a song by British singer and songwriter Kirsty MacColl, released in February 1995 as a single from her compilation album Galore. The song was written by MacColl, and produced by Victor Van Vugt and MacColl. "Caroline" reached number 58 in the UK Singles Chart and remained in the top 100 for two weeks.

== Background ==
MacColl wrote "Caroline" in the early 1990s. She chose not to include the song on her 1994 album Titanic Days as she felt it sounded more like her older work and was not in keeping with the rest of the album's material.

The song's lyrics were inspired by Dolly Parton's "Jolene" and is written from the point of view of the Jolene character. MacColl told The Lennox Herald in 1995, "Basically it's Jolene's reply. I just didn't think that there were that many songs where the third party in that eternal triangle gets her shot at replying. Songs are usually written from the man's point of view of the woman that he's gone off with." She said about the Caroline character's situation in the song, "She's embarrassed because he's not worth it." MacColl added to The Morning Call: "A lot of the songs I heard growing up were written by men for women. There was a lot of, 'Oh, I can't live without my man.' I don't write songs about women as victims. I think it's been done to death."

== Critical reception ==
Upon its release as a single, Caitlin Moran of Melody Maker wrote, "As probably the only person in the world who is willing to stand up and say 'Kirsty MacColl is brilliant, Kite was a fantastic album, she's written some of the greatest songs to grace the top 20, and you can tell she's a really cool bird who likes a pint', it was an enormous relief to find that 'Caroline' was actually rather better than quite good." Andrew Hirst of the Huddersfield Daily Examiner felt it was "Not her finest moment, but it's still pretty good" and added, "Kirsty is the mistress of folk-blessed pop and has a voice to match her rich melodies."

The Paisley Daily Express described it as "another typically Kirsty MacColl single, jangly, upbeat, but ultimately a non-event". Emma Forrest of NME wrote, "Something in me wants to like Kirsty. However, this just isn't good enough. All of a sudden, 'Fairytale of New York' is starting to feel more than a plane ride away." In the US, Larry Flick of Billboard stated, "Loosely intended as an Irish-cultured takeoff on Dolly Parton's "Jolene," MacColl swings back into action with tongue placed firmly in cheek. Track has a toe-tapping acoustic tone that frames her vocal to maximum effect."

In a review of Galore, Roch Parisien of the Times Colonist considered the song "perhaps [McColl's] most potent, direct pop-rock construction yet". Joe Szczechowski of The News Journal felt it was a "bright, acoustic-based rocker" and Mike Boehm of the Los Angeles Times described it as "catchy". Patrick Davitt of The Leader-Post considered the song "excellent pop" with a "strong hint of the "California Sound"." In a retrospective review of the song, Stewart Mason of AllMusic commented: "A remarkable song both lyrically and musically, it's one of MacColl's biggest triumphs. A country-tinged pop song filled with ultra-jangly guitars and breathy harmonies, [it has] a chorus that Marshall Crenshaw would kill to have written."

== Track listings ==
7-inch single

1. "Caroline" – 2:56
2. "Irish Cousin" – 4:49

CD single (UK release)

1. "Caroline" – 2:56
2. "El Paso" – 3:49
3. "My Affair" (Ladbroke Groove Mix) – 6:08

CD single (UK release)

1. "Caroline" – 2:56
2. "Irish Cousin" – 4:49
3. "New England" – 3:31
4. "The Butcher Boy" – 3:57

== Personnel ==
- Kirsty MacColl – producer of "Caroline", "Irish Cousin", "El Paso" and "The Butcher Boy"
- Victor Van Vugt – producer of "Caroline"
- Boz Boorer – producer of "Irish Cousin" and "The Butcher Boy"
- Colin Stuart – producer of "El Paso"
- Steve Lillywhite – producer of "New England" and "My Affair"
- Howard Gray – remix of "My Affair"

== Charts ==
Chart (1995)	Peak position
UK Singles (OCC)	58
UK Top 50 Airplay Hits (Music Week)	38
