= He's on the Beach =

Single by Kirsty MacColl
- B-side: "Please, Go to Sleep"
- Released: 10 June 1985
- Genre: Pop
- Length: 3:32
- Label: Stiff
- Songwriters: Kirsty MacColl; Gavin Povey
- Producer: Steve Lillywhite

Kirsty MacColl singles chronology
"A New England" (1985)	"He's on the Beach" (1985)	"Fairytale of New York" (1987)

Music video
- "He's on the Beach" on YouTube

"He's on the Beach" is a song by British singer-songwriter Kirsty MacColl, released on 10 June 1985 as a non-album single by Stiff Records. It was written by MacColl and Gavin Povey, and produced by Steve Lillywhite.

== Background ==
"He's on the Beach" was inspired by a friend of MacColl's named Terry, who emigrated to Australia and sent postcards to her. Speaking of the song, MacColl told Record Mirror in 1985, "A bit of sunshine would do the single a lot of good. It's a summer single and I'm sure people will rush out and buy it if the clouds cleared. The single has no hidden depths, it's just about a bloke out in Australia enjoying himself."

== Release ==
"He's on the Beach" was released in the UK on 10 June 1985. Although MacColl's previous single "A New England" reached the UK top ten earlier in the year, "He's on the Beach" did not repeat the same commercial success and failed to make the top 100 of the UK Singles Chart. The song received airplay on BBC Radio 1 and was added to many A or B lists across Independent Local Radio. The single failed to chart again when it was reissued in the UK on 23 June 1986.

After the single's failure, MacColl primarily worked as a session backing singer and also recorded the UK number two hit "Fairytale of New York" with The Pogues in 1987. She returned as a solo artist with her album Kite in 1989.

In 1995, MacColl performed an acoustic version of "He's on the Beach" as part of a four-track session for BBC Radio 1. It was later included on her compilation album What Do Pretty Girls Do?, released in 1998.

== Music video ==
The song's music video was directed by Nick Morris and produced by Fiona O'Mahoney. It received "heavy action" on the pan-European Music Box channel. MacColl also performed the song on Wogan, which was broadcast on 24 June 1985.

== Critical reception ==
On its release, Graham K. Smith of Record Mirror wrote, "All [MacColl's] usual ingredients are here - sometime bittersweet but ultimately optimistic lyric, hefty, pacey backbeat, just the right amount of memorable jangling and those trebly harmonised vocals. A tribute to lost love? A yearning for sunnier climes? A summer hit? All these, and more..." Anne Lambert of Number One commented, "It's even better than "A New England", more bouncy and with a chorus that stays in your brain after just one listen." Chris Heath of Smash Hits wrote, "Even though Kirsty wrote this herself it sounds very much like "A New England" - lots of shiny guitars above which a million Kirsty MacColls breathlessly sing the tune." Dave Henderson of Sounds stated, "So, if Billy Bragg won't write a song for you, just run the backing track and change the words. Kirsty is in fine voice. Pop slop without the vinegar. Whatever happened to the guy down the chip shop?"

Jerry Smith of Music Week wrote, "Bright summery guitars and distinctive Kirsty vocals mark this driving pop song. In a similar style to her massive hit "A New England", although lacking such memorable hook, it should be a minor hit." Paul Massey of Aberdeen Evening Express commented, "Snazzy pop, but much too like "A New England" I'm afraid. A disappointment from someone as talented as Kirsty." Frank Edmonds of the Bury Free Press gave the song a 6 out of 10 rating and stated, "This sounds almost exactly like "A New England" - the only difference being it doesn't have Bragg's masterful lyrics."

In a review of MacColl's 1995 compilation album Galore, Larry Printz of The Morning Call described the song as "Spector-esque". Steve Pick of the St. Louis Post-Dispatch wrote: "This is the first time I've heard her version of "Chip Shop" or any version of "He's on the Beach". These songs turn on her youthful enthusiasm at a time when she made everything gallop along at a rapid, rhythmically simple clip." Patrick Davitt of The Leader-Post described the song as "excellent pop", "whose jangly guitar pop supports one of many crystal sweet vocals and the lovely harmony vocals that are all over this album."

In a 2001 career retrospective on MacColl, No Depression stated: "[MacColl] could also multi-track her crystal-clear voice into gorgeous cushions of pop perfection (check out the harmonies on her own "He's on the Beach")." In a retrospective review of the song, Stewart Mason of AllMusic described it as "a minor classic" and one of MacColl's "very best singles" and "finest performances". He described the lyrics as "a wistful but ultimately uplifting story", which MacColl "sings with a mix of joy and resignation that's sublime." In 2017, Kevin Wuench of the Tampa Bay Times commented: "The single did not chart even in her home country, but that doesn't diminish the great pop song and its scenic video."

== Cover versions ==
- In 1993, American alternative rock band The Lemonheads released a version of the song on their single "Big Gay Heart". Lead singer Evan Dando would later record "Perfect Day" as a duet with MacColl for Galore. MacColl told the St. Louis Post-Dispatch in 1995: "We [Evan] were friends, really. I met him a couple of years ago, and we hung out a bit in various countries, whenever we happened to be in the same one. He was a big fan of "He's on the Beach," and he told me about that before he recorded it. I was quite flattered really, and I was more flattered because he's a really good songwriter and has quite a good voice."

== Track listing ==
7" single

1. "He's on the Beach" - 3:32
2. "Please, Go to Sleep" - 2:28

12" single

1. "He's on the Beach" (Extended Version) - 8:06
2. "He's on the Beach" - 5:22
3. "Please, Go to Sleep" - 2:28
