= Angel (Kirsty MacColl song) =

Single by Kirsty MacColl

from the album Titanic Days
- B-side: "Angel (Jay's Edit)"
- Released: 6 December 1993
- Length: 3:40
- Label: ZTT
- Songwriter: Kirsty MacColl
- Producers: Steve Lillywhite; Gregg Jackman

Kirsty MacColl singles chronology
"All I Ever Wanted" (1991)	"Angel" (1993)	"Can't Stop Killing You" (1993)

"Angel" is a song by British singer and songwriter Kirsty MacColl, released on 6 December 1993 as the lead single from her fourth studio album, Titanic Days. It was written by MacColl and produced by Steve Lillywhite. For its release as a single, "Angel" was remixed with additional production by Gregg Jackman. The song reached number 87 in the UK Singles Chart and number 26 on the US Billboard Modern Rock Tracks chart.

== Background ==
Speaking to Melinda Newman of Billboard, MacColl said of the song: "It's a euphoric song. It's kind of a feeling of being protected. It makes me feel better when I hear that one." The artwork on the single's sleeve is from the 1989 painting "Guardian Angel" by Holly Johnson.

== Critical reception ==
Upon its release, Music & Media commented, "The holiday season will last a little longer with this folk song in a Christmas atmosphere. Traditional instruments and the modern rhythm track are living in perfect harmony." Andrew Hirst of the Huddersfield Daily Examiner picked "Angel" as the newspaper's "single of the week" and wrote, "Kirsty is one of Britain's top songstresses with the voice to match. Starts with mournful bagpipes and then gets better and better. Sincere, sensitive, honest – in short, first-rate." Jane Downing of the Sunday Sun awarded a 5 out of 10 rating and commented, "I used to like Kirsty MacColl but she seems to have lost it in recent years."

In a review of Titanic Days, Peter Holmes of The Sydney Morning Herald noted that the song, with its "gentle hip hop rhythm and floating vocal", "sounds as if it were written for her by Single Gun Theory, no small compliment". Dave Hall of the Tampa Bay Times commented that it "soars amid a hypnotic dance tempo". Ira Robbins of Trouser Press remarked that the "evanescent" "Angel" has a "bustling club beat and pizzicato violin plucks". Gary Graff, in his book MusicHound Rock: The Essential Album Guide noted the "mutant dub/hip-hop beat supporting MacColl's ethereal vocals".

== Track listing ==
7" single

1. "Angel" - 3:40
2. "Angel" (Jay's Edit) - 3:52

12" single

1. "Angel" - 3:40
2. "Angel" (Apollo 440 Remix) - 8:08
3. "Angel" (Jay's Edit) - 3:52
4. "Angel" (Stuart Crichton Remix) - 5:33

CD single

1. "Angel" - 3:40
2. "Angel" (Jay's Edit) - 3:52
3. "Angel" (Apollo 440 Remix) - 8:08
4. "Angel" (Stuart Crichton Remix) - 6:24
5. "Angel" (Into The Light Mix) - 5:33

== Personnel ==
- Kirsty MacColl - vocals, guitar
- Mark E. Nevin - guitar
- Pete Glenister - guitar
- Gary Tibbs - bass
- David Ruffy - drums
- Ken Rice - violin

Production

- Steve Lillywhite - producer
- Gregg Jackman - additional production and remixing on single version of "Angel"
- Apollo 440, Stuart Crichton - remixes

Other

- Holly Johnson - cover painting

== Charts ==
Chart (1993–1994)	Peak position
UK Singles Chart	87
UK Airplay Breakers (Music Week)	4
US Billboard Modern Rock Tracks	26
