= Can't Stop Killing You =

Single by Kirsty MacColl

from the album Titanic Days
- B-side: "Touch Me" "Fabulous Garden"
- Released: 1993
- Length: 4:12
- Label: Liberation Records (Australia); I.R.S. Records (US)
- Songwriter(s): Kirsty MacColl; Johnny Marr
- Producer(s): Victor Van Vugt; Baboon Farm

Kirsty MacColl singles chronology
"Angel" (1993)	"Can't Stop Killing You" (1993)	"Caroline" (1995)

Music video
- "Can't Stop Killing You" on YouTube

"Can't Stop Killing You" is a song by British singer and songwriter Kirsty MacColl, which was released in 1993 as the second single from her fourth studio album Titanic Days. It was written by MacColl and Johnny Marr, and produced by Victor Van Vugt and Baboon Farm. The song reached No. 20 on the US Billboard Modern Rock Tracks and remained on the chart for seven weeks.

== Background ==
Speaking of the song, MacColl told Dawn Eden of Videowave in 1993: "When I wrote the song, it was a very cinematic piece and the characters were like film characters to me. It wasn't a particularly autobiographical song." MacColl said of the lyrical message on abusive relationships: "People do have this terrible fear of being alone [and] that's why [they] get married and everything else, but there comes a point where you have to say 'Ok, well if this relationship's doing my head in all the time, why do you keep going back to it?'"

== Music video ==
The song's music video was directed by Tim Hunter. MacColl told Videowave: "When we came to make the video, I wanted to do it like I'd seen it in my head. We got a couple of great actors in it and I was really pleased with the performances they gave. [The video's] quite funny in a way and it's sort of frightening as well. I think it's a weird combination of scary and crazy."

== Critical reception ==
Upon release, Andrew Boyd of the Reading Evening Post felt the song's melody "hints at [Johnny Marr's] Electronic work." Jim Farber of New York's Daily News noted the song's "bold rock riff". In a review of Titanic Days, Brenda Herrmann of the Chicago Tribune commented: "MacColl's one of the few songwriters that can occasionally latch on to bits of Elvis Costello-ian wit without seeming contrived, as in her single "Can't Stop Killing You"."

Diana Valois of The Morning Call wrote: "Darkly wary, at times unsettling, MacColl's lyrics ritualize the memories of a past love ("Soho Square") or bear the mental and physical stigma of abuse ("Can't Stop Killing You")." Mitch Schafer of The Tampa Tribune commented: "...and you'll likely be tapping your toes and singing along to "Can't Stop Killing You," before you realize it's about a serial murderer." Steve Hall of The Indianapolis Star felt the song was a "cinematic rockers about a psychopath and one of his victims".

Mirabella wrote: "On "Can't Stop Killing You," she explores a realm of quiet inner terror set on top of prickly rock 'n' roll guitars." Ira Robbins of Trouser Press felt the song "sounds like an Anglofied Carly Simon classic". Both Billboard and Neil McKay of Sunday Life considered the song a highlight from Titanic Days.

== Track listing ==
CD single (Australian release)

1. "Can't Stop Killing You" - 4:12
2. "Touch Me" - 3:34
3. "Fabulous Garden" - 3:13

CD single (US promo)

1. "Can't Stop Killing You" - 4:04

== Personnel ==
- Kirsty MacColl - vocals, keyboards
- Mark E. Nevin - guitar
- Pete Glenister - guitar
- Gary Tibbs - bass
- David Ruffy - drums
- Ray Dodds - congas

Production

- Victor Van Vugt, Baboon Farm - producer, engineer
- Steve Lillywhite - mixing on "Can't Stop Killing You"

== Charts ==
Chart (1993)	Peak position
Australian ARIA Singles Chart	131
US Billboard Modern Rock Tracks	20
