= Innocence (Kirsty MacColl song) =

Single by Kirsty MacColl

from the album Kite
- B-side: "Clubland"
- Released: 18 September 1989
- Length: 3:59
- Label: Virgin
- Songwriter(s): Kirsty MacColl, Pete Glenister
- Producer(s): Steve Lillywhite

Kirsty MacColl singles chronology
"Days" (1989)	"Innocence" (1989)	"Don't Come the Cowboy with Me Sonny Jim!" (1990)

"Innocence" is a song by British singer and songwriter Kirsty MacColl, which was released in 1989 as the third single from her second studio album Kite. It was written by MacColl and Pete Glenister, and produced by Steve Lillywhite. "Innocence" reached No. 80 in the UK and remained in the charts for four weeks. The song's music video was filmed in the back garden of MacColl's home in Ealing. It was directed by Sarah Tuft and features a cameo appearance from Edward Tudor-Pole.

== Critical reception ==
On its release, Curiosity Killed the Cat, as guest reviewers for Number One, rated the single three out of five stars. Julian Brookhouse considered the song to be "very Beatley" and added, "I think this'll be a hit". Migi Drummond felt it was "a good song to play in all Irish pubs". In a review of the 'Guilt Mix', Tim Southwell of Record Mirror wrote, "This song finds Kirsty and her sidekicks in playful, nay, frivolous mood. While retaining its original catchy nature, 'Innocence' has also acquired a mocking quirkiness which suggests that everyone had a wonderful time in the recording studio." Dave Jennings of Melody Maker described the song as "engaging, entertaining viciousness" and commented, "Here's another neat bit of juxtaposition. Jaunty Beatleish guitars and skipping rhythms dance rings around Kirsty, who stands still in the midst of it all impassively delivering her mordant lines. 'Innocence' is undeniably a sharp-witted verbal laceration of some loathsome business bod."

In a review of Kite, Robin Denselow of The Guardian noted the song's "burst of good-time country". Steve Pick of the St. Louis Post-Dispatch commented, "Of her own songs, I'm particularly fond of 'Innocence,' with its bouncy vocal melody and interlocking guitar lines. The lyrics concern a bitter end to a relationship, although she delivers them with considerable humor." Eric McClary of the Reno Gazette-Journal wrote, "The intensely personal attacks of 'Innocence' and 'The End of a Perfect Day' are more cleverly couched in falsely lighthearted music, and therefore they pack a more devastating punch."

In a retrospective review of the song, Stewart Mason of AllMusic wrote, "The deceptively savage 'Innocence' kicks off Kite in a breezily subversive manner, setting a lyric of immense emotional violence to an upbeat and bouncy tune with an icily ironic singalong chorus. The lyrics are so plainly mean-spirited that even Elvis Costello circa 1978 would feel sorry for her victim."

== Track listing ==
7" single

1. "Innocence" (Remix) - 3:59
2. "Clubland" - 4:03

10" single (UK limited edition release)

1. "Innocence" (Remix) - 3:59
2. "Don't Run Away From Me Now" - 2:58
3. "Innocence" (The Guilt Mix) - 5:54
4. "Clubland" - 4:03

12" single

1. "Innocence" (The Guilt Mix) - 5:54
2. "No Victims" (Guitar Heroes Mix) - 4:23
3. "Clubland" - 4:03

CD single

1. "Innocence" (Remix) - 3:59
2. "No Victims" (Guitar Heroes Mix) - 4:23
3. "Innocence" (The Guilt Mix) - 5:54
4. "Clubland" - 4:03

== Personnel ==
- Kirsty MacColl - lead vocals
- Pete Glenister - acoustic guitar, electric guitar
- Yves N'Djock - electric guitar
- Colin Stuart - acoustic guitar
- Pino Palladino - bass
- Mel Gaynor - drums
- Gavyn Wright, Mark Berrow, Ben Cruft, Wilfred Gibson, Roy Gillard, David Woodcock - violins
- Jamie Lillywhite, Louis Lillywhite - backing vocals

Production

- Steve Lillywhite - producer of "Innocence", remixer on "No Victims (Guitar Heroes Mix)"
- Steve Chase, Colin Stuart - engineers on "Innocence"
- Noel Harris - recording assistant on "Innocence"
- Pete Glenister, Neil Brockbank - remix of "Innocence"
- Kirsty MacColl, Colin Stuart - producers of "Clubland" and "Don't Run Away from Me Now"
- Fred DeFaye - mixing on "Clubland"
- Colin Stuart, Fred DeFaye, Neil Brockbank - remixers of "Innocence (The Guilt Mix)"

Other

- Andrew McPherson - photography
- Bill Smith Studio - sleeve design

== Charts ==
Chart (1989)	Peak position
UK Singles Chart	80
