= Perfect Day (Lou Reed song) =

1972 song by Lou Reed

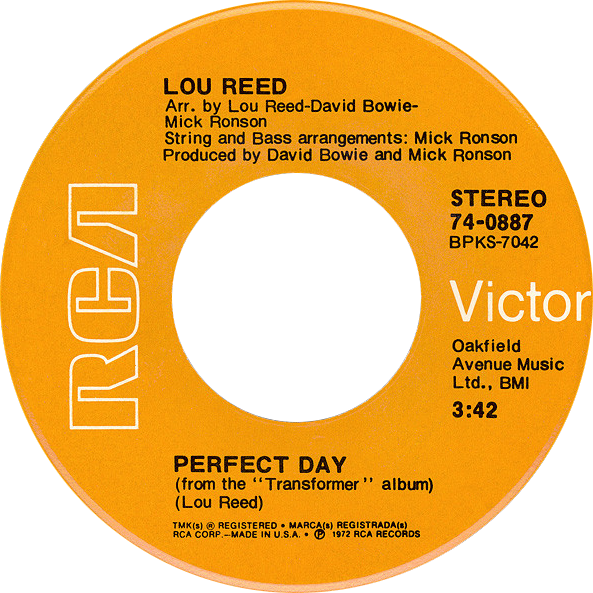
- One of label variants of the US single

Single by Lou Reed

from the album Transformer
- A-side: "Walk on the Wild Side"
- Released: November 1972
- Recorded: August 31, 1972
- Studio: Trident (London)
- Genre: Pop; glam rock; avant-pop
- Length: 3:46
- Label: RCA
- Songwriter: Lou Reed
- Producers: David Bowie; Mick Ronson

Lou Reed singles chronology
| "Walk on the Wild Side" / "Perfect Day" (1972) | "Satellite of Love" (1973) |

"Perfect Day" is a song written by American musician Lou Reed in 1972. It was originally featured on Transformer, Reed's second post-Velvet Underground solo album, and was released as a double A-side single with "Walk on the Wild Side". Its fame was given a boost in the 1990s when it was featured in the 1996 film Trainspotting and after a star-studded version was released as a BBC charity single in 1997, reaching number one in the United Kingdom, Ireland, and Norway. Reed re-recorded the song for his 2003 album The Raven. It is Reed's second-most successful solo single.

== Recording and writing ==
The original recording, as with the rest of the Transformer album, was produced by David Bowie and Mick Ronson (who also wrote the string arrangement and played piano on the track). The song has a sombre vocal delivery and a slow, piano-based instrumental backing.

The song was written after Lou Reed and his then fiancée (later his first wife), Bettye Kronstad, spent a day in Central Park. The lyric is often considered to suggest simple, conventional romantic devotion, possibly alluding to Reed's relationship with Kronstad and Reed's own conflicts with his sexuality, drug use and ego.

Some commentators have further seen the lyrical subtext as displaying Reed's romanticized attitude towards a period of his own addiction to heroin. This popular understanding of the song as an ode to addiction led to its inclusion in the soundtrack for Trainspotting, a film about the lives of heroin addicts. However, this interpretation, according to Reed himself, is "laughable". In an interview in 2000, Reed stated, "No. You're talking to the writer, the person who wrote it. No that's not true. I don't object to that, particularly...whatever you think is perfect. But this guy's vision of a perfect day was the girl, sangria in the park, and then you go home; a perfect day, real simple. I meant just what I said."

== Usage ==
The song was featured in films including Trainspotting, Prozac Nation, and Perfect Days and television shows including Westworld, Fear the Walking Dead, Our Flag Means Death, Brave New World, Scarpetta, and The Monster of Florence.

== Certifications ==
| Region | Certification | Certified units/sales |
|---|---|---|
| Italy (FIMI) sales since 2009 | Gold | 15,000^{‡} |
| Spain (Promusicae) | Gold | 30,000^{‡} |
| United Kingdom (BPI) sales since 2004 | Gold | 400,000^{‡} |
^{‡} Sales+streaming figures based on certification alone.

== Duran Duran version ==
"Perfect Day"

Single by Duran Duran

from the album Thank You
- B-side: "Femme Fatale"
- Released: March 13, 1995
- Length: 3:53
- Label: EMI; Capitol
- Songwriter: Lou Reed
- Producer: Duran Duran

Duran Duran singles chronology
| "Too Much Information" (1993) | "Perfect Day" (1995) | "White Lines (Don't Do It)" (1995) |

Music video
- "Perfect Day" on YouTube

A cover version of "Perfect Day" was the first single from the Duran Duran covers album Thank You (1995). It was released in the United Kingdom on March 13, 1995, by EMI and Capitol Records. It reached number 28 on the UK Singles Chart the same month. The cover was also serviced to US contemporary hit radio on May 23, 1995.

The song featured a then-rare appearance by Duran Duran's first drummer Roger Taylor. He also appeared in the music video and in a promotional appearance on Top of the Pops. The video was filmed in February 1995 by director Nick Egan, and first aired in March. It shows clips of the band performing, interspersed with surreal images.

The single was released in several versions, including numerous different remixes of the title track and other Duran Duran songs. In addition to the single and the Thank You album, the song also appeared in Duran Duran's Singles 1986–1995 box set, released in 2004. On Duran Duran's episode of Behind the Music, Reed described the Duran Duran version as being potentially the best rerecording of any of his songs.

=== Critical reception ===
Pete Stanton from Smash Hits gave Duran Duran's version four out of five, writing, "'Perfect Day' just could get everyone excited again. It's a haunting melody with a cheery message like feed animals in the zoo."

== Kirsty MacColl and Evan Dando version ==
"Perfect Day"

Single by Kirsty MacColl and Evan Dando

from the album Galore
- Released: June 12, 1995
- Length: 3:50
- Label: Virgin
- Songwriter: Lou Reed
- Producers: Kirsty MacColl; Boz Boorer

Kirsty MacColl singles chronology
| "Caroline" (1995) | "Perfect Day" (1995) | "Days" (1995) |

In 1994, British singer-songwriter Kirsty MacColl and American musician Evan Dando recorded the song as a duet. It was included as one of two new tracks on MacColl's 1995 compilation album Galore and reached number 75 in the UK Singles Chart when released as a single on June 12, 1995, by Virgin Records.

MacColl has described the song as "glorious and tragic at the same time". Speaking of her collaboration with Dando, she told Steve Harris in 1995: "I met Evan a couple of years ago and we sort of talked about possibly doing something together. When I was recording the new tracks for [Galore], I thought "Perfect Day" would be a really good song to do as a duet [and that] he would be the ideal person to sing it with me." MacColl was initially unsure of how to contact Dando, but decided to record the backing track in anticipation of being able to add his contribution at a later date. By coincidence, Dando phoned MacColl two days after the backing track was recorded to let her know he was performing in London with his band The Lemonheads and he agreed to provide vocals on the track while in the UK. In 2022, Dando recalled to Stereogum that collaborating with MacColl was "great" and "really fun".

=== Critical reception ===
Music Week described "Perfect Day" as a "hugely sentimental ballad" with Dando "shockingly in deep-voiced crooner mode". Nick Marshall of the Hull Daily Mail considered the version to be "very moody" and remarked about Dando's vocals, "If you think Bob Geldof has attitude, listen to Dando." He felt that MacColl "fits well into this serene ballad, but battles in sharp contrast to her spritely lyrics she has become renowned for". Caitlin Moran of the Irish Independent praised it as "a languorous version" on which MacColl and Dando duet "beautifully".

Anthony Barnes of the Sunderland Echo called it a "faithful rendition in the wake of the dreadful Duran Duran version" and a "perfect pairing of vocal talents for this sombre classic". Jennifer Nine of Melody Maker was critical of what she felt was a 'pablum-smooth rendition", in which "every last bit of menace, irony and life has been sucked out" and MacColl and Dando sound "Prozac-ed into a coma". Mark Sutherland from Smash Hits gave it four out of five, writing, "It's a lovely song. Kirsty has one of the most beautiful voices in pop and even old bonkers Lemonhead Evan relocates the plot for long enough to make a husky-but-lovely contribution to the tune. If you're gonna duet, duet right — and these two certainly duet fantastically."

== BBC corporate film and charity release ==
"Perfect Day"

Single by various artists
- Released: November 17, 1997
- Recorded: 1997
- Length: 3:46
- Label: Chrysalis; BBC
- Songwriter: Lou Reed
- Producers: Steve Kelynack, The Music Sculptors; Mark Sayer-Wade & Tolga Kashif & Simon Hanhart

In 1997, the BBC made a version of the song in a lengthy corporate promotion of its diverse music coverage which was broadcast on BBC channels, in cinemas, and at major events organised by the BBC such as the Eurovision Song Contest 1998. It featured Lou Reed himself and other major artists in what the Financial Times described as "an astonishing line-up of world class performers". In reference to the licence fee, the film ends with the message "Whatever your musical taste, it is catered for by BBC Radio and Television. This is only possible thanks to the unique way the BBC is paid for by you. BBC. You make it what it is." This message appears over the repeated words "You're going to reap just what you sow" which The Guardian described as "a none too subtle message: keep writing the cheque." In response to accusations from commercial competitors that the corporation had wasted vast sums on the film, Steve Kelynack, the film's executive producer, revealed that each artist received a "token" £250, which was at the time the minimum pay for a performance on BBC.

Prompted by huge public demand, the track was released on November 17, 1997, as a charity single for Children in Need, and Reed commented, "I have never been more impressed with a performance of one of my songs." It was the UK's number one single for three weeks, in two separate spells. The record contributed £2,125,000 to the charity's highest fundraising total in six years, and, as of September 2017, has sold 1.55 million copies. The release featured two additional versions of the song: one entirely sung by female performers, one by male performers. The BBC also produced a Christmas version of the accompanying music video.

In Ireland, the song was a huge success, remaining at number one for seven weeks and becoming 1997's Christmas number one. The single also topped the Norwegian Singles Chart for seven weeks in late 1997 and early 1998, spending 17 weeks on the chart in total. Elsewhere in Europe, it reached number four in Finland, number six in the Netherlands, number seven in Flemish Belgium and number 10 in Iceland. It was also a top-thirty hit in Austria, New Zealand and Walloon Belgium.

The song has not been digitally released to digital music platforms as the "single [is] unusable again in a commercial context due to the specific nature of the clearances for Children In Need at the time".

=== Performers ===
Performers in order of appearance; parentheses indicate instrumental or vocalisation appearances, and dividers indicate verses/sections.

- Lou Reed
- Bono
- Skye Edwards (from Morcheeba)

- David Bowie
- Suzanne Vega
- Elton John
- (Andrew Davis)

- Boyzone
- Lesley Garrett
- (Lou Reed)
- Burning Spear
- Bono
- Thomas Allen
- (Brodsky Quartet)

- Heather Small (from M People)
- Emmylou Harris
- Tammy Wynette
- Shane MacGowan
- (Sheona White) (tenor horn player)

- Dr. John
- David Bowie
- Robert Cray
- Huey Morgan (from Fun Lovin' Criminals)

- Ian Broudie (from The Lightning Seeds)
- Gabrielle
- Dr. John
- Evan Dando (from the Lemonheads)
- Emmylou Harris

- (Courtney Pine) (soprano saxophone player)
- (BBC Symphony Orchestra)
- (Andrew Davis)
- (Bono)

- Brett Anderson (from Suede)
- Visual Ministry Choir
- Joan Armatrading
- Laurie Anderson
- Heather Small
- Tom Jones
- Heather Small
- Lou Reed

=== Critical reception ===
Alan Jones from Music Week said the song is "a rare example of a charity record which actually sounds good in its own right."

=== Charts ===
==== Weekly charts ====
| Chart (1997–1998) | Peak position |
|---|---|
| Austria (Ö3 Austria Top 40) | 24 |
| Belgium (Ultratop 50 Flanders) | 7 |
| Belgium (Ultratop 50 Wallonia) | 22 |
| Estonia (Eesti Top 20) | 14 |
| Europe (Eurochart Hot 100) | 5 |
| Finland (Suomen virallinen lista) | 4 |
| Germany (GfK) | 54 |
| Iceland (Íslenski Listinn Topp 40) | 10 |
| Ireland (IRMA) | 1 |
| Latvia (Latvijas Top 20) | 6 |
| Netherlands (Dutch Top 40) | 7 |
| Netherlands (Single Top 100) | 6 |
| New Zealand (Recorded Music NZ) | 25 |
| Norway (VG-lista) | 1 |
| Scottish Singles Sales (Official Charts) | 1 |
| Sweden (Sverigetopplistan) | 31 |
| Switzerland (Schweizer Hitparade) | 37 |
| UK Singles (Official Charts) | 1 |

==== Year-end charts ====
| Chart (1997) | Position |
|---|---|
| Belgium (Ultratop 50 Flanders) | 79 |
| UK Singles (OCC) | 4 |

| Chart (1998) | Position |
|---|---|
| Europe (Eurochart Hot 100) | 60 |
| Netherlands (Single Top 100) | 48 |
| UK Singles (OCC) | 57 |

=== Certifications ===
| Region | Certification | Certified units/sales |
|---|---|---|
| Belgium (BRMA) | Gold | 25,000^{*} |
| Norway (IFPI Norway) | Platinum | |
| United Kingdom (BPI) | 2× Platinum | 1,550,017 |
^{*} Sales figures based on certification alone.

=== Sequels ===
Following the success of the "Perfect Day" music video, the BBC produced three further similar campaigns. The first, Future Generations, in December 1998, did a similar multi-celebrity montage with favourite BBC children's programmes. The second, called Shaggy Dog Story, featured various comedians and comic actors telling a long-winded shaggy dog story, with each one sharing a line or phrase. A second, shorter shaggy dog story, entitled Mammals vs. Insects, was also broadcast on January 4, 2000. Seventeen years after "Perfect Day"'s release, the BBC produced a campaign for their new music division where 27 musicians (labelled "The Impossible Orchestra") covered the Beach Boys' "God Only Knows". The only person to appear in both campaigns is Sir Elton John.

The cover was parodied on a 1997 special Harry Enfield and Chums, as well as by Matt Lucas and David Walliams.

The single inspired Sony Music to release a various artists compilation album, Perfect Day, in early 1998. It reached number 7 in the UK Compilation Chart. It featured Reed's original version of the song instead of the Various Artists version.

=== Music Live 2000 ===
A BBC live television event in 2000, which consisted of music programs around the clock, ended in another round-robin performance of "Perfect Day". Although watched by millions, the recording of the show that was released as a single was not a chart success, reaching only number 69 in mid-June 2000.

This line-up included Rolf Harris and a beginning and ending performance from Lou Reed himself.

== Susan Boyle version ==
"Perfect Day"

Single by Susan Boyle

from the album The Gift
- Released: November 8, 2010
- Length: 4:31
- Label: Syco; Columbia
- Songwriter: Lou Reed
- Producer: Steve Mac

Susan Boyle singles chronology
| "I Dreamed a Dream" (2010) | "Perfect Day" (2010) | "I Know Him So Well" (2011) |

Scottish recording artist Susan Boyle covered the song on her second album, The Gift (2010), and also released it on November 8, 2010, as a single by Syco/Columbia Records.

On November 19, 2010, she performed the song on Children in Need. She also performed this again at the 82nd Royal Variety Performance, performed on the December 9, 2010.

=== Conflict with Lou Reed ===
In September 2010, Susan Boyle had to cancel a performance on America's Got Talent at the last minute. She had planned to sing "Perfect Day", but two hours before the show, she was told that Lou Reed had intervened, refusing her permission to perform his song and to include it on her forthcoming album The Gift. As she and her choir did not have time to rehearse another number, she decided to cancel her performance. A couple of days later, representatives of Reed stated that he had nothing to do with the decision and that it was just a licensing glitch.

A couple of weeks later, Reed agreed not only to let her include the song on The Gift, but also to produce her music video of the song. It was shot on the banks of Loch Lomond and premiered on November 7, 2010.

=== Charts ===
| Chart (2010) | Peak position |
|---|---|
| Belgium (Ultratip Bubbling Under Flanders) | 32 |
| UK Singles (OCC) | 124 |

== Other versions ==
In 2023, Al Green and Raye released a cover of the song.

== Vatican tweet ==
Soon after Reed's death in 2013, Cardinal Gianfranco Ravasi, the Vatican's culture minister, made news by tweeting lyrics from the song:

Oh, it's such a perfect day
I'm glad I spent it with you
Oh, such a perfect day
You just keep me hanging on

As the song is sometimes interpreted by listeners to be drug-related, the cardinal later clarified that he did not condone drug use.

== See also ==
- List of number-one singles of 1997 (Ireland)
- List of UK Singles Chart number ones of the 1990s § 1997
