= Terry (Kirsty MacColl song) =

Single by Kirsty MacColl
- A-side: "Terry"
- B-side: "Quietly Alone"
- Released: October 1983
- Recorded: 1983
- Genre: Rock; pop
- Label: Stiff Records
- Songwriter(s): Kirsty MacColl; Gavin Povey
- Producer(s): Kirsty MacColl; Gavin Povey

Kirsty MacColl singles chronology
"Berlin" (1983)	"Terry" (1983)	"A New England" (1984)

"Terry" is a song by Kirsty MacColl, released as a single in October 1983, and charting at No. 82 in the UK the following month. It was her first release after returning to Stiff Records, and was the last in a run of poorly selling singles released between "There's a Guy Works Down the Chip Shop Swears He's Elvis" and "A New England". The music video featured an appearance from actor and comedian Ade Edmondson, who played MacColl's rejected boyfriend who got her back after fighting off a rival man. The photo on the front sleeve features MacColl and Chris Heester.

"Terry" was specifically written for Tracey Ullman to record; however, MacColl ended up doing her own version at the request of her label as part of an intended album of "teen ballads". Ullman's version of the song later charted one place higher in the UK, peaking at No. 81 in January 1985. Ullman's version uses the same backing track as MacColl's, merely erasing MacColl's lead vocal and substituting Ullman's. (MacColl co-produced both versions of "Terry".)

Speaking of the song's titular character, MacColl told Smash Hits in 1983: "Terry seems to be a really good name for a lovable rogue. He's similar to the Marlon Brando character in On the Waterfront. She thinks he's the greatest thing since Elvis."

== Critical reception ==
Upon its release, Robin Smith of Record Mirror wrote, "A superbly atmospheric voice on a pretty torrid tale of out of reach love. Kirsty never seems to get the airplay she deserves, but let's hope the partnership with Ms Ullman pricks up a few ears." Jools Holland, as guest reviewer for Smash Hits, commented, "She is the talented songwriter that wrote Tracey Ullman's last hit and so rightly deserves one in her own right." Sandy Robertson of Sounds noted that MacColl "re-emerges with typically off-the-wall-of-sound naive pop/love stuff" and concluded, "Fluff with potential in a Mari Wilson world."

Mark Cooper of Number One considered the song to be a "predictable rocker with a tongue in its head but no other distinguishing features". Frank Edmonds of the Bury Free Press gave the song a 5 out of 10 rating and wrote, "Appalling teenage drama which would be funny if the tune didn't stick in your throat so much. Gives you that funny feeling in the pit of your stomach."

In a review of Ullman's version, Mike Gardiner of Record Mirror commented that "there's something very used about this" and was critical of the reuse of MacColl's original backing track.

== Kirsty MacColl version track listing ==
1. "Terry" (K. MacColl / G. Povey)
2. "Quietly Alone" (K. MacColl)

On the 12" release, an extended version of "Terry" is used.

== Tracey Ullman version track listing ==
1. "Terry" (K. MacColl / G. Povey)
2. "I Don't Want Our Loving to Die" (Ken Howard, Alan Blaikley)

== Charts ==
=== Kirsty MacColl version ===
Chart (1983–1984)	Peak position
Belgium (Ultratop 50 Flanders)	34
Netherlands (Single Top 100)	43
Netherlands (Tipparade)	11
UK Singles (OCC)	82

=== Tracey Ullman version ===
Chart (1985)	Peak position
UK Singles (OCC)	81
