= Miss Otis Regrets =

1934 song composed by Cole Porter

Song
- Published: 1934 by Harms
- Songwriter: Cole Porter

"Miss Otis Regrets" is a song about the lynching of a society woman after she murders her unfaithful lover. It was composed by Cole Porter in 1934, and first performed by Douglas Byng in Hi Diddle Diddle, a revue that opened on October 3, 1934, at London's Savoy Theatre.

== Background ==
The song began during a party at the New York apartment of Porter's classmate from Yale, Leonard Hanna. Hearing a cowboy's lament on the radio, Porter sat down at the piano and improvised a parody of the song. He retained the referential song’s minor-keyed blues melody and added his wry take on lyrical subject matter common in country music: the regret of abandonment after being deceitfully coerced into sexual submission. Instead of a country girl, however, Miss Otis is a polite society lady.

Friend and Yale classmate Monty Woolley jumped in to help Porter "sell it", pretending to be a butler who explains why Madam can't keep a lunch appointment. In the previous 24 hours, Miss Otis was jilted and abandoned, located and killed her seducer, was arrested, jailed, and, about to be hanged by a mob, made a final, polite apology for being unable to keep her lunch appointment. This performance was so well received that the song evolved, "workshopped" with each subsequent cocktail party, many of which were at the Waldorf-Astoria suite of Elsa Maxwell, to whom Porter dedicated the song. The "smart set" that attended these parties, known to use wit or wisecracks to punctuate anecdotes and gossip, began using references to "Miss Otis" as a punchline. Porter incorporated the tale of "Miss Otis Regrets" into Hi Diddle Diddle later that year. In Porter's 1935 show Jubilee, an alternative lyric for the song "My Most Intimate Friend" goes "and Miss Otis thinks she'll be able to attend".

Truman Capote, in his article published in the November 1975 issue of Esquire Magazine, relates a story told to him by "Lady Coolbirth" about Cole Porter and an Italian waiter he had tried to seduce in his home. After kissing the man, Porter was told "that will cost $500" and escalated his advances until he was quoted $2000. Porter handed him a check as he said "Miss Otis regrets she's unable to lunch today. Now get out."

Thomas “Fats” Waller, in his song "Lulu's Back In Town", added with the same humour the verse "Mister Otis regrets, that he won't be aroun'."

== Notable versions ==
- Jimmie Daniels (1934, "Liberty Music Shop Presents Jimmie Daniels")
- Ethel Waters recorded a version of the song in New York City in 1934, released before the London debut of Hi Diddle Diddle. This was the only Porter song that Waters ever covered.
- Josh White (1944)
- Monty Woolley (1946, Night and Day)
- Marlene Dietrich (1951) as "Mein Mann ist verhindert"
- Ella Fitzgerald (1956) on her first in the long-running songbook series, Ella Fitzgerald Sings the Cole Porter Song Book
- Fred Astaire (1960) "Astaire Time" with Barrie Chase
- Bette Midler (1990)
- The Pogues + Kirsty MacColl (1990, Red Hot + Blue, as part of a medley that also includes "Just One of Those Things")
- Linda Ronstadt (2004)
- Van Morrison and Joey DeFrancesco (2018, You're Driving Me Crazy)
