= Free World (song) =

Single by Kirsty MacColl

from the album Kite
- B-side: "Closer to God?"
- Released: 20 March 1989
- Length: 2:35
- Label: Virgin
- Songwriter(s): Kirsty MacColl
- Producer(s): Steve Lillywhite

Kirsty MacColl singles chronology
"Fairytale of New York" (1987)	"Free World" (1989)	"Days" (1989)

"Free World" is a song by British singer and songwriter Kirsty MacColl, released on 20 March 1989 as the lead single from her second studio album, Kite. It was written by MacColl and produced by Steve Lillywhite. "Free World" reached number 43 in the UK Singles Chart and remained in the top 100 for seven weeks.

== Background ==
Speaking to the Evening Times in 1989, MacColl said of the song: "It's really about greed. But it's all part of the great divide between North and South. This Government has probably done more than any other to worsen it." She added in an interview with New Musical Express: "'Free World' is very direct and simple; hopefully it'll make people think a bit. The subject matter is Thatcherite Britain – you know, grab whatever you can and sod the little guy. That's a fashionable way of looking at things, and I don't agree with it."

== Release ==
MacColl's label, Virgin, had originally intended to release her version of the Kinks' "Days" as the lead single from Kite, but MacColl felt the first single had to be one which she wrote. She told James Bennett in 1994, "I was very proud of 'Free World' and was really glad that it became the first single." For its release as a single and improve its suitability for radio, the "shag it" in the line "Got to take it, got to grab it, got to get it up and shag it in this free world" was changed to "wag it".

== Music video ==
The song's music video was directed by Nick Willing.

== Critical reception ==
On its release, Jerry Smith of Music Week praised "Free World" as "a short, sharp and totally irresistible slice of effervescent pop" and added that "fairly fizzing, it surely can't fail". Andy Hurt of Sounds described it as a song which "commences with gusto with a capital GUST, but somehow manages to get lost in the vicinity of the chorus". He considered it to be "a nifty album track, should one materialise". Andrew Hirst of the Huddersfield Daily Examiner commented, "Seems ages since we last heard from Kirsty and judging by this frantic bout of acoustic monotony, it could be ages before we hear from her again."

In a review of Kite, Steve Hochman of Rolling Stone felt the song "slams home a warning of women's frustration in the world with U2-like frenzy". Stewart Mason of AllMusic described it as one of MacColl's "most combative songs". In the 2003 book The Rough Guide to Rock, authors Peter and Jonathan Buckley said of the song, "'Free World' is an unusually melodic example of an anti-Thatcherite diatribe. It's not the MacColl that casual visitors to the charts would recognize, but then that was her all over." The Trouser Press Guide to '90s Rock described the song as having a "full-bodied pop style".

== Track listing ==
7-inch single

1. "Free World" – 2:35
2. "Closer to God?" – 3:55

10-inch single (UK limited edition release)

1. "Free World" – 2:35
2. "Closer to God?" – 3:55
3. "The End of a Perfect Day" (Original Demo Version) – 3:13

12-inch single

1. "Free World" – 2:35
2. "You Just Haven't Earned It Yet Baby" – 2:44
3. "Closer to God?" – 3:55

CD single

1. "Free World" – 2:35
2. "You Just Haven't Earned It Yet Baby" – 2:44
3. "Closer to God?" – 3:55
4. "La Forêt De Mimosas" – 3:37

CD single (UK promo)

1. "Free World" – 2:35

== Personnel ==
- Kirsty MacColl – vocals
- Pete Glenister – acoustic guitar, electric guitar
- James Eller – double bass
- David Palmer – drums
- Paul Crowder – tambourine

Production

- Steve Lillywhite – producer
- Alan Douglas – engineer
- Mark Wallis – mixing

Other

- Bill Smith Studio, Kirsty MacColl – sleeve design
- Charles Dickins – photography
- XL Talent – management

== Charts ==
Chart (1989)	Peak position
Australian Singles Chart	162
UK Singles Chart	43
