= Kirsty MacColl =

British singer and songwriter (1959–2000)

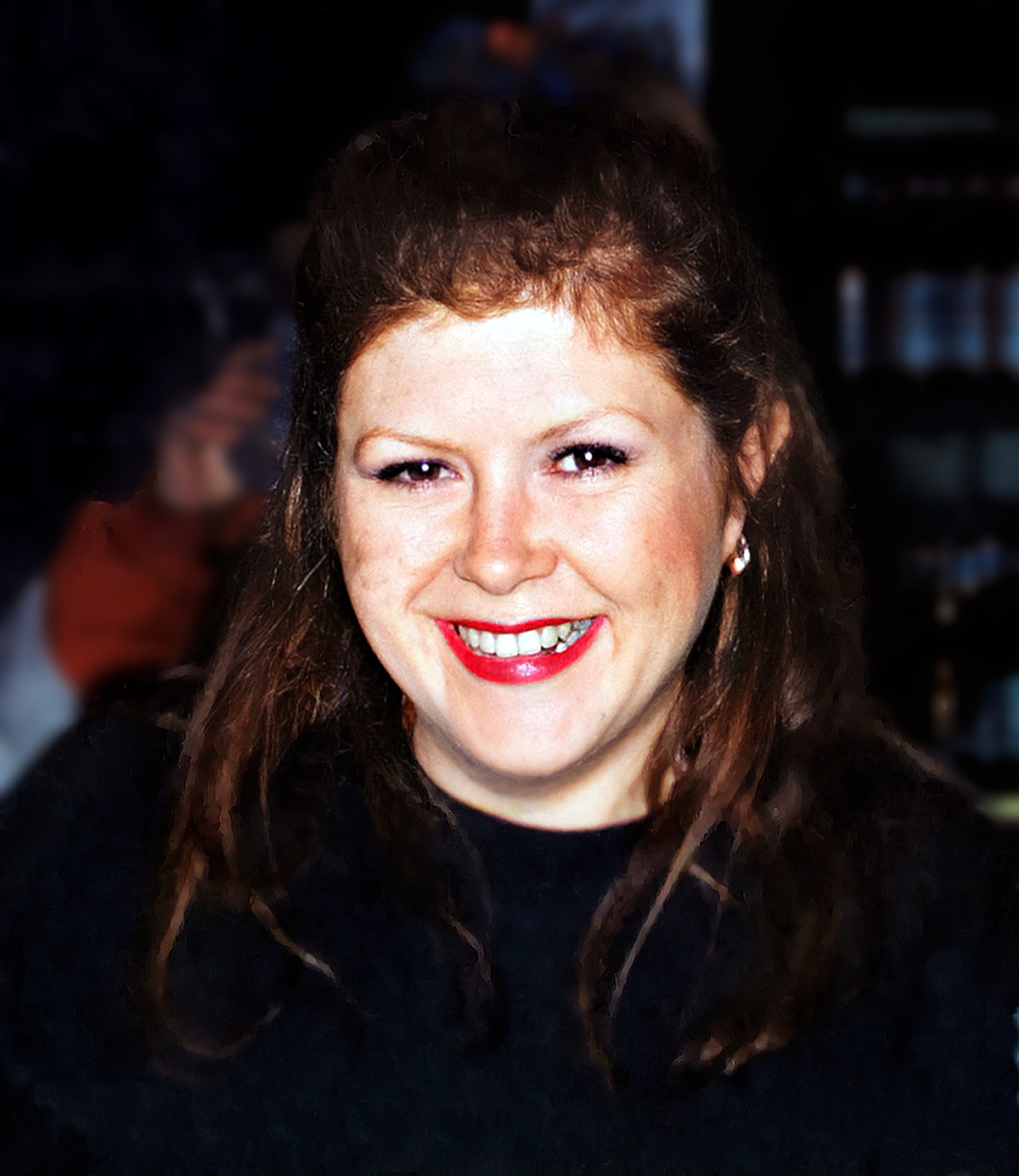
- MacColl in 1995

Background information
- Born: Kirsty Anna MacColl; 10 October 1959; Croydon, Surrey, England
- Died: 18 December 2000 (aged 41) Cozumel, Quintana Roo, Mexico
- Cause of death: Speedboat accident
- Genres: New wave; country; folk; alternative rock
- Occupations: Singer; songwriter
- Works: Kirsty MacColl discography
- Years active: 1978–2000
- Labels: Stiff; Polydor; IRS; ZTT; V2
- Spouse: Steve Lillywhite (m. 1984; div. 1997)
- Website: kirstymaccoll.com

Kirsty Anna MacColl (/məˈkɔːl/, mə-KAWL; 10 October 1959 – 18 December 2000) was a British singer and songwriter. The daughter of folk singer Ewan MacColl, she recorded several pop hits in the 1980s and 1990s, including "There's a Guy Works Down the Chip Shop Swears He's Elvis" and cover versions of Billy Bragg's "A New England" and the Kinks' "Days". She also sang on a number of recordings produced by her husband Steve Lillywhite, most notably "Fairytale of New York" by the Pogues. Her debut single, "They Don't Know", would have chart success a few years later when covered by Tracey Ullman. Her death in 2000 led to the "Justice for Kirsty" campaign.

== Early life ==
Kirsty Anna MacColl was born on 10 October 1959 in Croydon, Surrey (now in south London), the daughter of folk singer Ewan MacColl (1915–1989) and dancer Jean Newlove (1923–2017). Her father was born in England to Scottish parents. MacColl and her older brother, Hamish, grew up with their mother in Selsdon, in Croydon, where she attended Park Hill Primary School, Monks Hill High School, and John Newnham High School, making appearances in school plays. At the time of MacColl's birth, her father had been in a relationship with folk singer, multi-instrumentalist, and songwriter Peggy Seeger since 1956; the couple already had a son.

== Career ==
She came to notice when Chiswick Records released an EP by local punk rock band the Drug Addix (originally called Tooting Fruities) with MacColl on backing vocals (The Drug Addix Make A Record) under the pseudonym Mandy Doubt (1978). Stiff Records executives were not impressed with the band, but liked her and subsequently signed her to a solo deal. Her debut solo single "They Don't Know", released in 1979, peaked at number two on the Music Week airplay chart. However, a distributors' strike prevented copies of the single getting into record stores, and the single consequently failed to appear on the UK Singles Chart.

MacColl recorded a follow-up single, "You Caught Me Out", but felt she lacked Stiff Records's full backing, and left the label shortly before the song was to be released. The single was pulled, and only a few "white label" promo copies of the single are known to exist.

MacColl moved to Polydor Records in 1981. She had a number 14 UK hit with "There's a Guy Works Down the Chip Shop Swears He's Elvis", from her critically acclaimed debut album Desperate Character. In 1983, Polydor dropped her just as she had completed recording the songs for a planned second album (to be called Real) which used more synthesisers and had new wave-styled tracks. She returned to Stiff, where pop singles such as "Terry" and "He's on the Beach" were unsuccessful, but a cover of Billy Bragg's "A New England" in 1985 reached number 7 on the UK charts. This included two extra verses specially written for her by Bragg. Also around this time, MacColl wrote and performed the theme song "London Girls" for Channel 4's short-lived sitcom Dream Stuffing (1984).

In the United States, MacColl was perhaps best known as the writer of "They Don't Know". Tracey Ullman's recording of the song was a Billboard Top Ten hit. Ullman's version reached No. 8 on the US Hot 100 in April 1984 (and did even better in the UK, hitting No. 2 in September 1983). MacColl also sang back-up on the track, providing the "Baay-byy" because it was too high a pitch for Ullman. It was played over the closing credits of Ullman's HBO show Tracey Takes On... in 1996. Ullman also recorded three more of MacColl's songs, "You Broke My Heart In 17 Places" and "You Caught Me Out", as the title tracks of her first and second albums respectively, and "Terry" which was released as a single in 1985.

In 1986, MacColl contributed backing vocals for the Smiths song "Ask". She contributed backing vocals to the Simple Minds 1984 album, Sparkle in the Rain. Her vocals can be heard on the tracks "Speed Your Love to Me" and "Street Hassle".

When Stiff Records went bankrupt in 1986, MacColl was left unable to record in her own right, as no record company bought her contract from the official receiver. However, she had regular session work as a backing vocalist, and she frequently sang on records produced or engineered by her husband, Steve Lillywhite, including tracks for The Rolling Stones on the Dirty Work album, Robert Plant, the Smiths, Alison Moyet, Shriekback, Simple Minds, Talking Heads, Big Country, Anni-Frid Lyngstad (of ABBA) and the Wonder Stuff, among others. She appeared in the videos "Welcome to the Cheap Seats" for the Wonder Stuff and "(Nothing But) Flowers" for Talking Heads (along with Johnny Marr, ex-member of the Smiths). MacColl also set the track sequencing for U2's acclaimed breakthrough album The Joshua Tree, for which Lillywhite provided mixes.

MacColl re-emerged in the British charts in December 1987, reaching number 2 with the Pogues on "Fairytale of New York", singing a duet with Shane MacGowan. This led to her accompanying the Pogues on their British and European tour in 1988, an experience which she said helped her temporarily overcome her stage fright. In March 1989, MacColl sang backing vocals on the Happy Mondays' Hallelujah EP.

After the contract issue was resolved, MacColl returned to recording as a solo artist and received critical acclaim upon the release of Kite (LP) in 1989. The album was widely praised by critics, and featured collaborations with David Gilmour and Johnny Marr. MacColl's lyrics addressed life in Margaret Thatcher's Britain and addressed the vagaries of love in "Don't Come the Cowboy with Me Sonny Jim!". Although Kite contained many original compositions, MacColl's biggest chart success from the album was the cover of the Kinks' song "Days", which gave her a UK top 20 hit in July 1989. A bonus track on the CD version of Kite was a cover of the Smiths song "You Just Haven't Earned It Yet, Baby".

During this time, MacColl featured on the British TV sketch comedy French and Saunders, appearing as herself, singing songs including "15 Minutes" and "Don't Come the Cowboy with Me Sonny Jim!" (from Kite), "Still Life" (the B-side of the "Days" single), "Girls on Bikes" (a reworking of B-side "Am I Right?") and, with comedy duo Raw Sex, the Frank and Nancy Sinatra hit "Somethin' Stupid". She continued to write and record, releasing the album Electric Landlady in 1991. The album's title was coined by Johnny Marr as a play on the Jimi Hendrix album title Electric Ladyland. It included her most successful chart hit in North America, "Walking Down Madison", co-written with Marr and a top 30 hit in the UK. Despite the song's US chart success, Landlady was not a hit for Virgin Records and in 1992, when Virgin was sold to EMI, MacColl was dropped from the label.

MacColl released Titanic Days, informed by her failing marriage with Lillywhite, in 1993, but ZTT Records had agreed only to release the album as a "one-off" and declined to sign her to a contract. The album included "Soho Square", an original composition set in London. After MacColl's death a memorial bench was placed in Soho Square inscribed with a lyric from the song where fans could pay their respects. In 1995, she released two new singles on Virgin, "Caroline" and a cover of Lou Reed's "Perfect Day" (a duet with Evan Dando), together with the "best of" compilation Galore.

Galore became MacColl's only album to reach the top 10 in the UK Albums Chart, but neither of the new singles, nor a re-released "Days", made the Top 40. MacColl did not record again for several years; her frustration with the music business was exacerbated by a lengthy case of writer's block. MacColl herself admitted that she was ready to give up her music career and become an English teacher in South America.

In 1998, the album What Do Pretty Girls Do? was released, containing BBC Radio 1 live sessions (featuring Billy Bragg on two songs) that were broadcast between 1989 and 1995.

After several trips to Cuba and Brazil, MacColl recorded the world music-inspired (particularly Cuban and other Latin American forms) Tropical Brainstorm, which was released in 2000 to critical acclaim. It included the song "In These Shoes?", which garnered airplay in the US, was covered by Bette Midler and featured in the HBO show Sex and the City. After MacColl's death it was adopted by Catherine Tate as the theme tune for her BBC programme The Catherine Tate Show, and featured on the soundtrack to film Kinky Boots.

However, despite the relative success of Tropical Brainstorm, MacColl had been dropped by V2 Records prior to her death.

=== Television ===
MacColl featured regularly in the third series of the French and Saunders Show, a comedy show on the BBC. Unlike other guests on the show, she was not part of any of the sketches but sang her songs whilst performing as in a music video. She also made regular appearances on Jools Holland's TV shows, also on the BBC, singing during the 1995 Hootenanny a rendition of "Miss Otis Regrets" with the Pipes and Drums of the Irish Guards.

MacColl appeared in the 1991 Channel 4 historic musical fantasy The Ghosts of Oxford Street as Kitty Fisher, performing "Fairytale of New York" opposite Shane MacGowan as the Duke of York.

Her last television concert was recorded in Glasgow on 14 March 2000 and was broadcast by BBC, in December 2001, as Kirsty MacColl: The Boxed Set.

== Personal life ==
MacColl married producer Steve Lillywhite in 1984, and they had two sons, Jamie and Louis. They divorced in 1997.

At the time of her death, MacColl was in a relationship with musician James Knight.

== Death ==
In 2000, after she participated in the presentation of a radio programme for the BBC in Cuba, MacColl took a holiday in Cozumel, Mexico, with her sons and boyfriend. On 18 December 2000, she and her sons went diving at the Chankanaab reef, part of the Arrecifes de Cozumel National Park, in a designated diving area where watercraft were restricted from entering. With the group was a local veteran divemaster, Iván Díaz. As the group was surfacing from a dive, a powerboat moving at high speed entered the restricted area. MacColl saw the boat coming before her sons did. Louis, aged 13 at the time, was not in its path, but Jamie, then aged 15, was. She was able to push him out of the way (he sustained minor head and rib injuries), but she was struck by the powerboat, which ran over her. MacColl suffered severe chest and head injuries and died instantly, aged 41.

MacColl's body was repatriated to the United Kingdom and was cremated after a funeral service at Mortlake Crematorium in Kew. A memorial service for MacColl was held on 20 January 2001.

=== Aftermath ===
The powerboat involved in the collision was controlled by Guillermo González Nova, multimillionaire president of the Comercial Mexicana supermarket chain, who was on board with members of his family. The boat was owned by Carlos González Nova, brother of Guillermo and founder of Comercial Mexicana. An employee of Guillermo González Nova, boathand José Cen Yam, said he was in control of the boat at the time of the incident. Eyewitnesses said that Cen Yam was not at the controls and that the boat was travelling much faster than the speed of one knot that González Nova said.

Cen Yam was found guilty of culpable homicide and sentenced to two years and ten months in prison. He was allowed under Mexican law to pay a punitive fine of 1,034 pesos (about €63, £61 or US$90) in lieu of the prison sentence. He was also ordered to pay approximately US$2,150 in restitution to MacColl's family, an amount based on his wages. People who said they spoke to Cen Yam after the killing said he received money for taking the blame.

In a December 2025 interview with The Sun, ex-husband Lillywhite stated, "They said that it was a young kid driving [the speedboat], but no one believes that [...] I think they just didn't want to have an enormous lawsuit because he was one of the richest guys in Mexico".

=== Justice for Kirsty campaign ===
MacColl's family launched the Justice for Kirsty campaign in response to the events surrounding her death. Among the group's efforts:

- Lawyers for MacColl's family and the group campaigned for a judicial review into the events surrounding her death. They were in repeated contact with the Mexican government and made an application to the Inter-American Commission on Human Rights.
- MacColl's friends and family were critical of what they perceived as lack of cooperation from the Mexican authorities. In May 2006, Emilio Cortez Ramírez, a federal prosecutor in Cozumel, was found liable for breach of authority in his handling of MacColl's case.
- In 2004, the BBC showed a documentary by Olivia Lichtenstein titled Who Killed Kirsty MacColl?
- U2 frontman Bono, who was a friend of MacColl, spoke about the incident during a concert in Monterrey, Mexico, in February 2006. The Mexican government released a statement after the concert indicating it would take action.

On 20 August 2009, Carlos González Nova died at 92 of natural causes. In December of that year, the Justice for Kirsty Campaign Committee issued a statement announcing that the campaign was being terminated since it "was successful in achieving most of its aims" and "it is unlikely that any more could be achieved". The campaign's remaining funds were to be divided between two charities, Casa Alianza México and Cuba Music Solidarity, a gesture of which, the statement read, "Kirsty would have approved".

== Legacy ==
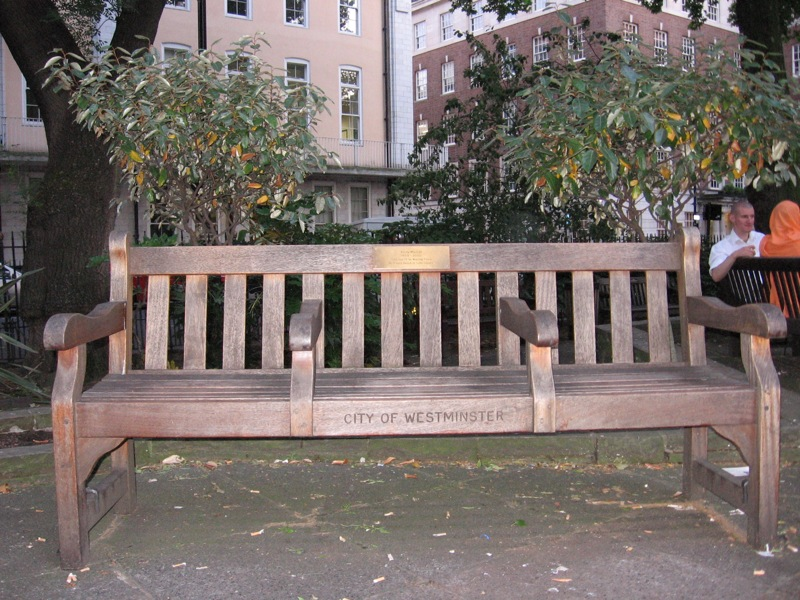
MacColl memorial bench in Soho Square

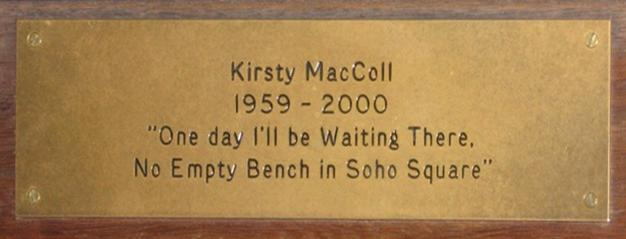
A close-up of the engraved lyrics

In 2001, a bench was placed by the southern entrance to London's Soho Square as a memorial to her, after a lyric from one of her most poignant songs: "One day I'll be waiting there / No empty bench in Soho Square". Every year on the Sunday nearest to MacColl's birthday, 10 October, fans from all over the world hold a gathering at the bench to pay tribute to her and sing her songs.

MacColl was honoured in 2002 with a memorial concert in London at the Royal Festival Hall, featuring a number of musicians who had worked with her or been influenced by her. A similar memorial concert took place on her birthday (10 October 2010) at the O2 Shepherd's Bush Empire, to support her favourite charity, The Music Fund for Cuba.

MacColl continues to receive media exposure; in 2004, Kirsty MacColl: The One and Only, a biography of MacColl by Karen O'Brien, was published. A retrospective three-CD set spanning her full career, From Croydon to Cuba, was released in 2005. Titanic Days was re-released in 2005 as a deluxe 2-CD set, and Kite and Electric Landlady were also remastered and rereleased with additional tracks. Her first album, Desperate Character, was given its first CD issue in 2012 on the Salvo label. On 7 August 2005, The Best of Kirsty MacColl, a single-disc compilation that included a "new" single, "Sun on the Water", made its debut on the UK album charts at number 17, climbing to No. 12 a week later.

MacColl's collaboration with the Pogues, "Fairytale of New York", remains a Christmas favourite. In 2004, 2005 and 2006, it was voted favourite Christmas song in a poll by music video channel VH1. The song was re-released in the UK in December 2005, with proceeds being split between the Justice for Kirsty Campaign and charities for the homeless. The re-release reached number 3 on the UK charts, and spent five weeks in the top 75 over the Christmas and New Year period. It reached the top 10 for the third time in its history in 2006, peaking at number 6, and charted again in December 2007. The song has also made the Top 20 in subsequent years, and has now spent more time in the top 20 than any other song. With the exception of the 2005 and 2012 re-releases, the seasonal re-charting in the 21st century is due to download sales, and not due to further releases (download sales counting toward the singles chart since 2005). A 7" single was produced in 2012 to mark the 25th anniversary of its original appearance (Rhino Records WEA400), backed with an instrumental version.

In 2023, a plaque was unveiled at her former home in Ealing, west London, by her son Louis. MacColl lived at the address - 48 Mount Park Road, W5 - from 1985 until her death, recording her final album there.

Following the death of Shane MacGowan on 30 November 2023, "Fairytale of New York" went to No. 1 in Ireland on Spotify. On 13 December 2023, the Pogues reissued the song as a charity 7-inch single in tribute to MacGowan and to benefit the Dublin Simon Community, an organisation fighting homelessness.

In January 2024, a best-of compilation of MacColl's music was released by Demon Records, titled Kirsty MacColl: Free World – The Best Of Kirsty MacColl 1979–2000. Described as the first-ever best-of compilation of MacColl's music released on vinyl, it was released as two limited-edition yellow LPs.

== Awards and nominations ==
Award	Year	Nominee(s)	Category	Result	Ref.
Ivor Novello Awards	1992	"Walking Down Madison"	Best Contemporary Song	Nominated	
Ivor Novello Awards	1995	"Dear John"	Most Performed Work	Nominated	

== Discography ==
- Desperate Character (1981)
- Kite (1989)
- Electric Landlady (1991)
- Titanic Days (1993)
- Tropical Brainstorm (2000)
- Real (2023)

== Bibliography ==
- MacColl, Jean (2008). Sun on the Water: The Brilliant Life and Tragic Death of Kirsty MacColl. London: John Blake. ISBN 978-1-84454-549-0. OCLC 434559942.
- O'Brien, Karen (2004). Kirsty MacColl: The One and Only. London: Andre Deutsch. ISBN 0-233-00070-4. OCLC 308622623.
