= There's a Guy Works Down the Chip Shop Swears He's Elvis =

Single by Kirsty MacColl

from the album Desperate Character
- B-side: Hard To Believe; There's a Guy... (Country version)
- Released: May 1981
- Genre: Country rock; rockabilly; novelty
- Label: Polydor
- Songwriters: Kirsty MacColl; Philip Rambow
- Producer: Barry Farmer

Kirsty MacColl singles chronology
"Keep Your Hands Off My Baby" (1981)	"There's a Guy Works Down the Chip Shop Swears He's Elvis" (1981)	"See That Girl" (1981)

"There's a Guy Works Down the Chip Shop Swears He's Elvis" is a song by British singer-songwriter Kirsty MacColl, which was released as the lead single from her debut studio album Desperate Character. The song was written by MacColl and Philip Rambow, and produced by Barry Farmer. It reached No. 14 in the UK Singles Chart and remained in the charts for nine weeks. In the US, the song's British chip shop reference was changed to truck stop.

Norwegian singer Elisabeth Andreasson covered the song on her 1981 country album Angel of the Morning, with lyrics in Swedish by Hasse Olsson as "Killen ner' på Konsum svär att han är Elvis" ("The guy down Konsum swears he's Elvis").

== Critical reception ==
Upon its release, Simon Ludgate of Record Mirror considered the song to be a "catchy little number" and "ultimately a tale of betrayal". He added, "Imagine Dave Edmunds singing a song by Chris Sievey and you'll get the idea". Tony Jasper of Music Week noted that the "fast tempo, country-stylised" song had chart potential with its "long amusing title [that] draws attention" and an "arresting lyric". Fred Dellar of Smash Hits felt it was "just an average sample of rocked-up country music" but commented on the "wonderful" title.

== Track listing ==
7" single

1. "There's a Guy Works Down the Chip Shop Swears He's Elvis" - 3:07
2. "Hard to Believe" - 2:19
3. "There's a Guy Works Down the Chip Shop Swears He's Elvis" (Country version) - 3:44

7" single (US release)

1. "There's a Guy Works Down the Chip Shop Swears He's Elvis" - 3:45
2. "Over You" - 2:35

== Personnel ==
Production

- Barry Farmer - producer, mixing
- Kirsty MacColl - mixing

Other

- Rob O'Conner - sleeve design
- Chalkie Davies - front cover photography
- Frank Murray - front cover model
- Alan Ballard - back cover photography

== Charts ==
Chart (1981)	Peak position
Belgium (Ultratop 50 Flanders)	37
Netherlands (Dutch Top 40)	16
Netherlands (Single Top 100)	31
Sweden (Sverigetopplistan)	13
UK Singles (Official Charts)	14
