= List of songs recorded by the Pogues =

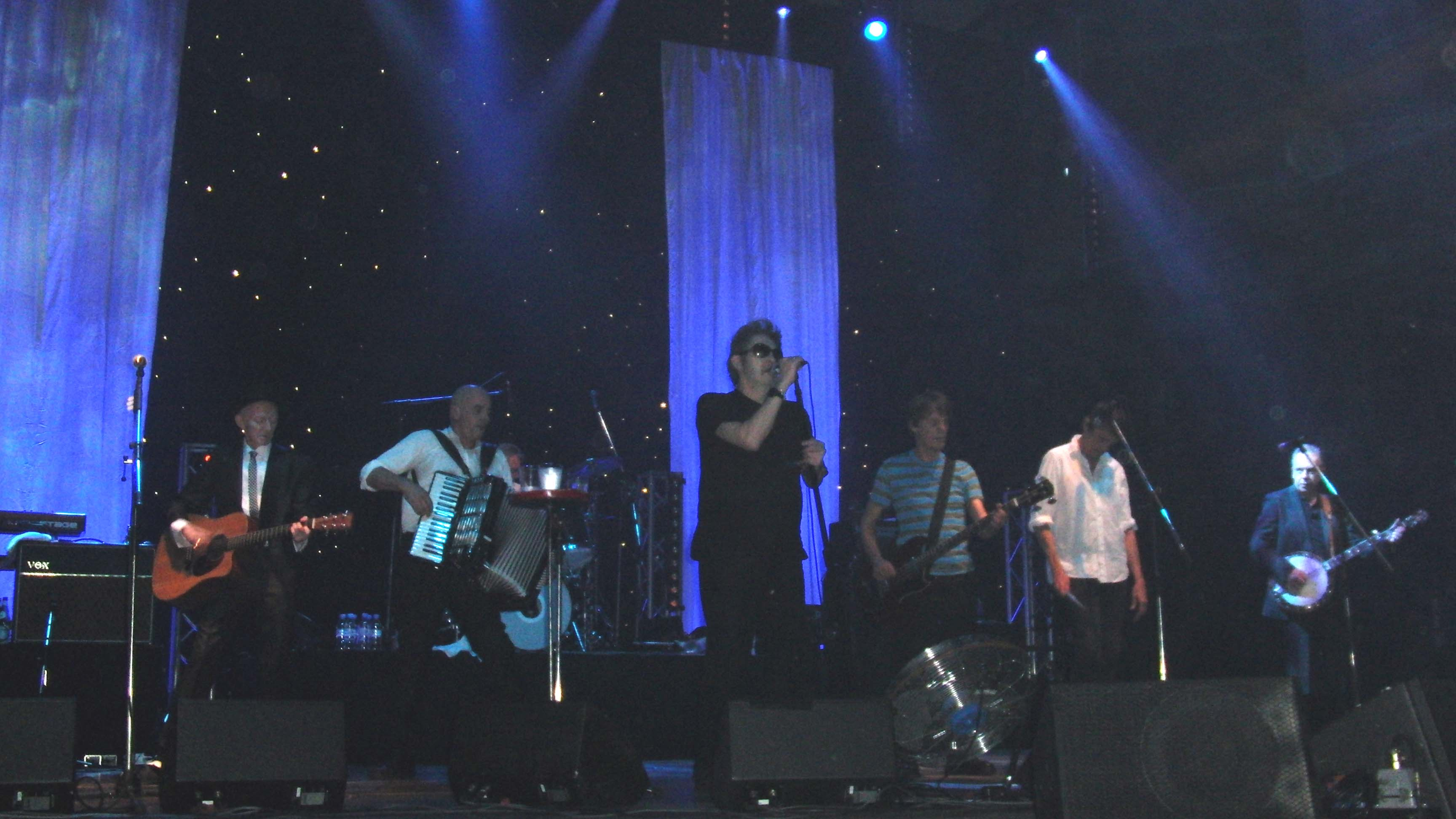
The Pogues performing in Munich in 2011. From left to right: Philip Chevron, James Fearnley, Andrew Ranken, Shane MacGowan, Darryl Hunt, Spider Stacy and Jem Finer.

The Anglo-Irish Celtic punk band the Pogues have recorded songs for seven studio albums as well as one extended play (EP), twenty singles, and various other projects. Having played together occasionally since the late 1970s, Shane MacGowan (vocals), Peter "Spider" Stacy (tin whistle), and Jem Finer (banjo) formed the band in 1982 along with James Fearnley (accordion). The group initially used the name Pogue Mahone, an anglicisation of the Irish phrase póg mo thóin, meaning "kiss my arse". Cait O'Riordan (bass guitar) and Andrew Ranken (drums) had joined by the time of the band's debut album, Red Roses for Me (1984). The album mixed the band's interpretations of traditional British and Irish folk songs such as "Poor Paddy Works on the Railway" and "Greenland Whale Fisheries" with original tracks written by MacGowan, which centred primarily on drinking culture, the darker side of London life, and the experiences of Irish emigrants. The band's second album, Rum Sodomy & the Lash (1985), continued such themes on tracks such as "The Old Main Drag", which depicts a teenager arriving in London and descending into addiction and sex work, and also included cover versions of songs by the folk singers Ewan MacColl and Eric Bogle.

If I Should Fall from Grace with God (1988) incorporated a wider range of musical styles, including Turkish and Spanish influences on the tracks "Turkish Song of the Damned" and "Fiesta", respectively, and songs written by newer band members Philip Chevron and Terry Woods. The album also included the song "Fairytale of New York", originally envisaged as a duet between MacGowan and O'Riordan but eventually recorded with Kirsty MacColl after O'Riordan left the band in 1986. The song reached number 2 in the UK singles chart and has come to be regarded as a Christmas classic, regularly placing highly in polls of the greatest seasonal songs of all time. The track "Streets of Sorrow/Birmingham Six", from the same album, proved controversial for its lyrical support of the Birmingham Six, a group of Irishmen imprisoned for terrorism offences in relation to the 1974 Birmingham pub bombings. MacGowan's role in songwriting within the band continued to reduce with their fourth album, Peace and Love (1989), which for the first time featured more songs written by other members of the band than by him; the album was also the band's first not to feature versions of any traditional songs. Although MacGowan again wrote the majority of the songs on the Pogues' next album, Hell's Ditch (1990), it proved to be his last with the band, as he was expelled from the group the following year due to his unreliability and substance abuse issues. Stacy took over as lead vocalist for the group's sixth album, Waiting for Herb (1993), for which Finer wrote the majority of the songs. After the 1996 album Pogue Mahone, which included cover versions of songs originally recorded by Ronnie Lane and Bob Dylan, the band broke up, although they reunited for live shows, with MacGowan again in the line-up, from 2001 onwards. MacGowan died in 2023, but the following year several of the remaining members announced their first live performances in over a decade.

The band also recorded songs that did not appear on their seven studio albums, including many which appeared as the B-sides of singles. They contributed original songs to the soundtracks of the films Sid and Nancy (1986) and Straight to Hell (1987), in the latter of which several members of the band also acted. On multiple occasions, they recorded collaborations with Kirsty MacColl and with the Irish band the Dubliners. In 2008, more than forty previously unreleased songs recorded by the band throughout their career were made available in the box set Just Look Them Straight in the Eye and Say... Pogue Mahone!!

== Songs ==
Key
†	Indicates single release

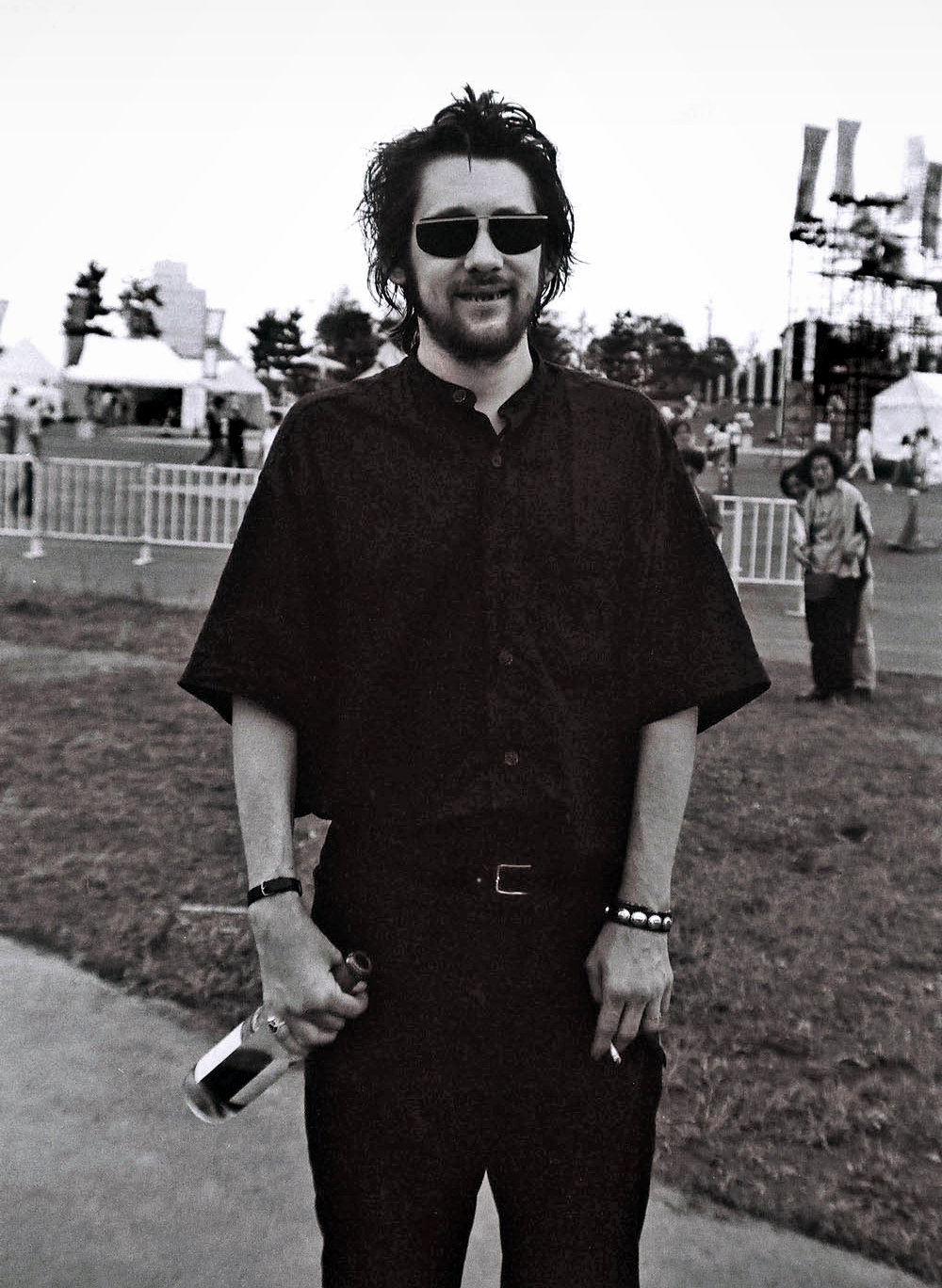
Shane MacGowan wrote the majority of the band's original songs.

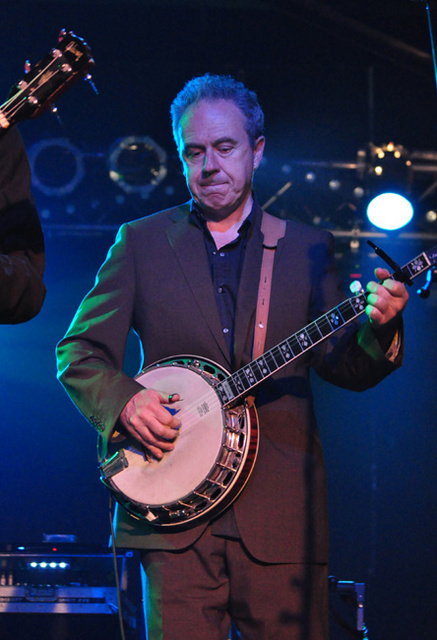
Jem Finer co-wrote the band's highest-charting single, "Fairytale of New York".

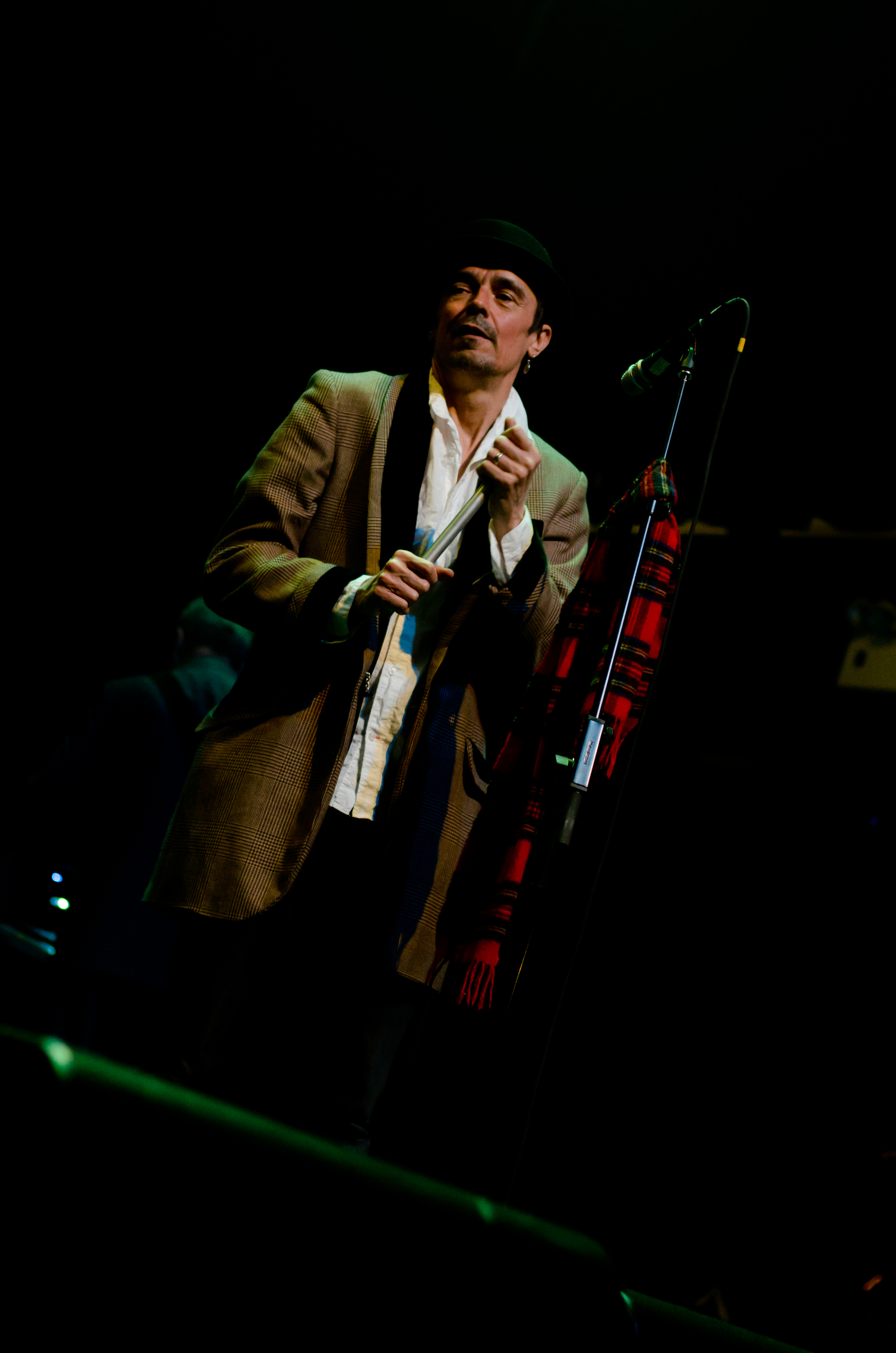
Spider Stacy wrote the song "Jack's Heroes", a tribute to the Republic of Ireland national football team.

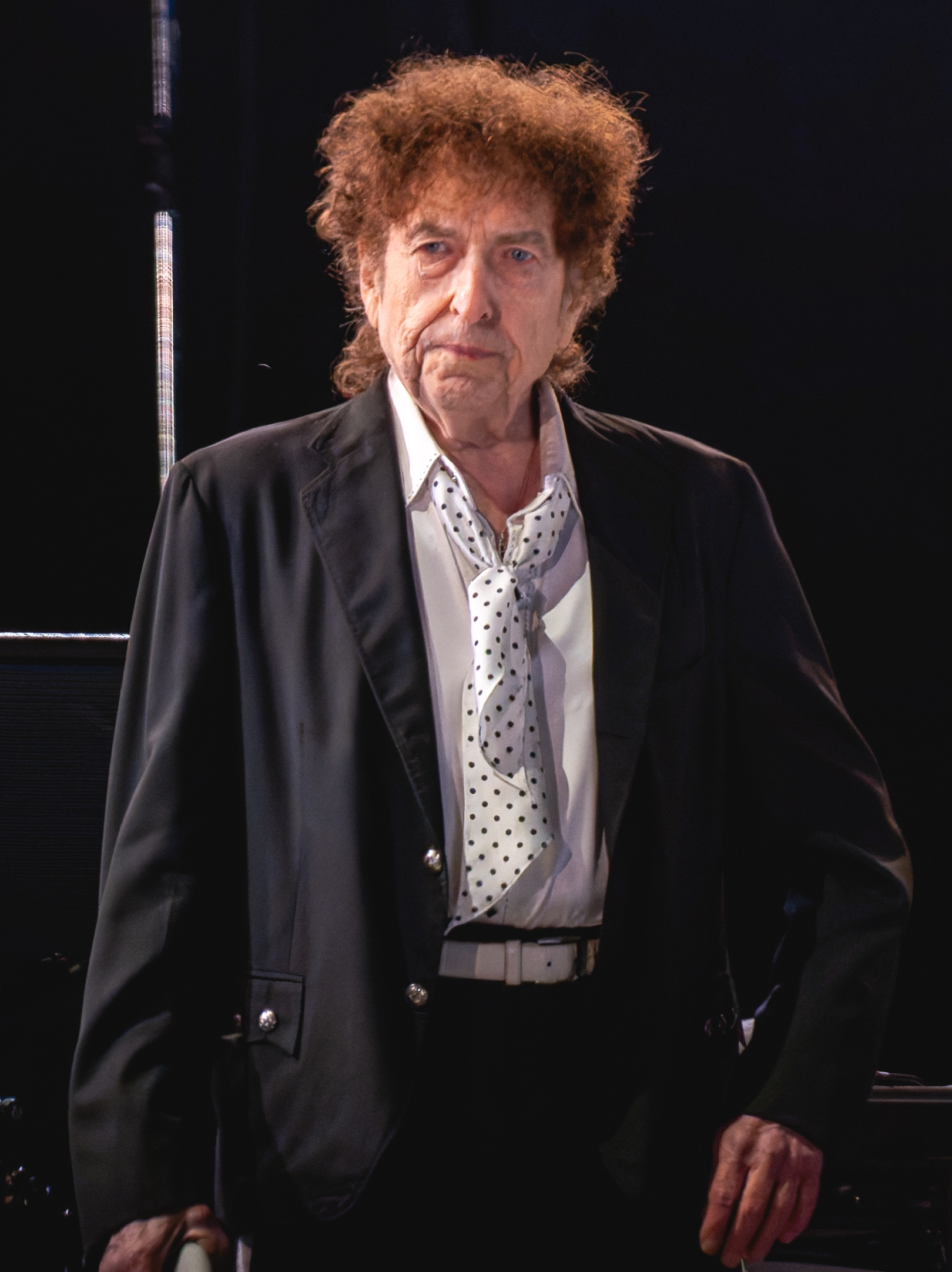
The band recorded a version of Bob Dylan's "When the Ship Comes In" on their final studio album.

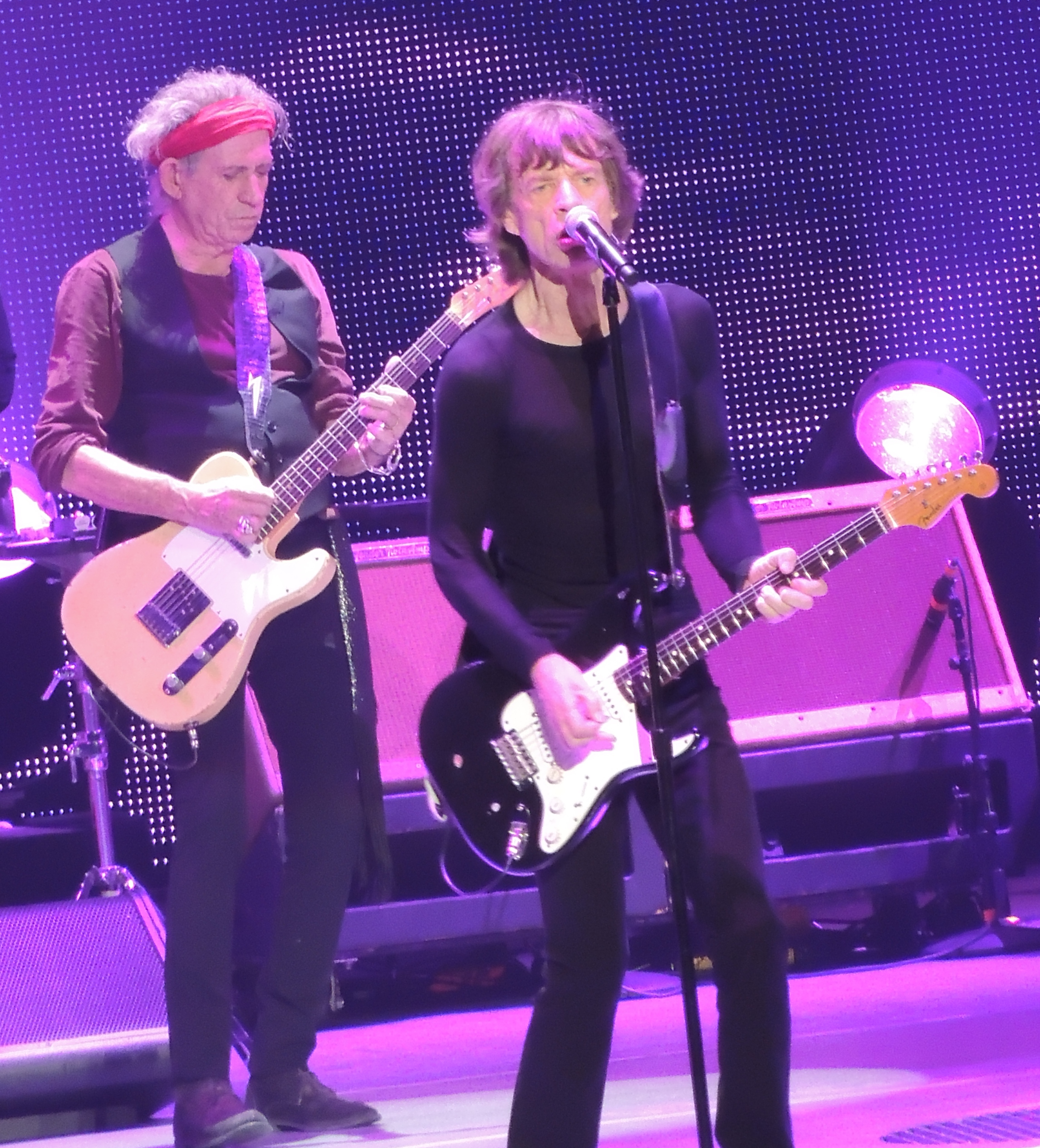
The Pogues covered the song "Honky Tonk Women", written by Keith Richards (left) and Mick Jagger of the Rolling Stones.

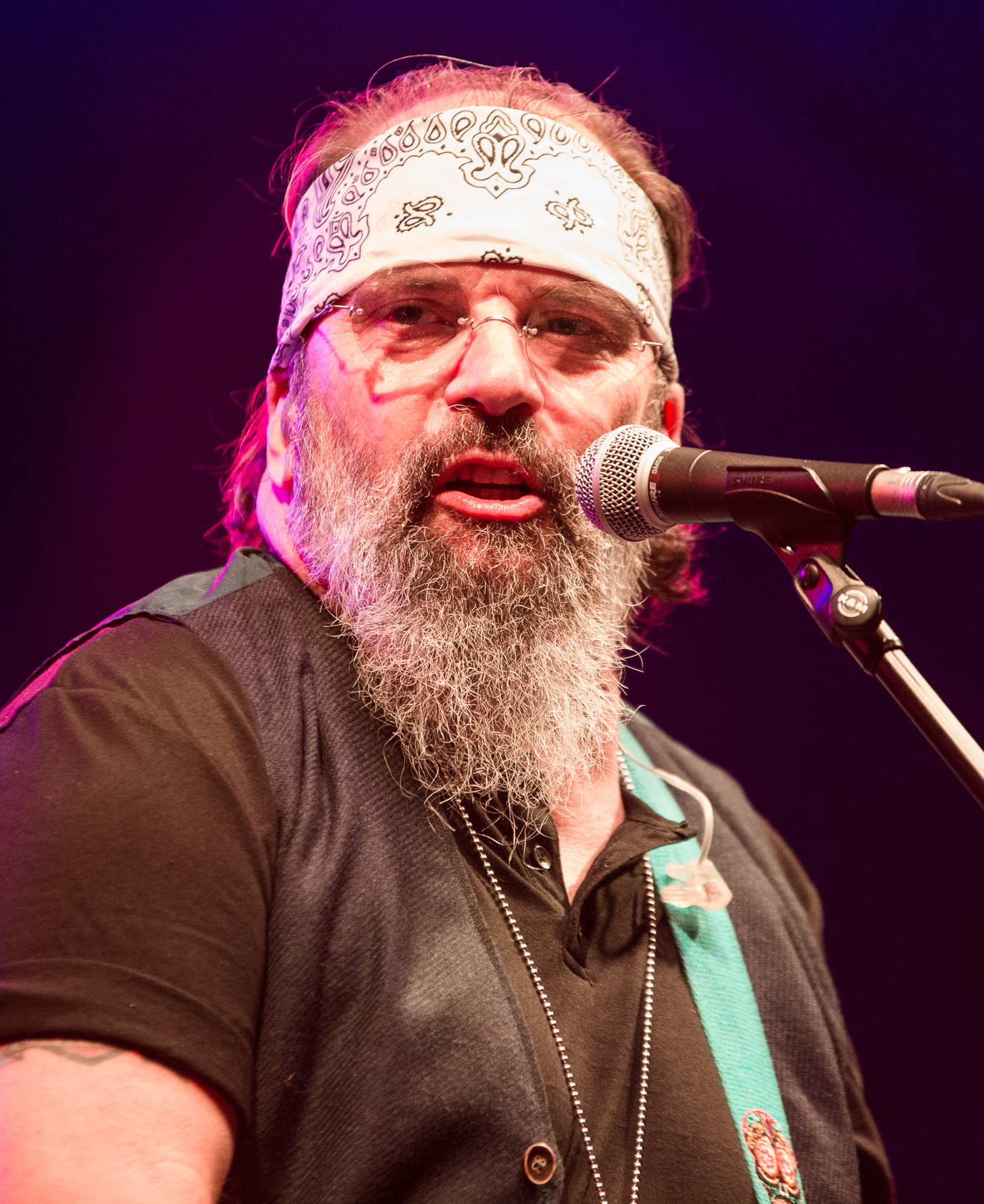
The Pogues collaborated with Steve Earle on the track "Johnny Come Lately" on Earle's album Copperhead Road.

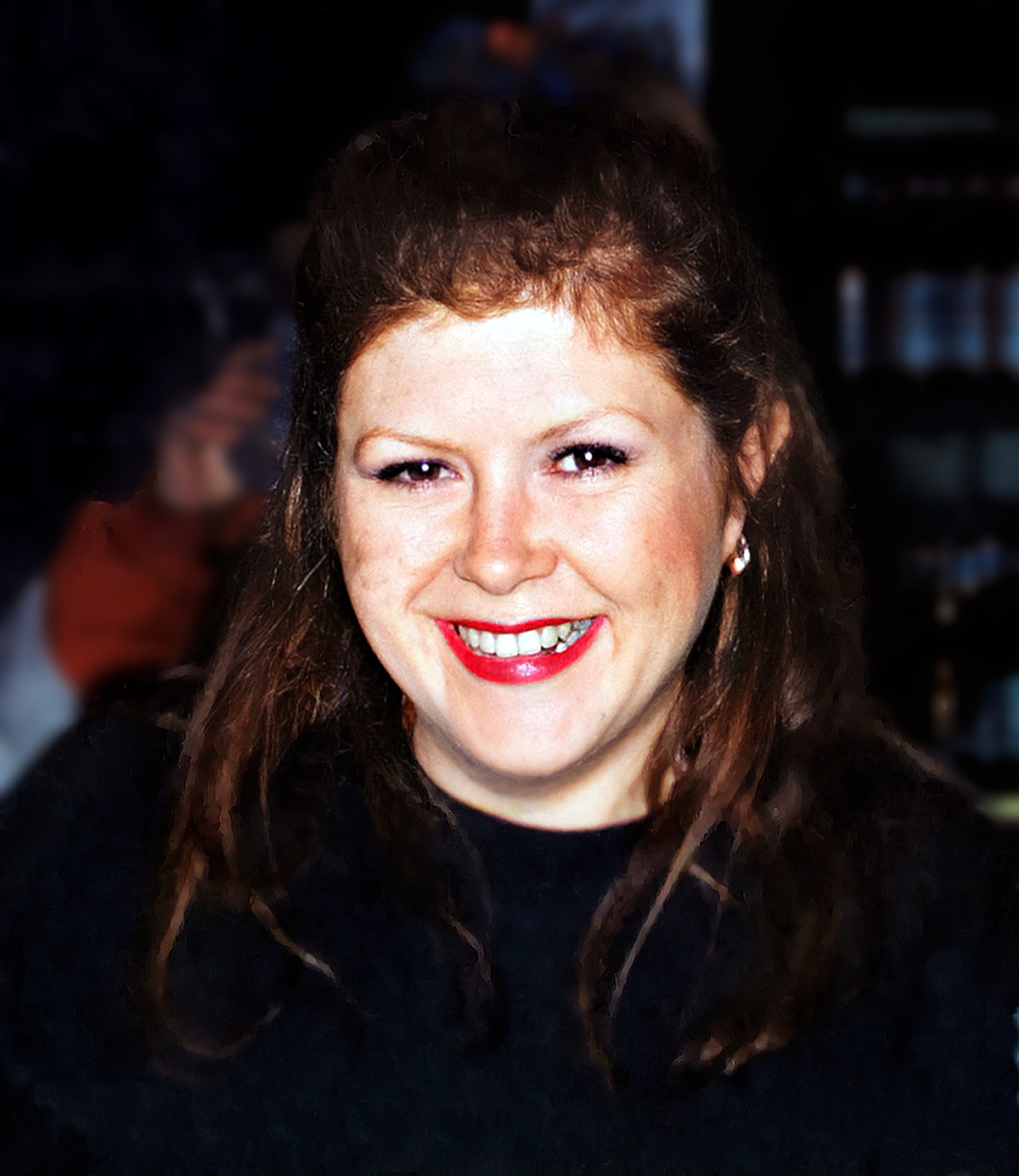
The Pogues collaborated on multiple occasions with Kirsty MacColl.

Name of song, credited writer(s), originating album, and year of release
Song	Writer(s)	Album	Year	Ref(s).
"5 Green Queens and Jean"	Jem Finer; Shane MacGowan	Hell's Ditch	1990	
"Afro-Cuban Be-Bop" (with Joe Strummer)	Joe Strummer	None (Note: "Afro-Cuban Be-Bop" originally appeared on the soundtrack of the film I Hired a Contract Killer. It was the B-side of a 1990 single which was only released in Finland, with the track credited to Joe Strummer and the Astro-Physicians. It was subsequently released in the Just Look Them Straight in the Eye and Say... Pogue Mahone!! box set.)	1990	
"Aisling"	Shane MacGowan	Just Look Them Straight in the Eye and Say... Pogue Mahone!!	2008 (Note: Previously unreleased track made available for the first time in the Just Look Them Straight in the Eye and Say... Pogue Mahone!! box set)	
"All the Tears That I Cried" (with Kirsty MacColl)	Kirsty MacColl; Mark E. Nevin	None (Note: "All the Tears That I Cried" was the B-side of Kirsty MacColl's single "My Affair". It was later included in the Just Look Them Straight in the Eye and Say... Pogue Mahone!! box set and on the 2012 re-issue of MacColl's album Electric Landlady.)	1991	
"Amadie"	Andrew Ranken	Pogue Mahone	1996	
"And the Band Played Waltzing Matilda"	Eric Bogle	Rum Sodomy & the Lash (Note: A different recording of the song, listed as "The Band Played Waltzing Matilda", was released as the B-side of the "Dark Streets of London" single in 1984. This version was added to the 2004 re-issue of the Red Roses for Me album.)	1985	
"Anniversary"	Jem Finer	Pogue Mahone	1996	
"The Aria"	Jem Finer	Just Look Them Straight in the Eye and Say... Pogue Mahone!!	2008	
"The Auld Triangle"	Brendan Behan	Red Roses for Me	1984	
"The Balinalee"	Shane MacGowan	Just Look Them Straight in the Eye and Say... Pogue Mahone!!	2008	
"Bastard Landlord"	Jem Finer	None (Note: "Bastard Landlord" was released as the B-side of the "Summer in Siam" single in 1990. It was added to the 2004 re-issue of the Hell's Ditch album.)	1990	
"The Battle March Medley"	Terry Woods	If I Should Fall from Grace with God	1988	
"The Battle of Brisbane"	Shane MacGowan	Red Roses for Me	1984	
"Big City"	Darryl Hunt	Waiting for Herb	1993	
"Big Question Mark"	Jem Finer	Straight to Hell (soundtrack album) (Note: This song is one of several from the soundtrack of Straight to Hell which appeared only on the expanded version of the soundtrack album, released in 2004.)	1987	
"Billy's Bones"	Shane MacGowan	Rum Sodomy & the Lash	1985	
"The Black Dogs Ditch"	Terry Woods	Just Look Them Straight in the Eye and Say... Pogue Mahone!!	2008	
"Blue Heaven"	Philip Chevron; Darryl Hunt	Peace and Love	1989	
"Boat Train"	Shane MacGowan	Peace and Love	1989	
"The Body of an American"	Shane MacGowan	Poguetry in Motion (EP) (Note: All four tracks on the Poguetry in Motion EP were added to the 2004 re-issue of the Rum Sodomy & the Lash album.)	1986	
"Bolero del Perro Listo"	James Fearnley	Straight to Hell (soundtrack album)	1987	
"Bottle of Smoke"	Jem Finer; Shane MacGowan	If I Should Fall from Grace with God	1988	
"Bowery Snax/Spiked"	Jem Finer; Philip Chevron	Just Look Them Straight in the Eye and Say... Pogue Mahone!!	2008	
"Boys from the County Hell" †	Shane MacGowan	Red Roses for Me	1984	
"Bright Lights"	Jem Finer	Pogue Mahone	1996	
"The Broad Majestic Shannon"	Shane MacGowan	If I Should Fall from Grace with God	1988	
"Call My Name"	Darryl Hunt	Just Look Them Straight in the Eye and Say... Pogue Mahone!!	2008	
"Connemara, Let's Go!" (Note: "Connemara, Let's Go!" is an early version of the track released as "Down in the Ground Where the Dead Men Go".)	Shane MacGowan	Just Look Them Straight in the Eye and Say... Pogue Mahone!!	2008	
"Cotton Fields"	Shane MacGowan	Peace and Love	1989	
"The Curse of Love"	Jem Finer	None (Note: "The Curse of Love" and "Infinity" were released as the B-sides of the "Sayonara" single in 1990. They were added to the 2004 re-issue of the Hell's Ditch album.)	1990	
"Danny Boy"	Frederic Weatherly	Straight to Hell (soundtrack album)	1987	
"Dark Streets of London" †	Shane MacGowan	Red Roses for Me	1984	
"Dingle Regatta"	Shane MacGowan	Red Roses for Me	1984	
"Dirty Old Town" †	Ewan MacColl	Rum Sodomy & the Lash	1985	
"Do You Believe in Magic"	John Sebastian; Zal Yanovsky	Just Look Them Straight in the Eye and Say... Pogue Mahone!!	2008	
"The Donegal Express/The Hen and the Cock are in Carrickmacross"	Shane MacGowan; Traditional	Just Look Them Straight in the Eye and Say... Pogue Mahone!!	2008	
"Down All the Days"	Shane MacGowan	Peace and Love	1989	
"Down in the Ground Where the Dead Men Go"	Shane MacGowan	Red Roses for Me	1984	
"Driving Through the City"	Shane MacGowan	Just Look Them Straight in the Eye and Say... Pogue Mahone!!	2008	
"Drunken Boat"	James Fearnley	Waiting for Herb	1993	
"Eve of Destruction"	P. F. Sloan	Just Look Them Straight in the Eye and Say... Pogue Mahone!!	2008	
"Everyman is a King"	Terry Woods; Ron Kavana	None (Note: "Everyman is a King" and "Star of the County Down" were released as B-sides of the "White City" single in 1989. They were added to the 2004 re-issue of the Peace and Love album.)	1989	
"Eyes of an Angel"	Jem Finer	None (Note: "Eyes of an Angel" was released as the B-side of the "How Come" single in 1996. It was added to the 2004 re-issue of the Pogue Mahone album.)	1996	
"Fairytale of New York" (with Kirsty MacColl) †	Jem Finer; Shane MacGowan	If I Should Fall from Grace with God	1987 (Note: "Fairytale of New York" was released as a single in late 1987 ahead of the release of the "If I Should Fall from Grace with God" album early the following year.)	
"Fiesta" †	Jem Finer; Shane MacGowan	If I Should Fall from Grace with God	1988	
"First Day of Forever"	Philip Chevron	None (Note: "First Day of Forever" was released as the B-side of the "Tuesday Morning" single in 1993. It was added to the 2004 re-issue of the Waiting for Herb album.)	1993	
"Four O'Clock in the Morning"	Andrew Ranken	Pogue Mahone	1996	
"Garbo (aka in and Out)"	Jem Finer; Shane MacGowan	Garbo (soundtrack album)	1992	
"Gartloney Rats"	Terry Woods	Peace and Love	1989	
"The Gentleman Soldier"	Traditional	Rum Sodomy & the Lash	1985	
"The Ghost of a Smile"	Shane MacGowan	Hell's Ditch	1990	
"Girl from the Wadi Hammamat"	Jem Finer; Andrew Ranken	Waiting for Herb	1993	
"Glued Up and Speeding"	Spider Stacy	Just Look Them Straight in the Eye and Say... Pogue Mahone!!	2008	
"The Good, the Bad and the Ugly"	Ennio Morricone	Straight to Hell (soundtrack album)	1987	
"Goodnight Irene"	Traditional	Just Look Them Straight in the Eye and Say... Pogue Mahone!!	2008	
"Got A Lot Of Lovin' To Do"	Aaron Schroeder; Ben Weisman	The Last Temptation of Elvis	2008	
"Greenland Whale Fisheries"	Traditional	Red Roses for Me	1984	
"Gridlock"	Jem Finer; Andrew Ranken	Peace and Love	1989	
"Harmonicas"	The Pogues	Straight to Hell (soundtrack album)	1987	
"Haunted" †	Shane MacGowan	Sid and Nancy (soundtrack album)	1986	
"Haunting"	Terry Woods	Waiting for Herb	1993	
"Hell's Ditch"	Jem Finer; Shane MacGowan	Hell's Ditch	1990	
"Honky Tonk Women" †	Mick Jagger; Keith Richards	None (Note: "Honky Tonk Women" (mis-spelt as "Honky Tonk Woman") was released as the B-side of the non-album "Yeah Yeah Yeah Yeah Yeah" single in 1988. It was released as a single in its own right (with its title spelt correctly) in 1992, and added to the 2004 re-issue of the "Peace and Love" album.)	1988	
"Hot Asphalt"	Ewan MacColl	Just Look Them Straight in the Eye and Say... Pogue Mahone!!	2008	
"Hot Dogs with Everything"	Shane MacGowan	None (Note: "Hot Dogs with Everything" was released as the B-side of the "Haunted" single in 1986. It was later included in the Just Look Them Straight in the Eye and Say... Pogue Mahone!! box set.)	1986	
"How Come"	Ronnie Lane; Kevin Westlake	Pogue Mahone	1996	
"House of the Gods"	Shane MacGowan	Hell's Ditch	1990	
"If I Should Fall from Grace with God" †	Shane MacGowan	If I Should Fall from Grace with God	1988	
"I Fought the Law" (with Joe Strummer)	Sonny Curtis	Just Look Them Straight in the Eye and Say... Pogue Mahone!!	2008	
"I'm a Man You Don't Meet Every Day"	Traditional	Rum Sodomy & the Lash	1985	
"Infinity"	Shane MacGowan	None	1990	
"The Irish Rover" † (with the Dubliners)	Traditional	25 Years Celebration (Note: "The Irish Rover" and "Mountain Dew" were added to the 2004 re-issue of the "If I Should Fall From Grace with God" album.)	1987	
"Jack's Heroes" † (with the Dubliners)	Spider Stacy	None (Note: "Jack's Heroes" and "Whiskey in the Jar" were released as a double A-sided non-album single in 1990. Both tracks were added to the 2004 re-issue of the Hell's Ditch album.)	1990	
"Japan"	Pharoah Sanders	Just Look Them Straight in the Eye and Say... Pogue Mahone!!	2008	
"JB 57"	Jem Finer	Just Look Them Straight in the Eye and Say... Pogue Mahone!!	2008	
"Jesse James"	Traditional	Rum Sodomy & the Lash	1985	
"Johnny Come Lately" (with Steve Earle)	Steve Earle	Copperhead Road	1988	
"Johnny Was" (Note: Credited to Sexy Bongo, an assumed name under which members of the band acted as their own support act for one concert)	Andrew Ranken; Darryl Hunt; James Fearnley; Jem Finer; Philip Chevron	Just Look Them Straight in the Eye and Say... Pogue Mahone!!	2008	
"Junk"	Jem Finer	Sid and Nancy (soundtrack album)	1986	
"The Kerry Polka"	Traditional	Just Look Them Straight in the Eye and Say... Pogue Mahone!!	2008	
"Kitty"	Traditional	Red Roses for Me	1984	
"L'Amoria"	Philip Chevron	Straight to Hell (soundtrack album)	1987	
"The Last of McGee"	Jem Finer	Just Look Them Straight in the Eye and Say... Pogue Mahone!!	2008	
"The Leaving of Liverpool"	Traditional	None (Note: "The Leaving of Liverpool" and "The Wild Rover" were released as B-sides of the "Sally MacLennane" single in 1985. They were added to the 2004 re-issue of the Red Roses for Me album.)	1985	
"The Limerick Rake"	Traditional	None (Note: "The Limerick Rake" was released as the B-side of the non-album "Yeah Yeah Yeah Yeah Yeah" single in 1988. It was added to the 2004 re-issue of the Peace and Love album.)	1988	
"Living in a World Without Her"	Darryl Hunt; James McNally	Pogue Mahone	1996	
"London Calling" (with Joe Strummer)	Joe Strummer; Mick Jones	Just Look Them Straight in the Eye and Say... Pogue Mahone!!	2008	
"London Girl"	Shane MacGowan	Poguetry in Motion (EP)	1986	
"London You're a Lady"	Shane MacGowan	Peace and Love	1989	
"Long Cool Day in Hell"	Jem Finer	Straight to Hell (soundtrack album)	1987	
"Lorca's Novena"	Jem Finer; Shane MacGowan	Hell's Ditch	1990	
"Lorelei"	Philip Chevron	Peace and Love	1989	
"Love Theme from Sid and Nancy"	Jem Finer	Just Look Them Straight in the Eye and Say... Pogue Mahone!!	2008	
"Love You 'Till the End"	Darryl Hunt	Pogue Mahone	1996	
"Lullaby of London"	Shane MacGowan	If I Should Fall from Grace with God	1988	
"Lust for Vomit"	Shane MacGowan	Just Look Them Straight in the Eye and Say... Pogue Mahone!!	2008	
"Maggie May"	Martin Quittenton; Rod Stewart	Just Look Them Straight in the Eye and Say... Pogue Mahone!!	2008	
"Maidrin Rua"	Traditional	Hell's Ditch	1990	
"Medley: The Recruiting Sergeant/ The Rocky Road to Dublin/The Galway Races" (Note: A version of "The Rocky Road to Dublin" as a stand-alone track was released in the Just Look Them Straight in the Eye and Say... Pogue Mahone!! box set.)	Traditional	If I Should Fall from Grace with God	1988	
"Metropolis"	Jem Finer	If I Should Fall from Grace with God	1988	
"Miss Otis Regrets/Just One of Those Things" † (with Kirsty MacColl)	Cole Porter	Red Hot + Blue	1990	
"The Mistlethrush"	Andrew Ranken; Philip Chevron	Just Look Them Straight in the Eye and Say... Pogue Mahone!!	2008	
"Misty Morning, Albert Bridge" †	Jem Finer	Peace and Love	1989	
"Modern World"	Darryl Hunt	Waiting for Herb	1993	
"Mountain Dew" (with the Dubliners)	Traditional	25 Years Celebration	1987	
"Moving to Moldova"	James Fearnley; Terry Woods	Just Look Them Straight in the Eye and Say... Pogue Mahone!!	2008	
"Murder"	Andrew Ranken	Just Look Them Straight in the Eye and Say... Pogue Mahone!!	2008	
"Muirshin Durkin"	Traditional	None (Note: "Muirshin Durkin" and "Whiskey You're the Devil" were released as B-sides of the "A Pair of Brown Eyes" single in 1985. They were added to the 2004 re-issue of the Red Roses for Me album.)	1985	
"My Baby's Gone"	Jem Finer; Andrew Ranken	Waiting for Herb	1993	
"Navigator"	Philip Gaston	Rum Sodomy & the Lash	1985	
"A Needle for Paddy Garcia"	Jem Finer	Just Look Them Straight in the Eye and Say... Pogue Mahone!!	2008	
"Nicaragua Libré"	Traditional	Just Look Them Straight in the Eye and Say... Pogue Mahone!!	2008	
"Night on Bald Mountain"	Modest Mussorgsky	Straight to Hell (soundtrack album)	1987	
"Night Train to Lorca"	Jem Finer	Peace and Love	1989	
"North Sea Holes"	Ewan MacColl	Just Look Them Straight in the Eye and Say... Pogue Mahone!!	2008	
"NW3"	Shane MacGowan	Just Look Them Straight in the Eye and Say... Pogue Mahone!!	2008	
"Obsession"	Jem Finer	Straight to Hell (soundtrack album)	1987	
"The Old Main Drag"	Shane MacGowan	Rum Sodomy & the Lash	1985	
"Once Upon a Time" †	Jem Finer	Waiting for Herb	1993	
"The One and Only" (with Kirsty MacColl)	Kirsty MacColl; Mark E. Nevin	Electric Landlady	1991	
"Oretown"	Jem Finer	Pogue Mahone	1996	
"Pachinko"	Jem Finer	Waiting for Herb	1993	
"A Pair of Brown Eyes" †	Shane MacGowan	Rum Sodomy & the Lash	1985	
"Paris"	Jem Finer	Just Look Them Straight in the Eye and Say... Pogue Mahone!!	2008	
""Paris St. Germain"	Spider Stacy; Terry Woods	None (Note: "Train Kept Rolling On" and "Paris St. Germain" were released as the B-sides of the "Once Upon a Time" single in 1993. They were added to the 2004 re-issue of the Waiting for Herb album.)	1993	
"The Parting Glass" (Note: A version of "The Parting Glass" as a medley with another traditional tune, "Lord Santry's Fairest Daughter", was released in the Just Look Them Straight in the Eye and Say... Pogue Mahone!! box set.)	Traditional	None (Note: "The Parting Glass" and "A Pistol for Paddy Garcia" were released as B-sides of the "Dirty Old Town" single in 1985. They were added to the 2004 re-issue of the Rum Sodomy & the Lash album.)	1985	
"Pinned Down/I'm Alone in the Wilderness"	Shane MacGowan	Just Look Them Straight in the Eye and Say... Pogue Mahone!!	2008	
"A Pistol for Paddy Garcia"	Jem Finer	None	1985	
"Planxty Noel Hill"	Jem Finer	Poguetry in Motion (EP)	1986	
"Pont Mirabeau"	Jem Finer	Pogue Mahone	1996	
"Poor Paddy"	Traditional	Red Roses for Me	1984	
"Quiet Day in Blanco Town"	Jem Finer	Straight to Hell (soundtrack album)	1987	
"Rabinga"	Philip Chevron	Straight to Hell (soundtrack album)	1987	
"Rain Street"	Shane MacGowan	Hell's Ditch	1990	
"Rainbow Man"	Terry Woods	Hell's Ditch	1990	
"Rainy Night in Soho" †	Shane MacGowan	Poguetry in Motion (EP)	1986	
"Rake at the Gates of Hell"	Shane MacGowan	Straight to Hell (soundtrack album)	1987	
"Repeal of the Licensing Laws"	Spider Stacy	None (Note: "Repeal of the Licensing Laws" was released as the B-side of the "Boys from the County Hell" single in 1984. It was added to the 2004 re-issue of the Red Roses for Me album.)	1984	
"Rince del Emplacada"	Shane MacGowan	Just Look Them Straight in the Eye and Say... Pogue Mahone!!	2008	
"Sally MacLennane" †	Shane MacGowan	Rum Sodomy & the Lash	1985	
"Sayonara"	Shane MacGowan	Hell's Ditch	1990	
"Sea Shanty"	Shane MacGowan	Red Roses for Me	1984	
"Shanne Bradley"	Shane MacGowan	None (Note: "Shanne Bradley" was released as the B-side of the "Fairytale of New York" single in 1987. It was added to the 2004 re-issue of the If I Should Fall from Grace with God album.)	1987	
"The Sick Bed of Cúchulainn"	Shane MacGowan	Rum Sodomy & the Lash	1985	
"Sit Down by the Fire"	Shane MacGowan	If I Should Fall from Grace with God	1988	
"Sitting on Top of the World"	James Fearnley; Jem Finer; Terry Woods	Waiting for Herb	1993	
"Six to Go"	Terry Woods	Hell's Ditch	1990	
"Sketches of Spain"	Jem Finer	None (Note: "Sketches of Spain" was released as the B-side of the "Fiesta" single in 1988. It was added to the 2004 re-issue of the If I Should Fall from Grace with God album.)	1988	
"Small Hours"	Jem Finer	Waiting for Herb	1993	
"Smell of Petroleum"	Jem Finer	Waiting for Herb	1993	
"Something Wild"	Shane MacGowan	Just Look Them Straight in the Eye and Say... Pogue Mahone!!	2008	
"Sound of the City Night"	Jem Finer	Just Look Them Straight in the Eye and Say... Pogue Mahone!!	2008	
"South Australia"	Traditional	If I Should Fall from Grace with God	1988	
"Squid Out of Water"	Shane MacGowan	None (Note: "Squid Out of Water" was released as the B-sides of the "Rainy Night in Soho" single in 1991. It was added to the 2004 re-issue of the Hell's Ditch album.)	1991	
"Star of the County Down"	Traditional	None	1989	
"Streams of Whiskey"	Shane MacGowan	Red Roses for Me	1984	
"Streets of Sorrow/Birmingham Six"	Shane MacGowan; Terry Woods	If I Should Fall from Grace with God	1988	
"Summer in Siam" †	Shane MacGowan	Hell's Ditch	1990	
"The Sun and the Moon"	Jamie Clarke; Spider Stacy	Pogue Mahone	1996	
"Sunny Side of the Street"	Jem Finer; Shane MacGowan	Hell's Ditch	1990	
"Taranta del Fuente"	James Fearnley; Jem Finer	Straight to Hell (soundtrack album)	1987	
"Thousands Are Sailing"	Philip Chevron	If I Should Fall from Grace with God	1988	
"Tombstone"	Jem Finer	Peace and Love	1989	
"Tosspint"	Jem Finer	Pogue Mahone	1996	
"The Town That Never Sleeps"	Jem Finer	Just Look Them Straight in the Eye and Say... Pogue Mahone!!	2008	
"Train Kept Rolling On"	Andrew Ranken	None	1993	
"Transmetropolitan"	Shane MacGowan	Red Roses for Me	1984	
"The Travelling People"	Ewan MacColl	Just Look Them Straight in the Eye and Say... Pogue Mahone!!	2008	
"Tuesday Morning" †	Spider Stacy	Waiting for Herb	1993	
"Turkish Song of the Damned"	Jem Finer; Shane MacGowan	If I Should Fall from Grace with God	1988	
"USA"	Shane MacGowan	Peace and Love	1989	
"Victoria"	Shane MacGowan	Just Look Them Straight in the Eye and Say... Pogue Mahone!!	2008	
"The Wake of the Medusa"	Jem Finer	Hell's Ditch	1990	
"Waxie's Dargle"	Traditional	Red Roses for Me	1984	
"When the Ship Comes In"	Bob Dylan	Pogue Mahone	1996	
"Where the Love's Been Gone"	Andrew Ranken; Steven Skull	Pogue Mahone	1996	
"Whiskey in the Jar" † (with the Dubliners)	Traditional	None	1990	
"Whiskey You're the Devil"	Traditional	None	1985	
"White City" †	Shane MacGowan	Peace and Love	1989	
"Who Said Romance is Dead?"	Jem Finer	Just Look Them Straight in the Eye and Say... Pogue Mahone!!	2008	
"Wild Cats of Kilkenny"	Jem Finer; Shane MacGowan	Rum Sodomy & the Lash	1985	
"The Wild Rover"	Traditional	None	1985	
"Worms"	Traditional	If I Should Fall from Grace with God	1988	
"Yeah Yeah Yeah Yeah Yeah" †	Shane MacGowan	None (Note: "Yeah Yeah Yeah Yeah Yeah" was released as a non-album single in 1988. It was added to the 2004 re-issue of the Peace and Love album.)	1988	
"Young Ned Of The Hill"	Terry Woods; Ron Kavana	Peace and Love	1989	
