= The Pogues discography =

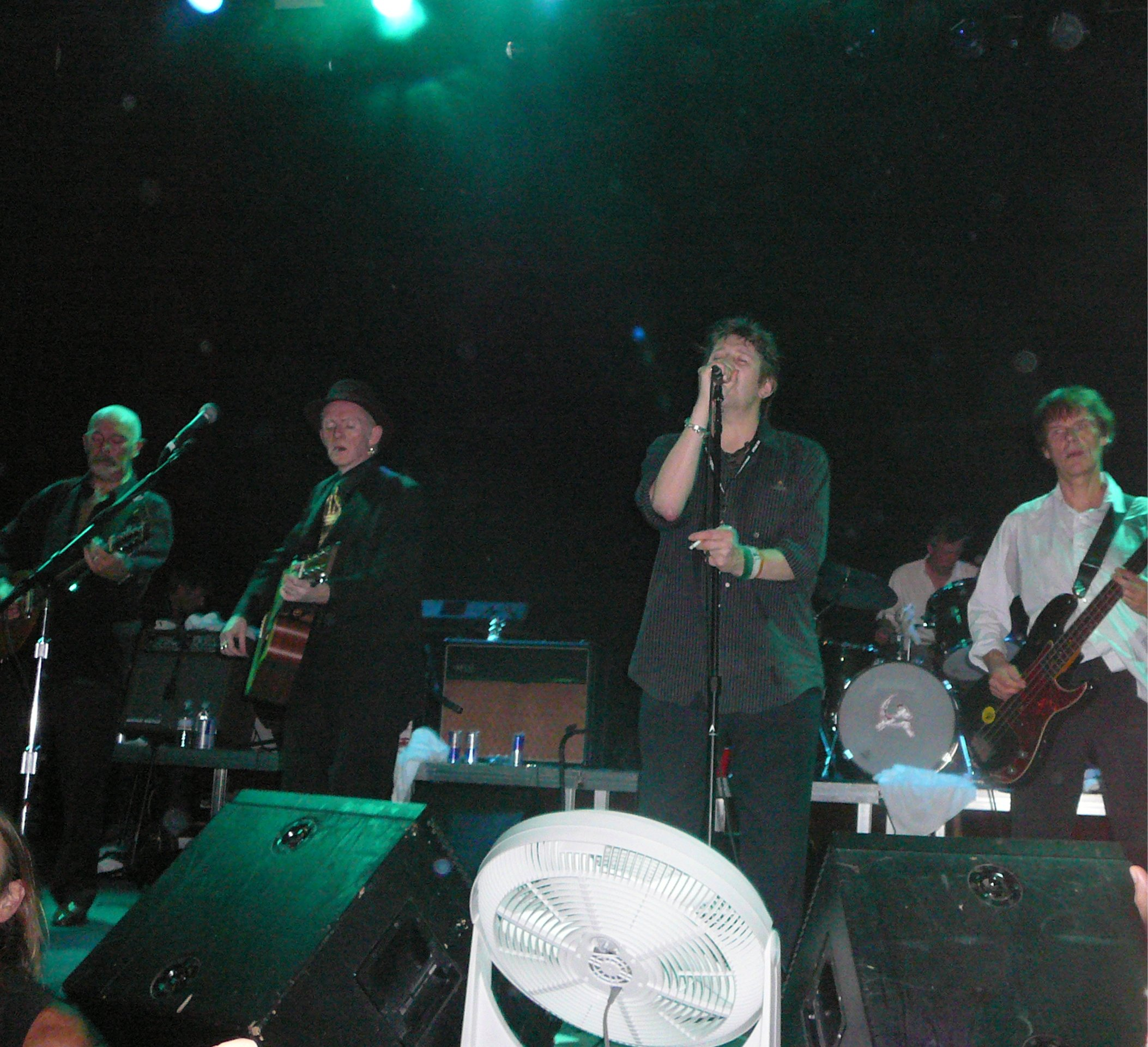

The Pogues are an English or Anglo-Irish Celtic punk band fronted by Shane MacGowan and others, founded in King's Cross, London in 1982, as Pogue Mahone – the anglicisation of the Irish Gaelic póg mo thóin, meaning 'kiss my arse'.

The band reached international prominence in the 1980s and early 1990s, recording several hit albums and singles. MacGowan left the band in 1991 owing to drinking problems, but the band continued – first with Joe Strummer and then with Spider Stacy on vocals – before breaking up in 1996. The Pogues re-formed in late 2001, and played regularly across the UK and Ireland and on the US East Coast, until dissolving again in 2014. The group did not record any new material during this second incarnation. Following MacGowan's death in 2023, Stacy along with other surviving members Jem Finer and James Fearnley reformed the band and announced a tour of the UK and Ireland for 2025.

Their politically-tinged music is informed by MacGowan and Stacy's punk backgrounds, yet used traditional Irish instruments such as the tin whistle, banjo, cittern, mandolin and accordion.

During the 1980s the Irish charts were based on sales to retailers from distributors, then in 1992 was changed to sales from retailers to the general public.

== Albums ==
=== Studio albums ===
Title	Details	Peak chart positions										Certifications (sales thresholds)
Title	Details	AUS	AUT	GER	NL	NOR	NZ	SWE	SWI	UK	US	Certifications (sales thresholds)
Red Roses for Me	Released: October 1984; Label: Warner Music Group; Formats: CD, Cassette, LP	—	—	—	—	—	—	—	—	89	—	BPI: Silver
Rum Sodomy & the Lash	Released: August 1985; Label: Warner Music Group; Formats: CD, Cassette, LP	89	—	—	—	—	17	39	—	13	—	BPI: Gold
If I Should Fall from Grace with God	Released: January 1988; Label: Warner Music Group; Formats: CD, Cassette, LP	36	—	—	52	15	4	9	9	3	88	BPI: Gold; MC: Gold
Peace and Love	Released: July 1989; Label: Warner Music Group; Formats: CD, Cassette, LP	61	—	13	53	13	32	7	17	5	118	BPI: Gold
Hell's Ditch	Released: 6 November 1990; Label: Warner Music Group; Formats: CD, Cassette, LP	82	—	—	—	—	41	17	33	12	187	BPI: Silver
Waiting for Herb	Released: September 1993; Label: Warner Music Group; Formats: CD, Cassette, LP	172	30	32	—	—	—	15	29	20	—	
Pogue Mahone	Released: 27 February 1996; Label: Warner Music Group; Formats: CD, Cassette, LP	—	38	—	—	—	—	—	—	118	—	
"—" denotes an album that did not chart or was not released.

=== Live albums ===
Title	Details	Peak chart positions
Title	Details	UK
Streams of Whiskey: Live in Leysin, Switzerland 1991	Released: 2002; Formats: CD, LP, digital download	—
The Ultimate Collection Including Live at the Brixton Academy 2001	Released: 2005; Formats: CD, LP, digital download	15
The Pogues in Paris: 30th Anniversary Concert at the Olympia	Released: 2012; Formats: CD, LP, digital download	—
Live in London The Pogues with Joe Strummer	Released: 2013; Formats: CD. LP, digital download; released on CD as part of 2013 30 Years collection, released on LP as a 2014 Record Store Day exclusive release	—
BBC Sessions 1984–1986	Released: 2020; Formats: LP – Record Store Day exclusive, limited to 5000 copies; CD, digital download, streaming	—
"—" denotes an album that did not chart or was not released.

=== Compilation albums ===
Title	Details	Peak chart positions							Certifications (sales thresholds)
Title	Details	IRE	AUS	NOR	NZ	SWE	SWI	UK	Certifications (sales thresholds)
The Best of The Pogues	Released: September 1991; Label: Warner Music Group; Formats: CD, cassette, LP	21	94	—	10	34	25	11	ARIA: Gold; BPI: Gold
Essential Pogues	Released: 19 November 1991; Label: Island; Formats: CD, cassette, LP	—	—	—	—	—	—	—	
The Rest of The Best	Released: 15 June 1992; Label: Warner Music Group; Formats: CD, cassette, LP	—	182	—	—	—	—	—	
The Very Best of The Pogues	Released: 2001; Label: Warner Music Group; Formats: CD, cassette, LP	2	167	40	12	—	87	18	BPI: Platinum; ARIA: Gold
The Ultimate Collection	Released: 2005; Label: Warner Music Group; Formats: CD, LP, digital download	12	—	13	8	41	—	15	BPI: Gold
Dirty Old Town: The Platinum Collection	Released: 2005; Label: Warner Music Group; Formats: CD, LP	46	—	—	—	—	—	—	BPI: Silver
Just Look Them Straight in the Eye and Say... POGUE MAHONE (The Pogues Box Set)	Released: 2008; Label: Warner Music Group; Formats: CD, LP, digital download	40	—	—	—	—	—	—	
The Pogues: Original Album Series	Released: 2010; Label: Warner Music Group; Formats: CD box set	—	121	—	—	—	—	—	
The Very Best of The Pogues	Released: 2013; Label: Warner Music Group; Formats: CD, LP, digital download	—	—	—	—	—	—	—	
30:30: The Essential Collection	Released: 2013; Label: Warner Music Group; Formats: CD, LP, digital download	91	194	—	—	—	—	—	
30 Years The Pogues	Released: 2013; Label: Warner Music Group; Formats: CD, LP, digital download	—	—	—	—	—	—	—	
The Stiff Records B-Sides (1984–1987)	Released: April 22, 2023; Label: Warner Music Group; Formats: LP; Note: Record Store Day comp released only through independent record stores	—	—	—	—	—	—	—	
"—" denotes an album that did not chart or was not released.

== Tributes ==
Title	Details
Tribute to the Pogues	Released: 17 March 2016; Label: Independent Russian Release; Formats: Digital download, CD

== Videos ==
Title	Details	Notes
Live at The Town & Country Club London 1988	Released: VHS, 1988; DVD, 2003; Formats: VHS, DVD	
Saturday Night Live	Released: 1990; Formats: VHS, DVD	Season 15, Episode 16 – "Rob Lowe/The Pogues"
Poguevision	Released: VHS, 1991; DVD, 2002; Formats: VHS, DVD	Music video collection
Completely Pogued	Released: VHS 1991; DVD, 2003; Formats: VHS, DVD	Documentary; As extra on Live at the Town & Country
The Pogues in Paris – 30th Anniversary	Released: November 2012; Formats: DVD	Length: 1h40:17; Video recording taken from two shows performed on 11 & 12 September 2012 at L'Olympia in Paris, France

== Singles ==
Year	Title	Peak chart positions										Certifications	Album
Year	Title	IRE	AUS	NL	NOR	NZ	SWE	SWI	UK	US Club	US Rock	Certifications	Album
1984	"Dark Streets of London"	—	—	—	—	—	—	—	—	—	—		Red Roses for Me
1984	"Boys from the County Hell"	—	—	—	—	—	—	—	—	—	—		Red Roses for Me
1985	"A Pair of Brown Eyes"	—	—	—	—	—	—	—	72	—	—		Rum Sodomy & the Lash
1985	"Sally MacLennane"	—	—	—	—	—	—	—	51	—	—		Rum Sodomy & the Lash
1985	"Dirty Old Town"	27	—	—	—	—	—	—	62	—	—	BPI: Gold; RMNZ: Platinum	Rum Sodomy & the Lash
1986	Poguetry in Motion (EP)	11	—	—	—	9	—	—	29	—	—		
1986	"Haunted"	7	—	—	—	—	—	—	42	—	—		Sid and Nancy Soundtrack
1987	"The Irish Rover" (featuring The Dubliners)	1	—	—	—	25	—	—	8	—	—		25 Years Celebration
1987	"Fairytale of New York" (featuring Kirsty MacColl)	1	33	52	8	5	14	40	2	—	—	RMNZ: 3× Platinum	If I Should Fall from Grace with God
1988	"If I Should Fall from Grace with God"	4	—	—	—	27	—	—	58	—	—		If I Should Fall from Grace with God
1988	"Fiesta"	11	—	23	—	—	—	—	24	—	—		If I Should Fall from Grace with God
1988	"Yeah Yeah Yeah Yeah Yeah"	6	111	—	—	19	—	—	43	36	17		Yeah Yeah Yeah Yeah Yeah
1989	"Misty Morning, Albert Bridge"	8	159	—	—	—	—	—	41	—	—		Peace and Love
1989	"White City"	22	—	—	—	—	—	—	90	—	—		Peace and Love
1990	"Summer in Siam"	21	139	—	—	—	—	—	64	—	—		Hell's Ditch
1990	"Jack's Heroes" (featuring The Dubliners)	4	—	—	—	—	—	—	63	—	—		Yeah Yeah Yeah Yeah Yeah
1990	"Miss Otis Regrets / Just One of Those Things" (with Kirsty MacColl)	—	—	—	—	—	—	—	—	—	—		Red Hot + Blue
1991	"Sunny Side of the Street"	—	—	—	—	—	—	—	—	—	23		Hell's Ditch
1991	"A Rainy Night in Soho" (remix)	24	—	—	—	—	—	—	67	—	—		Poguetry in Motion
1991	"Fairytale of New York" (re-issue)	10	—	—	—	—	—	—	36	—	—		If I Should Fall from Grace with God
1992	"Honky Tonk Women"	—	166	—	—	—	—	—	56	—	—		Yeah Yeah Yeah Yeah Yeah
1993	"Tuesday Morning"	26	166	—	—	—	—	—	18	—	11		Waiting for Herb
1993	"Once Upon a Time"	—	—	—	—	—	—	—	66	—	—		Waiting for Herb
2005	"Fairytale of New York" (re-release)	3	—	—	—	—	—	—	3	—	—	BPI: 7× Platinum	If I Should Fall from Grace with God
