= The Very Best of The Pogues =

The Very Best of the Pogues

Greatest hits album by The Pogues
- Released: 11 April 2001
- Genre: Celtic punk; folk punk; Celtic rock; folk rock
- Label: Warner Music Group
- Producer: Various

The Pogues chronology
Pogue Mahone (1996)	The Very Best of the Pogues (2001)	Streams of Whiskey: Live in Leysin, Switzerland 1991 (2002)

The Very Best of the Pogues is a greatest hits album by The Pogues, released in April 2001.

== Track listing ==
No.	Title	Writer(s)	Original album	Length
1.	"Dirty Old Town"	Ewan MacColl	Rum Sodomy & the Lash (1985)	3:45
2.	"The Irish Rover" (featuring The Dubliners)	Traditional	25 Years Celebration by The Dubliners (1987)	4:08
3.	"Sally MacLennane"	Shane MacGowan	Rum Sodomy & the Lash (1985)	2:45
4.	"Fiesta"	MacGowan, Jem Finer, Edmund Kötscher, Rudi Lindt	If I Should Fall from Grace with God (1988)	4:12
5.	"A Pair of Brown Eyes"	MacGowan	Rum Sodomy & the Lash (1985)	5:01
6.	"Fairytale of New York" (featuring Kirsty MacColl)	MacGowan, Finer	If I Should Fall from Grace with God (1988)	4:32
7.	"The Body of an American"	MacGowan	Poguetry in Motion EP (1986)	4:44
8.	"Streams of Whiskey"	MacGowan	Red Roses for Me (1984)	2:33
9.	"The Sick Bed of Cuchulainn"	MacGowan	Rum Sodomy & the Lash (1985)	3:00
10.	"If I Should Fall from Grace with God"	MacGowan	If I Should Fall from Grace with God (1988)	2:21
11.	"Misty Morning, Albert Bridge"	Finer	Peace and Love (1989)	3:02
12.	"Rain Street"	MacGowan	Hell's Ditch (1990)	4:02
13.	"White City"	MacGowan	Peace and Love (1989)	2:31
14.	"A Rainy Night in Soho" (1991 mix)	MacGowan	Poguetry in Motion EP (1986)	4:44
15.	"London Girl"	MacGowan	Poguetry in Motion EP (1986)	3:05
16.	"Boys From The County Hell"	MacGowan	Red Roses for Me (1984)	2:56
17.	"Sunny Side of the Street"	MacGowan, Finer	Hell's Ditch (1990)	2:44
18.	"Summer in Siam"	MacGowan	Hell's Ditch (1990)	4:08
19.	"Hell's Ditch"	MacGowan, Finer	Hell's Ditch (1990)	3:04
20.	"The Old Main Drag"	MacGowan	Rum Sodomy & the Lash (1985)	3:19
21.	"The Band Played Waltzing Matilda"	Eric Bogle	Rum Sodomy & the Lash (1985)	4:52

Track lengths per Apple Music

== Charts ==
Weekly chart performance for The Very Best of The Pogues
Chart (2003–2023)	Peak position
Australian Albums (ARIA)	167
Irish Albums (OCC)	2
Swiss Albums (Schweizer Hitparade)	87

== Certifications ==
Region	Certification	Certified units/sales
Australia (ARIA)	Gold	35,000^{^}
United Kingdom (BPI)	Platinum	300,000^{*}
^{*} Sales figures based on certification alone.^{^} Shipments figures based on certification alone.
