= Haunted (The Pogues song) =

Single by The Pogues

from the album Sid and Nancy (OST)
- Released: August 1986
- Recorded: 1986
- Genre: Rock
- Songwriter: Shane MacGowan

The Pogues singles chronology
"Dirty Old Town" (1985)	"Haunted" (1986)	"The Irish Rover" (1987)

"Haunted" is a song by the Pogues, released as a single in 1986. It was featured on the Sid and Nancy Soundtrack, the original soundtrack for the film Sid and Nancy. It reached No. 42 in the UK. Originally sung by Cait O'Riordan, in 1995 the song was re-recorded as a duet between former Pogues vocalist Shane MacGowan and Sinéad O'Connor for the Two If by Sea/Stolen Hearts soundtrack, this time reaching No. 30 in the UK. The original version was included on disc 1 of the 2008 compilation Just Look Them in the Eye and Say... Pogue Mahone!!

== Legacy ==
In April 2025, "Haunted" was issued on vinyl single, for the first time, as part of that year's Record Store Day. The single debuted at number 18 on the UK Vinyl Singles Chart.

== Personnel ==
- Spider Stacy – vocals, tin whistle
- Jem Finer – banjo, mandola, saxophone, hurdy-gurdy, guitar, vocals
- James Fearnley – accordion, mandolin, piano, guitar
- Shane MacGowan – vocals, guitar, banjo, bodhrán
- Andrew Ranken – drums, percussion, harmonica, vocals
- Darryl Hunt – bass guitar
- Terry Woods – mandolin, cittern, concertina, guitar, vocals
- Cait O'Riordan – bass, vocals
- Philip Chevron – guitar, vocals

== Chart performance ==
=== The Pogues version ===
Chart (1986)	Peak position
UK Singles (Official Charts)	42

=== Shane MacGowan & Sinead O'Connor version ===
Chart (1995)	Peak position
UK Singles (Official Charts)	30

Chart (2025)	Peak position
UK Vinyl Singles	18
