= Sunny Side of the Street (song) =

"The Sunny Side of the Street"

Single by The Pogues

from the album Hell's Ditch
- Released: 1990
- Genre: Celtic punk
- Length: 2:44
- Songwriters: Shane MacGowan, Jem Finer

The Pogues singles chronology
"Jack's Heroes" (1990)	"The Sunny Side of the Street" (1990)	"Rainy Night in Soho" (1991)

"The Sunny Side of the Street" is a track from the Pogues' fifth album, Hell's Ditch, released in 1990. The song, composed by Shane MacGowan and Jem Finer, is an up-tempo celebration of an unrepentant libertine—a common theme for frontman and lyricist MacGowan.

Joe Strummer, the track's and album's producer later listed it as one of his personal favorite songs ever.

== Charts ==
Chart performance for "Sunny Side of the Street"
Chart (1991)	Peak position
US Alternative Airplay (Billboard)	23
