= How Come (Ronnie Lane song) =

Single by Ronnie Lane
- A-side: "How Come"
- B-side: "Tell Everyone", "Done This One Before" (latter track not in Continental Europe)
- Released: 1974
- Recorded: 1973
- Genre: Folk rock, Celtic rock
- Label: GM (UK), Philips (Eire and Continental Europe), A&M (North America)
- Songwriters: Ronnie Lane/Kevin Westlake (A-side); Ronnie Lane (B-side)
- Producer: Glyn Johns

"How Come" is a song co-written by Ronnie Lane and Kevin Westlake, and recorded by Lane as his first single in 1973 after he left Faces. Featuring a band of constantly changing personnel called Slim Chance, including Benny Gallagher and Graham Lyle, who later had considerable success as a performing and songwriting duo in their own right, it reached No. 11 in the UK.

Gallagher played piano accordion and Lyle mandolin on the A-side, both also contributing back-up vocals. "Done This One Before", on the B-side, featured Gallagher on Hammond organ and Lyle on harmonica.

"How Come" was rereleased in January 1977 in the UK with "The Poacher" and "Tell Everyone" on the B-side. The first 10,000 copies had an exclusive picture sleeve.

The song was later recorded by Oscar Houchins, of the White Whale Recording group the Clique, and released by Monument Records in 1975.

In 1995, "How Come" was released as a single by the Pogues, peaking at number 88 in the UK. In 1996 the song was used as the first track of the Pogues' seventh and last studio album Pogue Mahone.
