= Summer in Siam =

Single by The Pogues

from the album Hell's Ditch
- Released: 1990
- Genre: Folk rock; lounge-jazz
- Length: 4:06
- Songwriter: Shane MacGowan
- Producer: Joe Strummer

The Pogues singles chronology
"Misty Morning, Albert Bridge" (1989)	"Summer in Siam" (1990)	"Jack's Heroes" (1990)

"Summer in Siam" is a single by The Pogues from their 1990 album, Hell's Ditch. Composed by frontman Shane MacGowan, it charted in the UK Top 100 at Number 64. The accompanying music video was directed by Don Letts and produced by Nick Verden for Radar Films. The album was produced by Joe Strummer.

"Summer in Siam" was originally played by MacGowan to the rest of the band on a Casio synthesiser. While the final arrangement was greatly modified from the original demo, it reflected MacGowan's growing interest in acid-house music. MacGowan stated in 2022 that along with "Lorca's Novena" and "Hot Dogs With Everything", "Summer in Siam" is one of his favourite songs by The Pogues.

In 2023, Stephen Dalton of The Times listed "Summer in Siam" among the Pogues' six best songs, commenting that, written on a "tiny Casio keyboard", the song grew out of MacGowan's interest in acid house. He deemed it to be a "woozy, lysergic, euphoric lounge-jazz reverie" and added: "Initially the band hated it, but it became one of their most unusual hit singles."
