= Hell's Ditch =

Studio album by The Pogues
- Released: 1 October 1990
- Studios: Rockfield (Rockfield, Wales)
- Genres: Celtic rock; folk rock
- Length: 41:24
- Label: Island
- Producer: Joe Strummer

The Pogues chronology
Peace and Love (1989)	Hell's Ditch (1990)	The Best of The Pogues (1991)

Singles from Hell's Ditch
- 1. "Summer in Siam" Released: September 1990; 2. "Sayonara" Released: February 1991

Professional ratings
Review scores
Source	Rating
Allmusic	3/5 stars

Hell's Ditch is the fifth studio album by the Pogues, released on 1 October 1990, and the last to feature frontman Shane MacGowan as a member.

== Overview ==
Hell's Ditch continued the group's slow departure from Irish music, giving more emphasis to rock and straight folk rock, and forsaking their earlier staples of traditional compositions almost entirely. MacGowan parted with the band after the release of the album, owing to the decline of his reliability as a performer, which was caused by his abuse of alcohol and drugs.

Several of the songs on the album have Asian themes, in sound or in content, including "Summer in Siam", "The House of Gods" and "Sayonara". The song "Lorca's Novena" draws on MacGowan's affinity for Spain (particularly Almería, which he had discovered years earlier when filming Straight to Hell), and the Spanish poet Federico García Lorca. It tells of the poet's murder by Francisco Franco's Nationalist supporters in the Spanish Civil War, and how his body, never having been recovered, was said to have walked away. "The Wake of the Medusa" is a first-person narrative inspired by Théodore Géricault's painting "The Raft of the Medusa", which had appeared on the cover of the band's second album, Rum, Sodomy, and the Lash. The title track is based largely on the life and writings of French author and playwright Jean Genet, in particular The Miracle of the Rose and Our Lady of the Flowers, with its description of squalid prison life.

The album was produced by the Clash's Joe Strummer, who later served as a temporary replacement for MacGowan when the band went on tour. The cover art for the album was designed by Joshua Cheuse, who also designed the cover for the Clash on Broadway box set as well as album covers for Strummer and Big Audio Dynamite.

== Track listing ==
=== Standard edition ===
1. "Sunny Side of the Street" (Shane MacGowan, Jem Finer) – 2:44
2. "Sayonara" (MacGowan) – 3:07
3. "The Ghost of a Smile" (MacGowan) – 2:58
4. "Hell's Ditch" (MacGowan, Finer) – 3:03
5. "Lorca's Novena" (MacGowan) – 4:40
6. "Summer in Siam" (MacGowan) – 4:06
7. "Rain Street" (MacGowan) – 4:00
8. "Rainbow Man" (Terry Woods) – 2:46
9. "The Wake of the Medusa" (Finer) – 3:04
10. "House of the Gods" (MacGowan) – 3:46
11. "5 Green Queens & Jean" (MacGowan, Finer) – 2:35
12. "Maidrin Rua" (Traditional) – 1:47
13. "Six to Go" (Woods) – 2:58

=== Bonus tracks (2005 reissue) ===
14. "Whiskey in the Jar" (Traditional) (B-side to "Jack's Heroes") – 2:41 (with the Dubliners)
15. "Bastard Landlord" (Finer) (B-side to "Summer in Siam") – 3:09
16. "Infinity" (MacGowan) (B-side to "Sayonara" 12") – 2:48
17. "The Curse of Love" (Finer) (B-side to "Sayonara") – 2:43
18. "Squid Out of Water" (MacGowan) (B-side to "A Rainy Night in Soho") – 3:47
19. "Jack's Heroes" (Woods, Spider Stacy) (A-side single) – 3:06 (with the Dubliners)
20. "A Rainy Night in Soho" (1991 version) (MacGowan) (A-side single) – 4:48

== Personnel ==
Credits are adapted from the album liner notes, except where noted.

The Pogues

- Shane MacGowan – vocals
- Jem Finer – banjo, mandola, hurdy-gurdy, saxophone, acoustic guitar, lap steel guitar, shaker
- Spider Stacy – tin whistle, harmonica, lead vocals on "The Wake of the Medusa"
- James Fearnley – accordion, piano, banjo, acoustic guitar, electric guitar, violin, electric sitar, kalimba
- Terry Woods – mandolin, cittern, concertina, acoustic guitar, electric guitar, accordion, auto harp, lead vocals on "Rainbow Man", "Maidrin Rua" and "Six to Go"
- Philip Chevron – acoustic guitar, electric guitar, accordion, backing vocals
- Darryl Hunt – bass guitar, bells, congas, backing vocals
- Andrew Ranken – drums, tambourine, backing vocals

Additional musicians

- The Pogues – percussion on "Hell's Ditch", "Maidrin Rua" and "Six to Go"
- Siobhan Sheahan – harp on "Summer in Siam"
- Fiachra Trench – string arrangement on "A Rainy Night in Soho"
- Spider Stacy, Terry Woods, Darryl Hunt, Andrew Ranken, John Sheahan, Eamonn Campbell, Paul Verner, Jim Hand, Frank Murray – chorus on "Jack's Heroes"

Technical

- Joe Strummer – producer
- Paul Cobbold – engineer
- Joshua Cheuse – cover art
- Dave Jordan – producer on "Jack's Heroes" and "Whiskey in the Jar"
- Terry Woods – producer on "Jack's Heroes" and "Whiskey in the Jar"
- Steve Lillywhite – producer, mixing on "A Rainy Night in Soho"
- Chris Dickie – engineer on "Jack's Heroes", "Whiskey in the Jar" and "A Rainy Night in Soho"
- Eamonn Campbell – mixing on "Whiskey in the Jar"
- John Sheahan – mixing on "Whiskey in the Jar"

== Charts ==
Chart performance for Hell's Ditch
Chart (1990–1991)	Peak position
Australian Albums (ARIA)	82
New Zealand Albums (RMNZ)	41
Swedish Albums (Sverigetopplistan)	17
Swiss Albums (Schweizer Hitparade)	33
UK Albums (Official Charts)	12

== Certifications ==
Region	Certification	Certified units/sales
United Kingdom (BPI)	Silver	60,000^{^}
^{^} Shipments figures based on certification alone.

== Hell's Ditch demos ==
The Hell's Ditch demos (commonly known as the Falconer demos, after the studio in which they were tracked) were recorded prior to this album. "Murder Ska" and "Redemption Song" are both unreleased tracks featuring Spider Stacy on lead vocals. "Victoria" and "Lust for Vomit" are both instrumental versions of songs that later appeared on Shane MacGowan and the Popes' 1994 debut album The Snake, the latter retitled "A Mexican Funeral in Paris". "NW3" and "Murder Ska" were played live as early as 1988 but never properly recorded. A studio version of "NW3" was recorded for inclusion on Hell's Ditch, but MacGowan was unable to deliver a satisfactory vocal performance, leaving the track as an unfinished instrumental. Thus, "NW3" is an early version of "Mother Mo Chroi", which was released on MacGowan's second solo effort, 1997's The Crock of Gold. "NW3" or "Mother Mo Chroi" appears to be very similar in sound and structure to The Pogues' original song "Rake At The Gates of Hell" (released on the 1987 Straight To Hell soundtrack album).

The Falconer demos are widely available on the Internet, and unlicensed copies occasionally surface on the online auction site eBay. They also appear on the Pogues box set of rare and unreleased material released by Rhino Entertainment on 17 March 2008.

=== Track listing ===
1. "Murder Ska" (unreleased track)
2. "Ghost of a Smile"
3. "Bastard Landlord"
4. "Summer in Siam"
5. "Wake of the Medusa"
6. "NW3" (early instrumental version of Shane MacGowan and the Popes' 1997 "Mother Mo Chroi")
7. "Victoria" (instrumental version)
8. "Redemption Song" (unreleased track)
9. "Lust for Vomit" (early instrumental version of Shane MacGowan and the Popes' 1994 "A Mexican Funeral in Paris")
10. "Five Green Queens & Jean"
