= Misty Morning, Albert Bridge =

Single by The Pogues

from the album Peace and Love
- Released: 1989
- Genre: Celtic rock
- Length: 3:01
- Songwriter(s): Jem Finer

The Pogues singles chronology
"Yeah Yeah Yeah Yeah Yeah" (1988)	"Misty Morning, Albert Bridge" (1989)	"Summer in Siam" (1990)

"Misty Morning, Albert Bridge" is a 1989 single by the British-Irish folk rock band The Pogues. It was composed by banjo player Jem Finer and featured on the band's fourth album, Peace and Love. It was the Pogues' last single to chart in the UK Top 50 before frontman Shane MacGowan left the group in 1991, stalling just outside the top 40 at number 41. It was the only single from the album to chart. The song is about the famous Albert Bridge, London. The accompanying video was directed by Peter Dougherty and was produced by Nick Verden for Radar Films.
