= Pogue Mahone =

Studio album by The Pogues
- Released: 27 February 1996
- Recorded: 1995
- Studio: RAK Studios, London
- Genre: Celtic rock
- Length: 43:36
- Label: WEA
- Producer: Steve Brown

The Pogues chronology
Waiting for Herb (1993)	Pogue Mahone (1996)	The Very Best of The Pogues (2001)

Singles from Pogue Mahone
- 1. "How Come" Released: 1995; 2. "Love You Till the End" Released: aborted

Professional ratings
Review scores
Source	Rating
AllMusic	3/5 stars
Robert Christgau	(dud)
The Encyclopedia of Popular Music	2/5 stars
Entertainment Weekly	B+
MusicHound Rock: The Essential Album Guide	2/5 stars
The New Rolling Stone Album Guide	1.5/5 stars

Pogue Mahone is the seventh and final studio album by the Pogues, released in February 1996. The title is a variant of the Irish phrase póg mo thóin, meaning "kiss my arse", from which the band's name is derived. It was the band's second studio album recorded after the departure of Shane MacGowan, and features Spider Stacy in the role of lead singer.

== Overview ==
The album was not a critical or commercial success. After its release founding member Jem Finer left the band, and the remaining members decided to end their run together as well. The album yielded one single, "How Come". "Love You Till the End" was to be the second single, but this was never released. The song appears in the 1999 movie Mystery, Alaska and on the soundtrack to the movie P.S. I Love You.

== Critical reception ==
Trouser Press wrote that a "shortage of songs that are more than workably agreeable and a complete lack of edge in their performances leaves the harmless album sounding like the work of a skilled and spirited but bog-ordinary Irish pub band." The Los Angeles Times wrote that "some numbers sound almost new age, thanks to an airy whistle, while others sound like dull FM-rock with a dash of Irish flavor."

== Track listing ==
=== Standard edition ===
1. "How Come" (Ronnie Lane, Kevin Westlake) – 2:50
2. "Living in a World Without Her" (Darryl Hunt, James McNally) – 3:20
3. "When the Ship Comes In" (Bob Dylan) – 3:14
4. "Anniversary" (Jem Finer) – 4:06
5. "Amadie" (Andrew Ranken) – 1:53
6. "Love You 'Till the End" (Hunt) – 4:32
7. "Bright Lights" (Finer) – 2:37
8. "Oretown" (Finer) – 3:50
9. "Pont Mirabeau" (Guillaume Apollinaire, Finer; translated by Finer and Samuel Edward Finer) – 3:31
10. "Tosspint" (Finer) – 3:32
11. "Four O'Clock in the Morning" (Ranken) – 3:12
12. "Where That Love's Been Gone" (Ranken, Steven Skull) – 3:50
13. "The Sun and the Moon" (Jamie Clarke, Spider Stacy) – 3:22

=== Bonus tracks (2004 reissue) ===
14. "Eyes of an Angel" (Finer) – 2:54 (B-side to "How Come")
15. "Love You Till the End" (Hunt) – 3:54 (Stephen Hague Mix)

== Personnel ==
Credits are adapted from the album liner notes, except where noted.

The Pogues

- Spider Stacy – lead vocals
- David Coulter – mandolin (tracks 3, 6, 7, 8, 10, 12, 13), tambourine (tracks 2, 3, 7, 10, 13), baritone ukulele (tracks 4, 9), djembe (tracks 6), shaker (tracks 6, 8)
- Jem Finer – banjo (tracks 2–5, 7, 10–13), guitar (tracks 1, 4, 6, 8, 9), hurdy-gurdy (tracks 4, 10)
- Jamie Clarke – guitar (tracks 2–13), bass (track 6), backing vocals (track 13)
- James McNally – accordion (tracks 1–5, 7–10, 12, 13), whistle (tracks 1–4, 13), piano (tracks 2, 6, 9), low whistle (tracks 8, 11), Uilleann pipes (tracks 10, 11, 13)
- Darryl Hunt – bass (tracks 1–5, 7–13), backing vocals (tracks 1–3, 7, 12)
- Andrew Ranken – drums; co-lead vocals (track 5)

Additional musicians

- Stephen Warbeck – mandolin, piano and accordion on "How Come"
- Steve Brown – backing vocals on "How Come"
- Stephen Hague – backing vocals on "How Come"
- Jon Sevink – fiddle on "Living in a World Without Her" and "Anniversary"
- Debsey Wykes – backing vocals on "Anniversary" and "Love You 'Till the End"
- Anne Wood – violin on "Where That Love's Been Gone"
- Kick Horns – brass on "Eyes of an Angel"

Electra Strings

- Caroline Lavelle – cello on "Anniversary", "Love You 'Till the End" and "Pont Mirabeau"
- Jocelyn Pook – viola on "Anniversary", "Love You 'Till the End" and "Pont Mirabeau"
- Julia Singleton – violin on "Anniversary", "Love You 'Till the End" and "Pont Mirabeau"
- Sonia Slany – violin on "Anniversary", "Love You 'Till the End" and "Pont Mirabeau"

Technical

- Steve Brown – producer, engineer, mixing
- Shelley Saunders – assistant engineer
- Steve Musters – mixing assistant
- Stephen Hague – additional production and mixing on "How Come"
- Mike "Spike" Drake – mixing on "How Come"
- Ian Cooper – mastering
- Darryl Hunt – cover design, cover art
- Claudia Pöschl – cover design, cover art
- Steve Pyke – photography, portraits
