= Dark Streets of London =

Single by The Pogues

from the album Red Roses for Me
- B-side: "And the Band Played Waltzing Matilda"
- Released: 1984
- Genre: Celtic punk
- Length: 3:33
- Label: Stiff
- Songwriter(s): Shane MacGowan

The Pogues singles chronology
"Dark Streets of London" (1984)	"Boys from the County Hell" (1984)

"Dark Streets of London" is the debut single by the London-based Celtic punk band The Pogues, released in 1984. The song was written by Pogues frontman Shane MacGowan and is featured on the band's 1984 debut album Red Roses for Me. The B-side is "And the Band Played Waltzing Matilda" (which clocks in at 4:50 and is different from the version which appears on their second album).
