= A Rainy Night in Soho =

1986 song by British punk band The Pogues

Single by The Pogues

from the album Poguetry in Motion
- Released: 1986
- Genre: Celtic rock
- Songwriter: Shane MacGowan

The Pogues singles chronology
"Sunny Side of the Street" (1991)	"A Rainy Night in Soho" (1986)	"Fairytale of New York" (1992)

"A Rainy Night in Soho" is a song by The Pogues released in 1986, originally included on their Poguetry in Motion EP.

Two recordings and various mixes of the song were made in the studio. Songwriter Shane MacGowan and producer Elvis Costello clashed over the final mix of the song, with MacGowan preferring a mix featuring a cornet, and Costello preferring a version with oboe. The cornet version was used, except for Canadian editions of the EP, which used the oboe version. A third version combining elements of both mixes was issued on the 1991 Poguetry in Motion re-issue, and is also available on the remastered and expanded Hell's Ditch CD. Other mixes have surfaced on various compilations and bootlegs, and according to guitarist Philip Chevron there are "something like 13 versions... with different edits of the two recordings".

== Video ==
A video was filmed for the song. It shows Shane MacGowan with short beard, aviator sunglasses, and leather jacket singing into a 1950s styled mic; the black-and-white footage is mixed with images from the protagonist's childhood and frames from night-time London (Soho). Finally Shane dances the waltz with his girlfriend before a burning fire.

== Cover versions ==
The song has been covered by Bono, Johnny Depp, and Bob Dylan.

In March 2026, Bruce Springsteen released a cover that will be included on the November 2026 tribute album 20th Century Paddy - The Songs of Shane MacGowan.

Nick Cave recorded the song as a B-side to Cave and MacGowan's 1992 duet of "What a Wonderful World". Cave sang the song again at MacGowan's funeral in December 2023 with slightly altered lyrics.
