= Yeah Yeah Yeah Yeah Yeah =

1988 single by the Pogues

Single by The Pogues
- B-side: "The Limerick Rake"
- Released: 5 December 1988
- Length: 3:16
- Label: Pogue Mahone Records
- Songwriter: Shane MacGowan
- Producer: Steve Lillywhite

The Pogues singles chronology
"Fiesta" (1988)	"Yeah Yeah Yeah Yeah Yeah" (1988)	"Misty Morning, Albert Bridge" (1989)

Yeah Yeah Yeah Yeah Yeah

EP by The Pogues
- Released: September 1990
- Genre: Celtic rock
- Length: 13:31
- Label: Island

The Pogues chronology
Peace and Love (1989)	Yeah Yeah Yeah Yeah Yeah (1990)	Hell's Ditch (1990)

Professional ratings
Review scores
Source	Rating
Allmusic	2/5 stars

"Yeah Yeah Yeah Yeah Yeah" is a single by The Pogues. It stalled just outside the UK Top 40 at number 43, but became the band's first single to chart in the US, reaching number 17 in the Modern Rock Charts. The video was based on episodes of Ready, Steady, Go! and Top of the Pops from the 1960s, showing a differing of styles from the innocence of the early 1960s to the psychedelica of the late 1960s. An EP of the same name was released in September 1990 and contained some of The Pogues' most rock-oriented material, including a cover of "Honky Tonk Women" by The Rolling Stones.

== Track listing ==
UK 12"

1. "Yeah, Yeah, Yeah, Yeah, Yeah" – 3:16
2. "The Limerick Rake" – 3:10
3. "Honky Tonk Women" – 2:55
4. "Yeah, Yeah, Yeah, Yeah, Yeah (Long Version)" – 6:43

US CD

1. "Yeah, Yeah, Yeah, Yeah, Yeah" – 3:16
2. "Honky Tonk Women" – 2:55
3. "Jack's Heroes" – 3:05 (misspelled "Jack's Hero's" on the album cover and CD)
4. "Whiskey in the Jar (Long Version)" – 4:15
