= Spider Stacy =

British songwriter

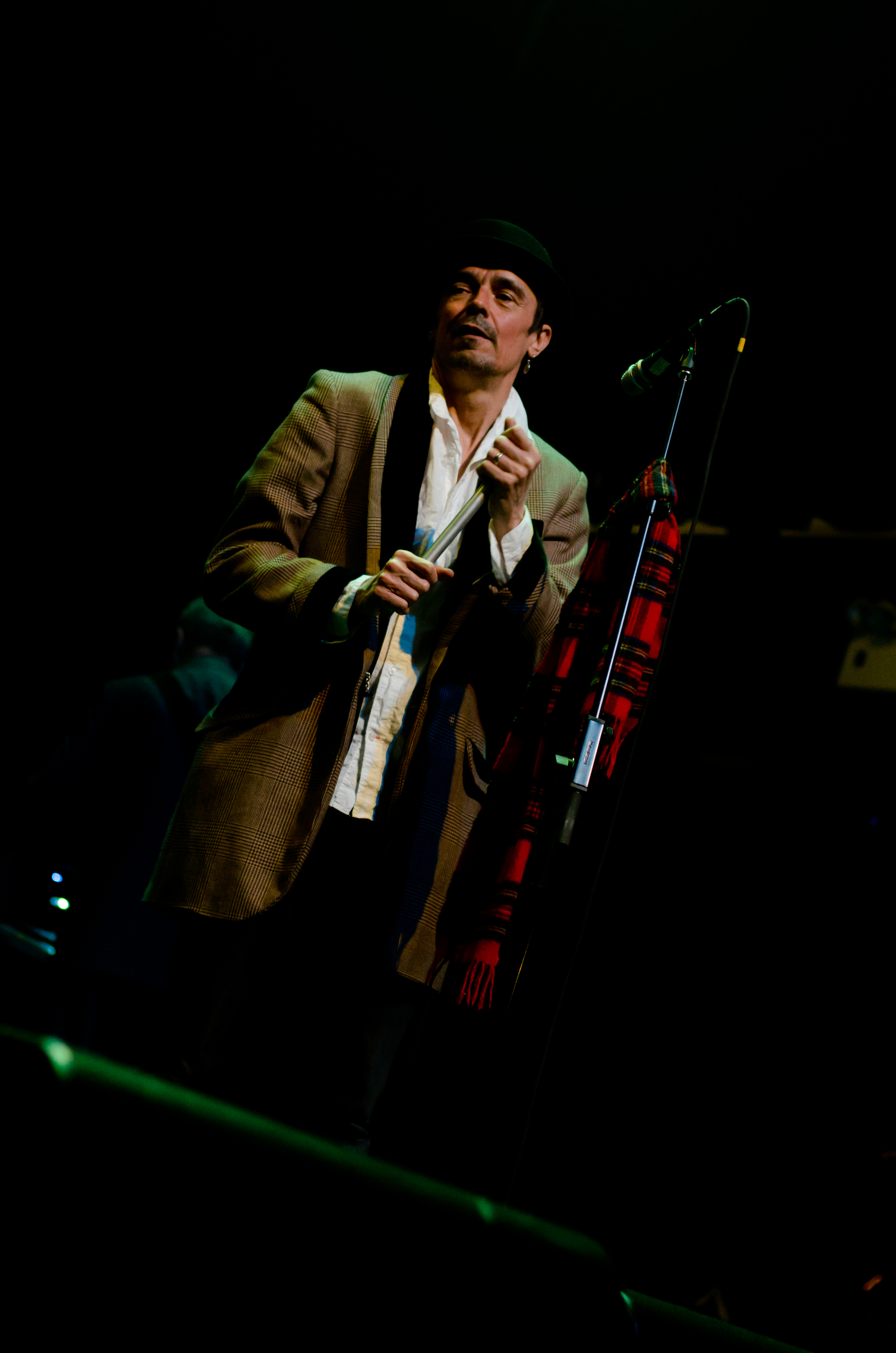
- Spider Stacy in New York in March 2011

Background information
- Born: Peter Richard Stacy; 14 December 1958 (age 67); Eastbourne, England
- Genres: Celtic punk; folk punk
- Occupations: Singer; songwriter; musician
- Instruments: Vocals; tin whistle
- Years active: 1977–present

Peter Richard "Spider" Stacy (born 14 December 1958) is an English musician, singer, songwriter, and actor. He is best known for playing tin whistle and sometimes singing for the Pogues.

== Early life ==
Stacy grew up in Eastbourne. He left school at 16 after failing to attend regularly, and had a few jobs, including working at a carwash and as a used car salesman for nearly two years.

== The Pogues ==
Stacy co-founded the Pogues, along with Shane MacGowan, Jem Finer, and James Fearnley, and appeared on all of their recordings. He is credited with suggesting the band's original name, Pogue Mahone (the actual Irish spelling being "póg mo thóin"), which is Irish for "kiss my arse". The band's original intent was for MacGowan and Stacy to share vocal duties, but Stacy decided to leave them to Shane after the first performance, opting to learn the tin whistle. Stacy still frequently contributed backing vocals and occasional lead vocals throughout his long tenure with the band. In addition, he is known for sometimes banging a pub tray against his head for percussive effect. After Shane MacGowan was fired from the Pogues in 1991, Joe Strummer filled in for him for a short period, after which Stacy assumed the role of lead vocalist. The Pogues recorded two albums with Stacy on lead vocals: Waiting for Herb and Pogue Mahone. Stacy resumed his original role in the band when they held reunion shows in 2001 and from 2024.

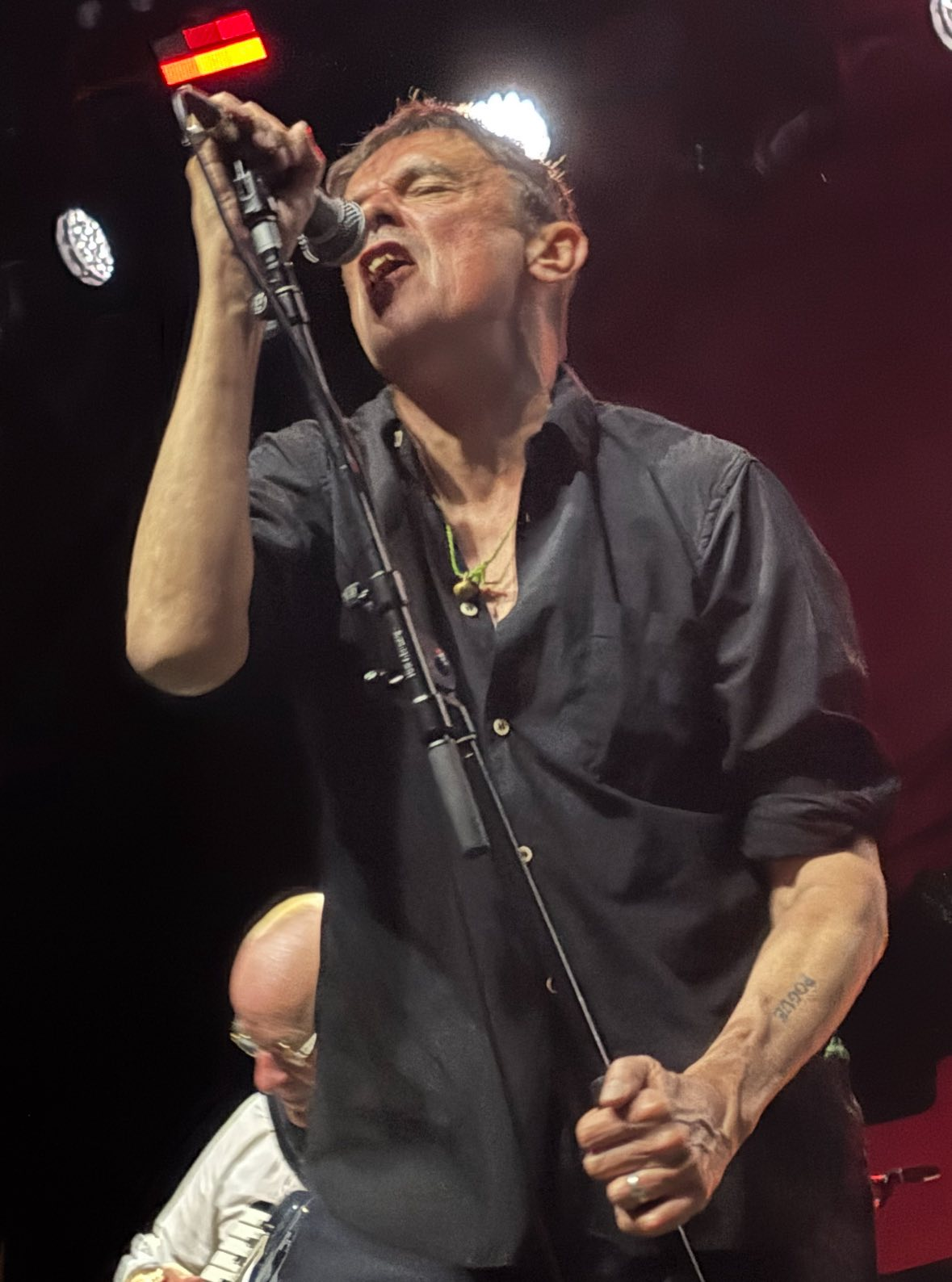
Spider Stacy performing as lead singer of The Pogues during a show at Terminal 5 in New York City on September 16, 2025.

Stacy, along with Jem Finer and James Fearnley, led a 2025 tour celebrating the 40th anniversary of their seminal album "Rum, Sodomy and the Lash." The tour featured a total of 15 performers, bringing new life and new arrangements to many of The Pogues classics.

== Other appearances ==
After the Pogues' break-up, Stacy briefly formed a new band, Wisemen—soon renamed The Vendettas—which included ex-Pogues Andrew Ranken and Darryl Hunt (as well as Kavus Torabi of The Monsoon Bassoon, Cardiacs, and Gong). Stacy has also appeared in both live performances and on recordings with other musicians, including Astral Social Club, Filthy Thievin' Bastards, and longtime friend Steve Earle. In 2005, Stacy performed two songs, including "Joe Hill", with Patti Smith, at the Meltdown festival. In 2007, he appeared on the Dropkick Murphys' version of "Flannigan's Ball" with Ronnie Drew of The Dubliners. In 2015, Stacy teamed up with Cajun music band Lost Bayou Ramblers to perform Pogues songs under the name Poguetry in Motion, later shortened to Poguetry. In 2018, he was joined by original Pogues bassist Cait O'Riordan. In February and March 2020, Poguetry played an eight-date tour of the US. In December 2022, Spider collaborated with Brooklyn-based punk band The So So Glos for the holiday single "This Could Be Christmas".

== Acting ==
Stacy has appeared in several movies and television productions, including the Alex Cox films Straight to Hell (1987) and Walker (1987), as well as the Peter Richardson-directed Eat the Rich (1987).

Starting in 2011, he played "Slim Jim" Lynch in the HBO series Treme (2010–13), appearing in two seasons. The series, which is set in New Orleans, was co-created by The Wire (2002–2008) creator David Simon. Several Pogues songs had been featured in The Wire, and Stacy was introduced to both Simon and The Wire/Treme writer and novelist George Pelecanos backstage after a Pogues performance in Washington, D.C. Stacy's friendship with Pelecanos later led to a 2009 performance featuring the Pogues at the Boogaloo, a London pub. Pelecanos read excerpts from his then-new novel, The Way Home, followed by the Pogues' first pub performance since 1983.

== Personal life ==
In 2010, Stacy and his wife, Louise, purchased a home in New Orleans.
