= Jem Finer =

English musician (born 1955)

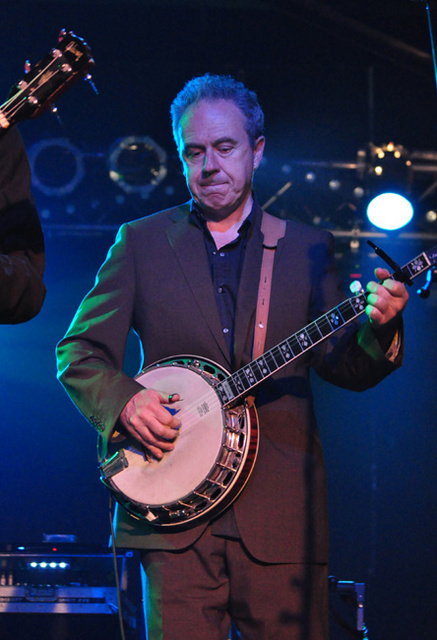
- Jem Finer performing as part of The Pogues in 2010

Background information
- Born: Jeremy Max Finer; 20 July 1955 (age 71); Stoke-on-Trent, Staffordshire, England
- Genres: Celtic punk; folk punk; electronic; experimental; field recording
- Occupations: Musician; composer
- Instruments: Banjo; mandola; guitar; saxophone; hurdy-gurdy
- Years active: 1977–present

Jeremy Max Finer (born 20 July 1955) is an English musician, artist and composer. He is one of the founding members of the Pogues.

== Early life ==
Finer was born in Stoke-on-Trent, England, the son of political scientist Samuel Finer, and the nephew of political scientist Herman Finer. He lived at 'The Mount' on Legh Road, in the east of Knutsford, from 1966. He grew up in a Jewish family, though his parents also attended the General Assembly of Unitarian and Free Christian Churches, an open-faith community. His sister Jessica attended Wilmslow County Grammar School for Girls, gaining four O-levels in 1976. Brother Josiah was born in 1963.

He took a joint degree in computing and sociology at Keele University. After college, he travelled around Europe and spent some time working on a barge in France. He settled in London, where he met Shane MacGowan, Spider Stacy, and James Fearnley, with whom he founded the Pogues. He has worked in a variety of fields, including photography, film, experimental and popular music and installation.

== Career ==
Primarily a banjoist with the Pogues, he occasionally played other instruments including mandola, saxophone, hurdy-gurdy and the guitar. Apart from MacGowan (with whom he co-wrote several songs, including "Fairytale of New York"), Finer was the most prolific composer for the band.

He appeared on all the band's albums until their breakup in 1996, one of only three original members who remained. During that time he also appeared on MacGowan's solo album The Snake and The Levellers' self-titled release; he continued working as a musician and composer after leaving the Pogues, and in 2024 and 2025 rejoined Spider Stacy and James Fearnley as The Pogues for a series of live shows celebrating the albums Red Roses For Me and Rum Sodomy & the Lash.

On 31 December 1999, the Finer-composed Longplayer piece of music was started; this is designed to last one-thousand years without ever repeating itself to 31 December 2999, and as currently implemented exists in both computer-generated and live versions. Longplayer represents a convergence of many of his concerns, particularly those relating to systems, long-durational processes and extremes of scale in both time and space.

Finer was Artist in Residence at the Astrophysics sub-department of the University of Oxford between October 2003 and June 2005, making a number of works including two sculptural observatories, Landscope and The Centre of the Universe. Finer and Hamburg-based swamp pop legend DM Bob have recorded and performed together since 2005, releasing their album Bum Steer in August of that year and co-producing the debut album by the experimental pop band Marseille Figs. He has written articles on copyright and the Creative Commons License. In July 2005, Finer won the PRS Foundation New Music Award on the basis of his proposal to build a device that will automatically "compose" a song of indeterminate length by harnessing the creative force of the weather. His proposal read:

The countryside is shot through with holes in the ground; wells, mine shafts, fissures, bunkers, ventilation holes. In this piece of music the venue is a deep shaft in which there will be placed, at different heights, bowls of different sizes and tunings pivoted about their center of gravity, the instruments. The players, the drips of water, will strike the bowls, ringing them like bells. As they fill with water their timbres will change, and the delicate equilibrium of their pivots will cause them to sway slightly, modulating the tones. Overflowing, a bowl will drip into ones below it.
Amplification will be facilitated by a tube rising up from within the shaft, into a brass horn twenty feet above the surface. Akin to the bamboo tube in the Sui-kink Tsu, the horn not only amplifies the sounds but forms a sculptural object, a focus in the landscape. The work was constructed and installed in King's Wood near Challock, Kent over the summer of 2006.

In March 2012, Finer launched Mobile Sinfonia, a global composition for ringtones, after developing it during a year spent as a non-resident artist at the University of Bath. This piece concerns mutual invasion of soundscape via ringtones. He later received an honorary doctorate from Bath.

He is working on a number of new projects, continuing his interest in long-term sustainability and the reconfiguring of older technologies. These include a series of hurdy-gurdy recordings, Spiegelei (a spherical camera obscura featuring Finer's innovative 360-degree projection system), and Supercomputer, a 5 bit mechanical sculpture which computes minimal musical scores.
