= The Pogues =

English Celtic punk band

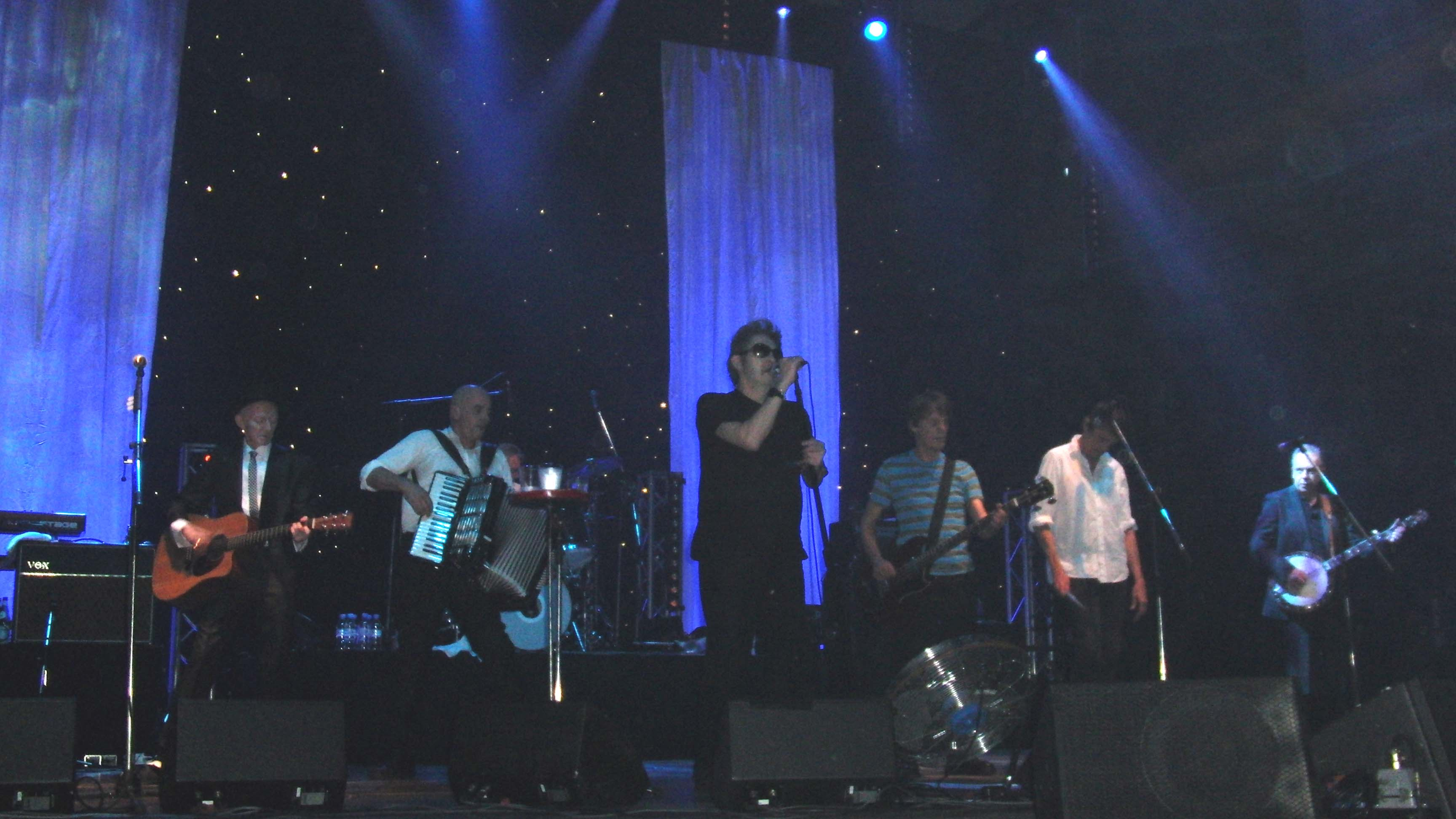
- The Pogues performing in Munich in 2011. From left to right: Philip Chevron, James Fearnley, Andrew Ranken, Shane MacGowan, Darryl Hunt, Spider Stacy and Jem Finer.

Background information
- Also known as: Pogue Mahone (1982–1984)
- Origin: King's Cross, London, England
- Genres: Celtic punk; folk punk
- Years active: 1982–1996, 2001–2014, 2024–present
- Labels: Stiff; Island; Pogue Mahone; Chameleon
- Members: Spider Stacy; Jem Finer; James Fearnley
- Past members: Shane MacGowan; Darryl Hunt; Andrew Ranken; Terry Woods; Cait O'Riordan; Philip Chevron; Joe Strummer; Dave Coulter; James McNally; Jamie Clarke; John Hasler
- Website: pogues.com

The Pogues are an English Celtic punk band (Note: The band's current members, Spider Stacy, Jem Finer, and James Fearnley, are English. While, prior to the band reforming, it was often labelled as variously "English", "Anglo-Irish", "Hiberno-English" or simply "Irish", amongst others, the band had described itself as "all English" in interviews and band members such as Jem Finer and Philip Chevron, once the band's only Irish-born member, objected to the "Irish" label to describe the band, and James Fearnley referred to the band as "for the most part English". The band faced accusations of cultural appropriation or insensitivity as an English band playing traditionally Irish music. With the departure of Shane MacGowan in 1991, Darryl Hunt explained that, with the loss of the band's only founding member with Irish heritage, the Pogues "respected [...] everybody's culture" and took "energy and ideas" from Irish music as well as elsewhere.) founded in King's Cross, London, in 1982, by Shane MacGowan, Spider Stacy and Jem Finer. Originally named Pogue Mahone—an anglicisation of the Irish phrase póg mo thóin, meaning "kiss my arse"—the band fused Irish traditional music with punk rock influences. After adding more members, including James Fearnley and Cait O'Riordan, the Pogues built a reputation with their live shows in London pubs and clubs.

In 1984, the Pogues released their debut studio album, Red Roses for Me, featuring a mix of traditional Irish songs and original compositions by MacGowan. It was followed by Rum Sodomy & the Lash (1985), the four-track EP Poguetry in Motion (1986), and the critically acclaimed If I Should Fall from Grace with God (1988). "Fairytale of New York", recorded as a duet by MacGowan and Kirsty MacColl, reached number two in the UK charts at Christmas 1987 and remains a perennial seasonal favourite in Ireland and the UK. The Pogues recorded two more albums with MacGowan, Peace and Love (1989) and Hell's Ditch (1990), before sacking him during a 1991 tour as his drug and alcohol dependency increasingly affected their live performances.

The Pogues continued with Joe Strummer and then Stacy as frontmen, releasing new material on Waiting for Herb (1993), but broke up following the critical and commercial failure of their seventh and last studio album, Pogue Mahone (1996). The band re-formed in late 2001, again featuring MacGowan as frontman, and toured regularly in the UK, Ireland, mainland Europe, and the USA for over a decade. Following the death of longtime guitarist Philip Chevron, the Pogues dissolved again in 2014. Longtime bassist Darryl Hunt died in August 2022 and MacGowan died in November 2023. Stacy, Finer and Fearnley re-formed the Pogues in 2024 and toured the UK, Ireland, and North America in 2025.

== Band history ==
=== Pre-Pogues years: 1977–1982 ===
The future members of the Pogues first met when MacGowan (vocals), Peter "Spider" Stacy (tin whistle), and Jem Finer (banjo) were together in an occasional band called the Millwall Chainsaws in the late 1970s after MacGowan and Stacy met in the toilets at a Ramones gig at The Roundhouse in London in 1977. MacGowan was already with the Nips, though when they broke up in 1980 he concentrated more on Stacy's Millwall Chainsaws, who changed their name to The New Republicans. Shane and Stacy performed their first gig as The New Republicans at Richard Strange's Cabaret Futura in London's Rupert Street Soho in the early months of 1981. Also on the bill that night were Soft Cell.

=== Early years: 1982–1986 ===
"Haunted"
Sample of Caitlín O'Riordan singing "Haunted" with the Pogues.

In 1982, MacGowan, Stacy and Finer formed the band, then known as Pogue Mahone. James Fearnley, who had been a guitarist with the Nips, joined shortly afterward. Fearnley has noted that Stacy suggested the band's original name, taken from a sentence in James Joyce's Ulysses, where the character Buck Mulligan exclaims: "Pogue mahone! Acushla machree! It's destroyed we are from this day! It's destroyed we are surely!" "Pogue mahone" is an anglicisation of the Irish phrase póg mo thóin, meaning "kiss my arse". The new group played their first gig at The Pindar of Wakefield on 4 October 1982.

By their show on Friday 29 October 1982 at 100 Club in London, Cait O'Riordan (bass) and John Hasler (drums) had joined the band, with Andrew Ranken replacing Hasler on drums in March 1983. Pogue Mahone appeared on Thursday 3 November 1983 at Gossips in Dean Street Soho with Trash Trash Trash and The Stingrays.

The band played London pubs and clubs, and released a single, "Dark Streets of London", on their own, self-named label, gaining a small reputation – especially for their live performances, and national airplay on BBC Radio 1, primarily on David Jensen's evening show. They came to the attention of the media and Stiff Records when they opened for the Clash on their 1984 tour. Following complaints from a producer at BBC Radio Scotland about the band's name, Jensen began referring to the band on air as "the Pogues", which the band subsequently adopted as their name. They released their first album, Red Roses for Me, on Stiff Records that October.

The band gained more attention when the UK Channel 4's music show The Tube made a video of their version of "Waxie's Dargle" for the show. The performance, featuring Spider Stacy repeatedly smashing himself over the head with a beer tray, became a favourite with the viewers, but Stiff Records refused to release it as a single, feeling it was too late for it to help Red Roses for Me. Nevertheless, it remained a favourite request for the show for many years.

With the aid of producer Elvis Costello, they recorded the follow-up, Rum Sodomy & the Lash, in 1985 during which time guitarist Philip Chevron joined. The album title is a famous comment falsely attributed to Winston Churchill who was supposedly describing the "true" traditions of the British Royal Navy. The album cover featured The Raft of the Medusa, with the faces of the characters in Théodore Géricault's painting replaced with those of the band members. The album shows the band moving away from covers to original material. Shane MacGowan came into his own as a songwriter with this disc, offering up poetic storytelling, such as "The Sick Bed of Cúchulainn" and "The Old Main Drag", as well as definitive interpretations of Ewan MacColl's "Dirty Old Town" and Eric Bogle's "And the Band Played Waltzing Matilda" (this had previously been covered by Shane's fellow punk contemporaries Skids in 1981).

The band failed to take advantage of the momentum created by the strong artistic and commercial success of their second album. They first refused to record another album (offering up the four-track EP Poguetry in Motion instead); O'Riordan married Costello and left the band, to be replaced by bassist Darryl Hunt, formerly of Plummet Airlines and Pride of the Cross; and they added a multi-instrumentalist in Terry Woods, formerly of Steeleye Span. Looming over the band at this period (as throughout their entire career) was the increasingly erratic behaviour of their vocalist and principal songwriter, Shane MacGowan. Their record label, Stiff Records, went bankrupt soon after the 1987 release of the single "The Irish Rover" (with the Dubliners). Members of the band, including O'Riordan, acted in Alex Cox's Straight to Hell, and five songs by the band were included on the film's soundtrack album.

=== Mainstream success and break-up: 1987–1996 ===
The band remained stable enough to record If I Should Fall from Grace with God with its Christmas hit duet with Kirsty MacColl "Fairytale of New York". "Fairytale of New York" was released as a single in 1987 and reached No. 1 in the Irish charts and No. 2 in the British charts over Christmas (the time of peak sales). The song has become a festive classic in the UK and Ireland over the years, and was voted the best Christmas song of all time three years running in 2004, 2005, and 2006 in polls by music channel VH1 UK, despite not achieving Christmas Number One when it was released. It was also voted as the 27th greatest song never to reach No. 1 in the UK in another VH1 poll, and also voted as the 84th greatest song of all time by BBC Radio 2 listeners in the "Sold on Song" top 100 poll. In 2007 the record was briefly censored by the BBC because of the word "faggot" being deemed potentially offensive to homosexual people. Following protests from listeners, including the mother of Kirsty MacColl, the censorship was lifted.

In 1989, the band released Peace and Love, a jazzier record featuring six tracks written by MacGowan, as well as eight tracks written by band members Jem Finer, Terry Woods, Andrew Ranken, and Philip Chevron. As Mark Deming wrote in AllMusic, "It does make clear that MacGowan was hardly the only talented songwriter in the band – though the fact that the set's most memorable songs were written by others did not bode well for the group's future."

The band was at the peak of its commercial success, with both albums making the top five in the UK (numbers 3 and 5 respectively), but MacGowan was increasingly unreliable. He failed to turn up for the opening dates of their 1988 tour of America, and prevented the band from promoting their 1990 album Hell's Ditch, so in 1991 the band sacked him following a chaotic live performance at the WOMAD Festival held in Japan. Vocal duties were for a time handled by Joe Strummer. Spider Stacy took over permanently after Strummer left in the winter of 1991. After Strummer's departure, the remaining seven Pogues recorded in 1993 Waiting for Herb, which contained the band's third and final top twenty single, "Tuesday Morning" which was written and sung by Spider Stacy.

Terry Woods and James Fearnley subsequently left the band and were replaced by David Coulter and James McNally respectively. Within months of their departures, ill health forced Phil Chevron to leave the band; he was replaced by his former guitar technician, Jamie Clarke. This line-up recorded the band's seventh and final studio album, Pogue Mahone. The album was a commercial failure, and, following Jem Finer's decision to leave the band in 1996, the remaining members decided it was time to quit. According to Shane MacGowan, among the reasons of the break-up was disagreement concerning the political orientation of his songs, the band not wanting to sing too obvious pro-Republican songs – though some of their previous songs were already politically engaged: for instance, "Streams of Whiskey" is about the poet and IRA member Brendan Behan. Soon after the break-up Shane MacGowan recorded a song titled "Paddy Public Enemy Number One" as a tribute to the Republican leader Dominic McGlinchey, a former leader of the INLA killed a few years before.

=== Post-breakup ===
After the Pogues's break-up, the three remaining long-term members (Spider Stacy, Andrew Ranken and Darryl Hunt) played together briefly as The Vendettas. They played mainly new Stacy-penned tracks, though Darryl Hunt also contributed songs, and the band's live set included a few Pogues songs. First Ranken then Hunt left the band, the latter going on to become singer/songwriter in an indie band called Bish, whose self-titled debut album was released in 2001. Ranken later performed with a number of other bands, including Kippers, The Municipal Waterboard and, most recently, The Mysterious Wheels. In addition to The Vendettas, who Stacy freely admits lost all attraction when the Pogues reformed, Spider continued to write and record music with various bands, including the James Walbourne, Filthy Thieving Bastards, Dropkick Murphys and Astral Social Club.

Shane MacGowan founded Shane MacGowan and The Popes in 1992. They released two studio albums and broke up in 2006 once the Pogues' reunion had become official. His autobiography A Drink With Shane MacGowan, co-written with his journalist girlfriend Victoria Mary Clarke, was released in 2001. Jem Finer went into experimental music, playing a big part in a project known as "Longplayer", a piece of music designed to play continuously for 1,000 years without repeating itself. In 2005, Finer released the album Bum Steer with DB Bob (as DM Bob and Country Jem).

James Fearnley moved to the United States shortly before leaving the Pogues. He was a member of The Low And Sweet Orchestra and later the Cranky George Trio. Philip Chevron reformed his former band The Radiators, which briefly included former Pogue Cait O'Riordan. Terry Woods formed The Bucks with Ron Kavana, releasing the album Dancin' To The Ceili Band in 1994. Later, he formed The Woods Band, releasing the album Music From The Four Corners of Hell in 2002.

=== Reunion: 2001–2014 ===
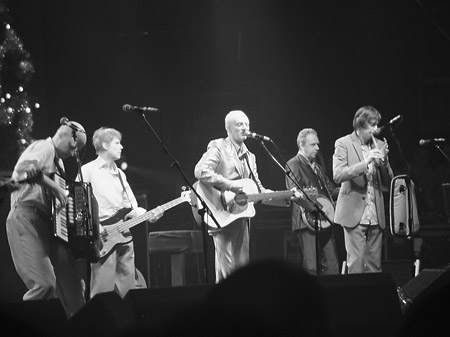
The Pogues in Brixton, 2004

The band, including MacGowan, re-formed for a Christmas tour in 2001 and performed nine shows in the UK and Ireland in December 2004. In 2002 Q magazine named the Pogues one of the "50 Bands To See Before You Die". In July 2005, the band – again including MacGowan – played at the annual Guilfest festival in Guildford before flying out to Japan where they played three dates. Japan is the last place they all played together before MacGowan was originally sacked in 1991, and they have a strong following there.

The band played a date in Spain in September 2005. The reunited Pogues played dates in the UK with support from the Dropkick Murphys in late 2005, and re-released their 1987 Christmas classic "Fairytale of New York" on 19 December, which went straight in at No. 3 in the UK Singles charts on Christmas Day 2005, showing the song's enduring popularity. On 22 December 2005 the BBC broadcast a live performance (recorded the previous week) on the Jonathan Ross Christmas show with Katie Melua filling in for the late Kirsty MacColl, the first time the band had played the song live on television. The following week they performed live on the music show CD:UK.

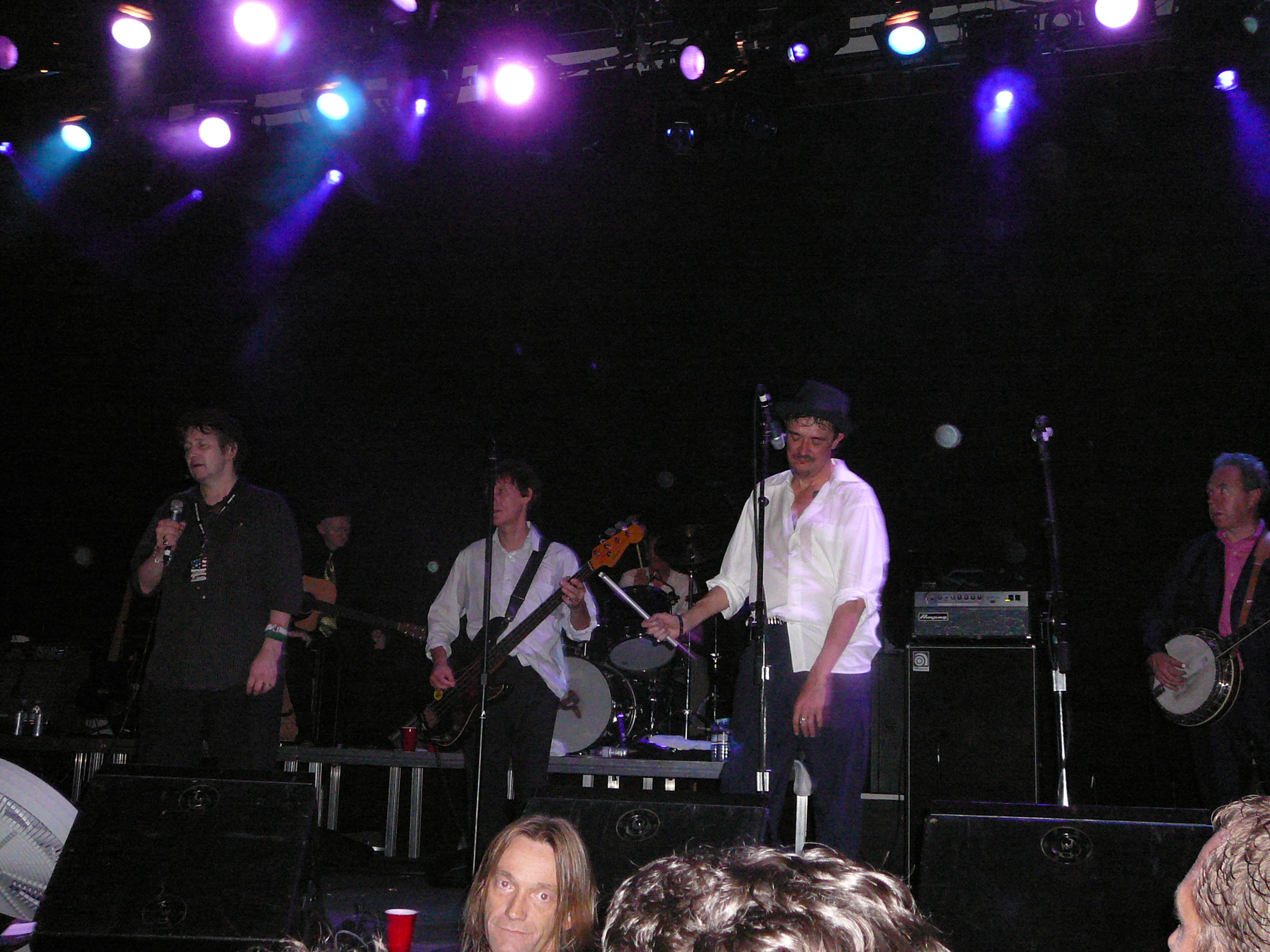
The Pogues with Shane MacGowan, 11 October 2006 in San Diego

The band was awarded the lifetime achievement award at the annual Meteor Ireland Music Awards in February 2006. In March 2006, the band played their first US dates with Shane in over 15 years. The band played a series of sold-out concerts in Washington, D.C., Atlantic City, Boston, and New York. Later they played a series of sold-out gigs during mid-October 2006 in San Francisco, Las Vegas, and Los Angeles, and toured Glasgow, Manchester, Birmingham, London, Dublin, and Nottingham in mid-December 2006. They began a second US tour in March 2007, once again to coincide (and conclude) with a Roseland Ballroom New York City show on Saint Patrick's Day. 2007 proved to be their most prolific year of touring since the reunion with a tour of the west coast of America and eleven dates in the UK in December. The band also made festival appearances in the summer across Europe (Sweden, Belgium and Spain).

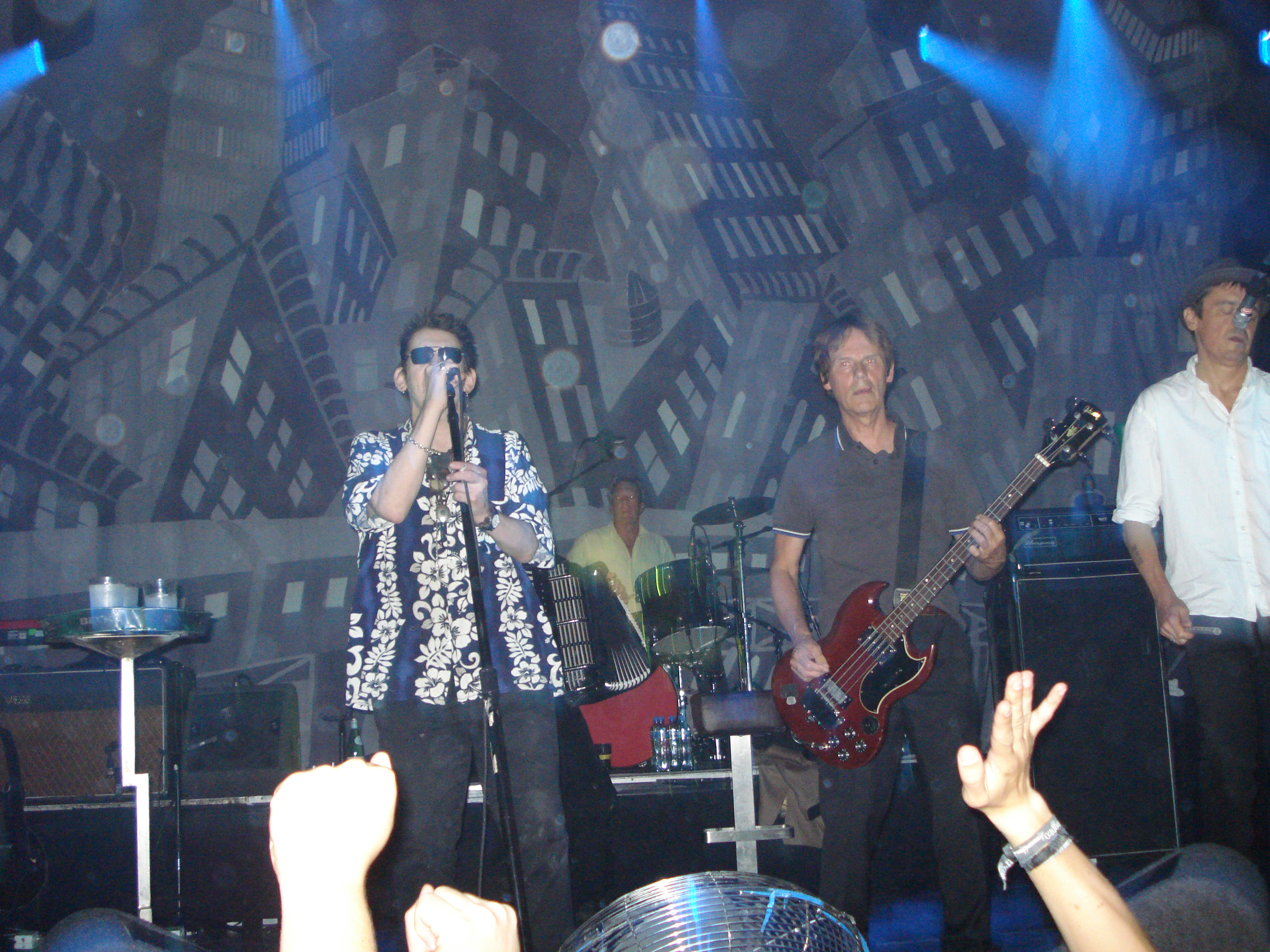
The Pogues on 1 August 2010 in Amsterdam

Guitarist Phil Chevron stated there were no plans to record new music or release a new album. Chevron said that one way to keep enjoying what they were doing was to avoid making a new album, although he did say that there still was a possibility in the future for new music, but certainly not in the near future. Terry Woods commented that MacGowan had been writing, and most of it sounds good. In 2008 the band released a box set Just Look Them Straight in the Eye and Say....POGUE MAHONE!!, which included rare studio outtakes and previously unreleased material.

The band received mixed reviews of their performances though they continued to pull the crowds. Reviewing a March 2008 concert, The Washington Post described MacGowan as "puffy and paunchy", but said the singer "still has a banshee wail to beat Howard Dean's, and the singer's abrasive growl is all a band this marvelous needs to give its amphetamine-spiked take on Irish folk a focal point". The reviewer continued: "The set started off shaky, MacGowan singing of 'goin' where streams of whiskey are flowin,' and looking like he'd arrived there already. He grew more lucid and powerful as the evening gathered steam, through two hours and 26 songs, mostly from the Pogues' first three (and best) albums". In December 2010 the Pogues (with support from Crowns) played what was billed as a farewell UK Christmas tour.

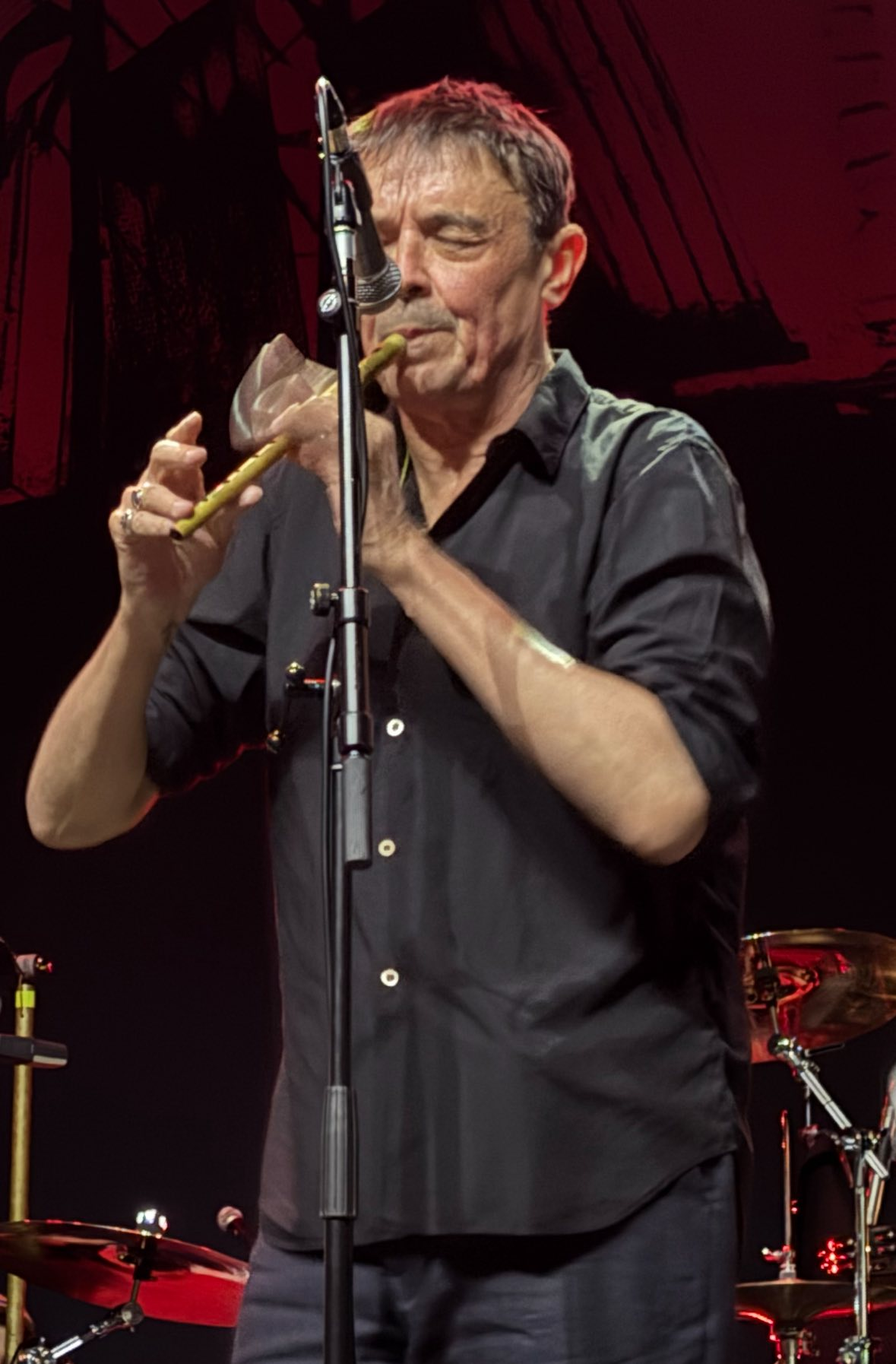
Spider Stacy of The Pogues playing the tin whistle.

In March 2011, the Pogues played a six-city/ten-show sold out US tour titled "A Parting Glass with The Pogues" visiting Chicago, Detroit, Baltimore, Washington, D.C., Boston, and New York City (in that order), with only the last three cities getting more than one show. Stacy said "I think we are basically pretty certain this is the last tour of this type we'll be doing in the States. There might be the odd sort of one-off here and there. We're not saying this is absolutely, definitely the end".

In August 2012, the Pogues embarked on a 30th Anniversary Summer 2012 8-city European Tour scheduled from 4 August 2012 at the Stockton Weekender Festival in Stockton-on-Tees, UK to 11 and 12 September 2012 at L'Olympia, Paris, two shows filmed and recorded for a live album and DVD released on 19 November 2012.

In March 2013, the Pogues released 30:30: The Essential Collection, a two-disc set featuring 30 songs along with eleven videos. In October 2013, the Pogues released a box set titled Pogues 30 containing remastered versions of all of their studio albums plus a previously unreleased live album featuring Joe Strummer at the London Forum in December 1991.

Guitarist Philip Chevron died on 8 October 2013 in Dublin, Ireland from oesophageal cancer, aged 56.

In December 2013, the Pogues went on a four-date UK Christmas tour, followed by a few shows during spring and summer 2014. (Note: On 31 May 2014 at the Rock in Idro festival (Arena Joe Strummer) in Bologna, Italy; on 14 June 2014 at Thetford Forest (High Lodge), Suffolk, England, UK; on 26 June 2014 at Bristol Harbour, Bristol, England, UK; on 5 July 2014 at the British Summer Time Festival (Hyde Park), London, England, UK; on 27 July 2014 at the Fuji Rock Festival (Naeba Ski Resort), Niigata, Japan; on 9 July 2014 at the "Fête du bruit dans Landerneau" Festival, Landerneau, Brittany, France.) The Pogues' last performance on British soil occurred on 6 July 2014 at the British Summer Time festival in London's Hyde Park. The Pogues' last ever performance with Shane MacGowan occurred on 9 August 2014 during the "Fête du bruit dans Landerneau" festival in Landerneau, Brittany, France.

=== Post-split: 2014–2024 ===
In a December 2015 interview with Vice magazine, when asked whether the band were still active, Shane MacGowan said: "We're not, no", saying that, since their 2001 reunion happened, "I went back with [the] Pogues and we grew to hate each other all over again", adding, "I don't hate the band at all – they're friends. I like them a lot. We were friends for years before we joined the band. We just got a bit sick of each other. We're friends as long as we don't tour together. I've done a hell of a lot of touring. I've had enough of it".

Long-time Pogues bassist Darryl Hunt died in London on 8 August 2022, at the age of 72.

Shane MacGowan died in Dublin on 30 November 2023, at the age of 65. The next day, "Fairytale of New York" went to No. 1 in Ireland. His funeral was held on 8 December 2023. MacGowan's wicker coffin was borne through the streets of Dublin on a horse-drawn carriage as fans lined the streets for his funeral procession. Later, hundreds gathered inside and outside Saint Mary of the Rosary Church in Nenagh, County Tipperary, including celebrities Nick Cave, Johnny Depp, BP Fallon, Bob Geldof, Aidan Gillen, President of Ireland Michael D. Higgins and former Sinn Féin leader Gerry Adams. The surviving Pogues reunited to perform "The Parting Glass", and there was dancing inside the church as "Fairytale of New York" was performed with Glen Hansard, Lisa O'Neill and John Sheahan from the Dubliners. On 13 December 2023, the Pogues reissued "Fairytale of New York" as a charity 7-inch single in tribute to MacGowan and to benefit the Dublin Simon Community, an organization fighting homelessness that MacGowan had supported.

=== Second reunion: 2024–present ===
On 3 May 2024, surviving members Finer, Fearnley and Stacy performed Pogues songs with a variety of guest musicians and vocalists at Hackney Empire, London, to celebrate the fortieth anniversary of Red Roses for Me. The ensemble reconvened at Dublin's 3Arena on 17 December 2024, for a second performance.

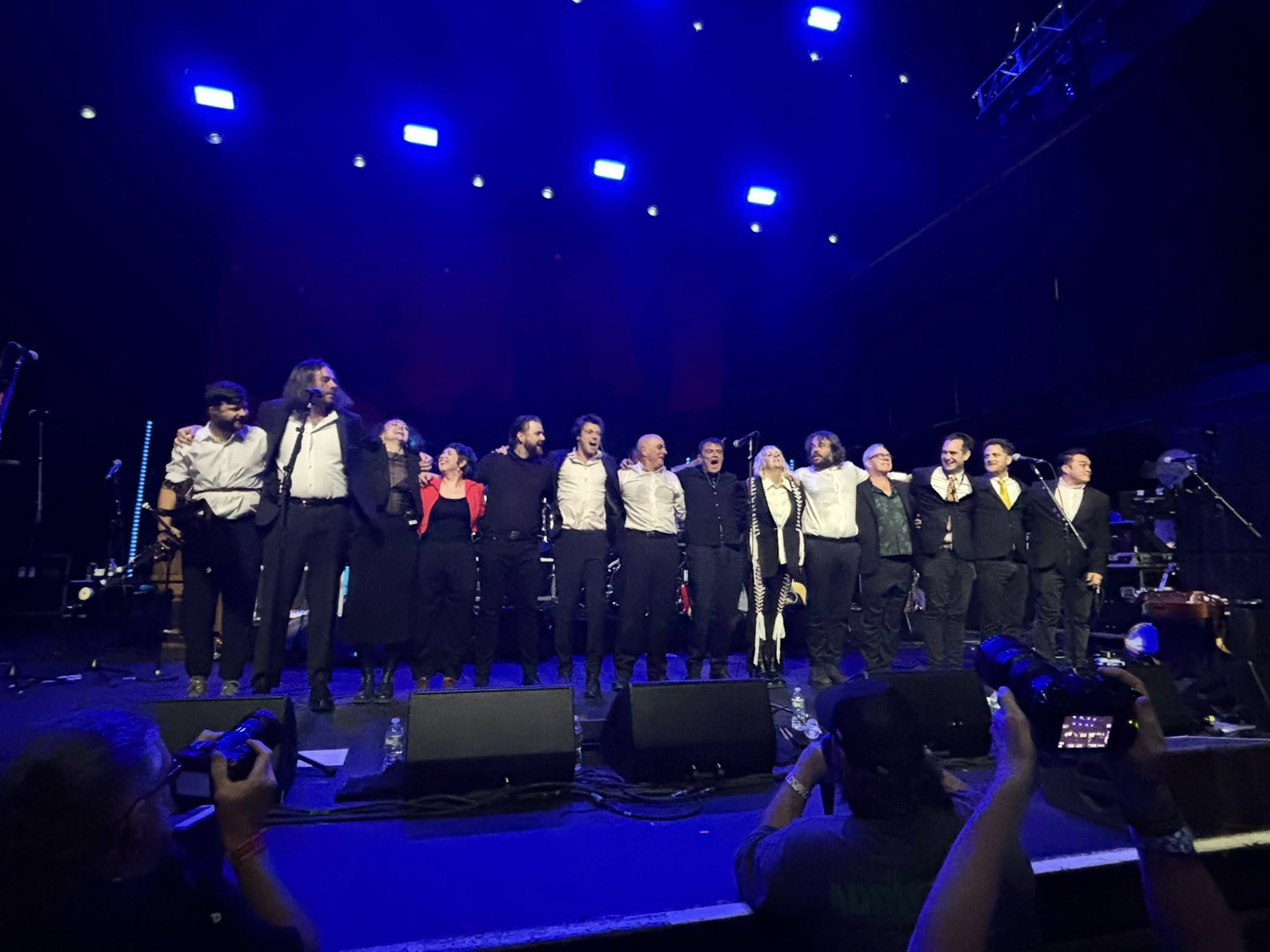
The expanded Pogues lineup takes a bow after the first of two sold out shows at Terminal 5 in New York City on 16 September 2025

The re-formed band subsequently announced that they would be touring the UK and Ireland in 2025 to mark the fortieth anniversary of their second album, Rum Sodomy & the Lash. The six-date UK tour commenced on 1 May in Leeds (at the O2 Academy) and ended on 8 May 2025 in Newcastle (at the O2 City Hall), making stops in Birmingham, London, Glasgow and Manchester. The band played in its entirety their 1985 LP Rum Sodomy & the Lash (Note: ... featuring the fan-favourite tracks "Rainy Night in Soho", "A Pair of Brown Eyes" and "Dirty Old Town".) along with B-sides, extended version tracks and a special selection of their most known material. They were joined by a number of guest vocalists as lead singers on several songs.

On 1 April 2025, Fearnley, Finer and Stacy announced a 7-date North American leg of the tour due to kick off on 5 September in Washington, D.C. (at Lincoln Theater) and to conclude on 16 and 17 September 2025 in New York (at Terminal 5), making stops in Boston, Philadelphia, Toronto, Ottawa, and Montreal.

The tour was met with widespread praise and featured six different lead vocalists and an all-star band. Joining original members Spider Stacy (vocals, tin whistle), Jem Finer (banjo, hurdy gurdy, mandolin), and James Fearnley (accordion, whistling), were Iona Zajac on vocals and clarsach, Lisa O'Neill on vocals and autoharp, Nadine Shah on vocals, John Francis Flynn on vocals, guitar, & banjo, Daragh Lynch (Lankum) on vocals and guitar, Jordan O'Leary (formerly of The Scratch) on vocals, banjo, and guitar, Holly Mullineaux (Goat Girl) on bass, Jim Sclavunos (Nick Cave and the Bad Seeds) on drums, Fiachra Meek (Alfí) on uilleann pipes and tin whistle, and a horn section consisting of saxophonist Pete Fraser, trumpeter Daniel Hayes, and trombonist Ian Williamson.

In November of that year, an 11-date tour of Australia and New Zealand was announced for March and April 2026, featuring the same lineup minus Shah.

Longtime drummer Andrew Ranken died on 10 February 2026, aged 72, after a long struggle with COPD.

On 11 March 2026, the band announced a winter 2026 UK and European 'Greatest Hits' tour entitled "The Pogues Play The Hits" tour, running 16 dates from 19 November to 12 December 2026 with stops in Germany, the Netherlands, UK and Ireland, once again featuring Fearnley, Finer and Stacy joined by their current touring line-up, i.e. a variety of special guest musicians and singers. A 17th date on 26 November at L'Olympia in France was later added.

== Members ==
=== Current members ===
- Spider Stacy – vocals, tin whistle (1982–1996, 2001–2014, 2024–present)
- Jem Finer – banjo, mandola, saxophone, hurdy-gurdy, guitar, vocals (1982–1996, 2001–2014, 2024–present)
- James Fearnley – accordion, mandolin, piano, guitar (1982–1993, 2001–2014, 2024–present)

==== Current touring musicians ====
- Iona Zajac – vocals, clarsach (2024–present)
- Lisa O'Neill – vocals, autoharp (2024–present)
- John Francis Flynn – vocals, guitar, banjo (2024–present)
- Daragh Lynch – guitar, vocals (2024–present)
- Jordan O'Leary – banjo, guitar, vocals (2024–present)
- Holly Mullineaux – bass, vocals (2024–present)
- Jim Sclavunos – drums, percussion (2024–present)
- Fiachra Meek – uilleann pipes, tin whistle (2024–present)
- Pete Fraser – saxophone (2024–present)
- Dan Hayes – trumpet (2024–present)
- Ian Williamson – trombone, harmonica (2024–present)

=== Former members ===
- Shane MacGowan – vocals, guitar, banjo, bodhrán, piano (1982–1991, 2001–2014; died 2023)
- Cait O'Riordan – bass, vocals (1982–1986, 2004)
- John Hasler – drums (1982–1983)
- Andrew Ranken – drums, percussion, harmonica, vocals (1983–1996, 2001–2014; died 2026)
- Philip Chevron – guitar, vocals, mandolin, banjo (1985–1994, 2001–2013; his death)
- Darryl Hunt – bass, vocals (1986–1996, 2001–2014; died 2022)
- Terry Woods – mandolin, cittern, concertina, guitar, vocals (1986–1993, 2001–2014)
- Joe Strummer – vocals, guitar (1987, 1991–1992; touring; died 2002)
- Dave Coulter – mandolin, violin, ukulele, percussion (1993–1996)
- James McNally – accordion, piano, whistles, percussion (1993–1996)
- Jamie Clarke – guitar, vocals (1994–1996)
- James Walbourne – guitar (2014, 2024–2025; touring)
- Nadine Shah – vocals (2024–2025; touring)
- Tom Coll – drums, percussion (2024; touring)

== Discography ==
- Red Roses for Me (1984)
- Rum Sodomy & the Lash (1985)
- If I Should Fall from Grace with God (1988)
- Peace and Love (1989)
- Hell's Ditch (1990)
- Waiting for Herb (1993)
- Pogue Mahone (1996)
