= The Best of The Pogues =

The Best of the Pogues

Greatest hits album by The Pogues
- Released: September 7, 1991
- Recorded: 1984–1991
- Genre: Celtic punk; folk punk; Celtic rock; folk rock
- Label: Pogue Music
- Producer: Various

The Pogues chronology
Hell's Ditch (1990)	The Best of the Pogues (1991)	Essential Pogues (1991)

Professional ratings
Review scores
Source	Rating
AllMusic	3/5 stars

The Best of the Pogues is a greatest hits album by the Pogues, released in September 1991.

The album was dedicated to the memory of Deborah Korner – the partner of Pogues drummer Andrew Ranken – who died a few months before the album's release.

== Track listing ==
1. "Fairytale of New York" (Shane MacGowan, Jem Finer)
2. "Sally MacLennane" (MacGowan)
3. "Dirty Old Town" (Ewan MacColl)
4. "The Irish Rover" (Traditional, arr. The Pogues & The Dubliners)
5. "A Pair of Brown Eyes" (MacGowan)
6. "Streams of Whiskey" (MacGowan)
7. "Rainy Night in Soho" (MacGowan)
8. "Fiesta" (MacGowan, Finer, Kotscher, Lindt)
9. "Rain Street" (MacGowan)
10. "Misty Morning, Albert Bridge" (Finer)
11. "White City" (MacGowan)
12. "Thousands Are Sailing" (Phil Chevron)
13. "The Broad Majestic Shannon" (MacGowan)
14. "The Body of an American" (MacGowan)

== Personnel ==
- Shane MacGowan – lead vocals, guitar
- Terry Woods – cittern, vocals
- Philip Chevron – guitar, vocals
- Spider Stacy – tin whistle, vocals
- Andrew Ranken – drums
- Jem Finer – banjo, saxophone
- Darryl Hunt – bass guitar
- Kirsty MacColl – vocals on "Fairytale of New York"
- James Fearnley – accordion

=== Other musicians ===
- Cait O'Riordan – bass, vocals
- Siobhan Sheahan – harp on "Fairytale of New York"
- Tommy Keane – Uileann pipes on "Dirty Old Town" and "The Body of an American"
- Henry Benagh – fiddle
- Elvis Costello – acoustic guitar
- Dick Cuthell – flugelhorn on "A Rainy Night in Soho"
- Brian Clarke – alto saxophone on "Fiesta"
- Joe Cashman – tenor saxophone on "Fiesta"
- Eli Thompson – trumpet on "Fiesta"
- Chris Lee – trumpet
- Paul Taylor – trombone
- Ron Kavana – tenor banjo, mandolin on "Thousands Are Sailing"

== Charts ==
Chart performance for The Best of the Pogues
Chart (1991)	Peak position
Australian Albums (ARIA)	94
New Zealand Albums (RMNZ)	10
Swedish Albums (Sverigetopplistan)	34
Swiss Albums (Schweizer Hitparade)	25
UK Albums (OCC)	11

2000 chart performance for The Best of the Pogues
Chart (2000)	Peak position
Irish Albums (IRMA)	21

== Certifications and sales ==
Region	Certification	Certified units/sales
Australia (ARIA)	Gold	35,000^{^}
France (SNEP)	Gold	100,000^{*}
New Zealand (RMNZ)	Platinum	15,000^{^}
United Kingdom (BPI)	Gold	100,000^{*}
^{*} Sales figures based on certification alone.^{^} Shipments figures based on certification alone.

== Notes ==
- "Dirty Old Town" written by Ewan MacColl sung by MacGowan and members of The Dubliners
- Tracks produced by Steve Lillywhite except tracks 2, 3, 5 and 14 – Elvis Costello, track 4 – Eamonn Campbell, track 6 – Stan Brennan and track 9 – Joe Strummer
