= Essential Pogues =

Greatest hits album by The Pogues
- Released: 19 November 1991
- Genre: Celtic punk; folk punk; Celtic rock; folk rock
- Length: 53:37
- Label: Island Records (Polygram Records)
- Producer: Various

The Pogues chronology
The Best of The Pogues (1991)	Essential Pogues (1991)	Waiting for Herb (1993)

Professional ratings
Review scores
Source	Rating
AllMusic	4.5/5 stars

Essential Pogues is a greatest hits album by The Pogues, released in November 1991.

== Track listing ==
1. "The Sunny Side of the Street" (Shane MacGowan, Jem Finer)
2. "If I Should Fall From Grace With God" (MacGowan)
3. "Lorelei" (Phil Chevron)
4. "Thousands Are Sailing" (Chevron)
5. "White City" (MacGowan)
6. "Fairytale of New York" (MacGowan, Finer)
7. "Fiesta" (MacGowan, Finer, Kotscher, Lindt)
8. "Rain Street" (MacGowan)
9. "Turkish Song of the Damned" (MacGowan, Finer)
10. "Summer in Siam" (MacGowan)
11. "Misty Morning, Albert Bridge" (Finer)
12. "Blue Heaven" (MacGowan, Hunt)
13. "Honky Tonk Woman" (Jagger, Richards)
14. "Yeah, Yeah, Yeah, Yeah, Yeah (Long Version)" (MacGowan)

== Personnel ==
- Shane MacGowan - lead vocals, guitar
- Terry Woods - cittern, vocals
- Philip Chevron - guitar, vocals
- Spider Stacy - tin whistle, vocals
- Andrew Ranken - drums
- Jem Finer - banjo, saxophone
- Darryl Hunt - bass guitar
- Kirsty MacColl - vocals on "Fairytale of New York"
- James Fearnley - accordion

=== Other musicians ===
- Cait O'Riordan - bass, vocals
- Siobhan Sheahan - harp on "Fairytale of New York"
- Henry Benagh - fiddle
- Elvis Costello - acoustic guitar
- Brian Clarke - alto saxophone on "Fiesta"
- Joe Cashman - tenor saxophone on "Fiesta"
- Eli Thompson - trumpet on "Fiesta"
- Chris Lee - trumpet
- Paul Taylor - trombone
- Ron Kavana - tenor banjo, mandolin on "Thousands Are Sailing"

== Notes ==
- Tracks produced by Steve Lillywhite except tracks 1, 8, and 10 - Joe Strummer
