= Waiting for Herb =

Studio album by the Pogues
- Released: 19 October 1993
- Studios: Elephant Studios, Wapping, London; Harrovian Studios
- Genre: Celtic rock
- Length: 46:07
- Labels: WEA; Chameleon
- Producer: Michael Brook

The Pogues chronology
Essential Pogues (1991)	Waiting for Herb (1993)	Pogue Mahone (1996)

Singles from Waiting for Herb
- 1. "Tuesday Morning" Released: 1993; 2. "Once Upon a Time" Released: 1993

Professional ratings
Review scores
Source	Rating
Allmusic	2/5 stars

Waiting for Herb is the sixth studio album by the Pogues, released in 1993, and their first without lead singer Shane MacGowan.

== Overview ==
The album saw the band continue to expand their musical reach past the traditional Irish roots on which it had been founded, and was only the group's second full-length album without a single traditional song. The album featured the track "Tuesday Morning", which was the band's first Top Twenty hit since "Fairytale of New York."

With MacGowan departed, his singing and songwriting duties fell to the other members. While Spider Stacy took the role of lead vocalist, much of the songwriting fell to Jem Finer, who along with Terry Woods had previously been the most prolific songwriter apart from MacGowan. However, the album saw contributions by other members who had not written songs for the band previously, including James Fearnley, Andrew Ranken, and Darryl Hunt. Ranken also sang lead vocals on "My Baby's Gone".

The song "Smell of Petroleum", with its refrain "The secret of the universe is hidden in this song", references the following anecdote from Bertrand Russell's A History of Western Philosophy:

William James describes a man who got the experience from laughing-gas; whenever he was under its influence, he knew the secret of the universe, but when he came to, he had forgotten it. At last, with immense effort, he wrote down the secret before the vision had faded. When completely recovered, he rushed to see what he had written. It was: "A smell of petroleum prevails throughout."

It was the last Pogues album to feature Terry Woods, James Fearnley and Philip Chevron, all of whom left the group after the album's release.

== Track listing ==
=== Standard edition ===
1. "Tuesday Morning" (Spider Stacy) – 3:30
2. "Smell of Petroleum" (Jem Finer) – 3:13
3. "Haunting" (Terry Woods) – 4:04
4. "Once Upon a Time" (Finer) – 3:55
5. "Sitting on Top of the World" (Finer, James Fearnley, Woods) – 3:37
6. "Drunken Boat" (Fearnley) – 6:38
7. "Big City" (Darryl Hunt) – 2:41
8. "Girl from the Wadi Hammamat" (Finer, Andrew Ranken) – 4:53
9. "Modern World" (Hunt) – 3:55
10. "Pachinko" (Finer) – 3:09
11. "My Baby's Gone" (Finer, Ranken) – 2:24
12. "Small Hours" (Finer) – 4:31

=== Bonus tracks (2004 reissue) ===
13. "First Day of Forever" (Philip Chevron) – 3:20 (B-side to "Tuesday Morning")
14. "Train Kept Rolling On" (Ranken) – 3:18 (B-side to "Once Upon a Time")
15. "Paris St. Germain" (Stacy, Woods) – 3:07 (B-side to "Once Upon a Time")

== Personnel ==
Credits are adapted from the album liner notes.

The Pogues

- Spider Stacy – lead vocals (tracks 1, 2, 4–7, 9, 10, 12), co-lead vocals (track 8)
- Jem Finer – banjo (tracks 1, 3, 5, 7, 10, 11), guitar (tracks 2, 4, 12), soprano saxophone (tracks 6, 8), backing vocals (track 6), hurdy-gurdy (tracks 9, 12), pachinko (track 10)
- Terry Woods – mandolin (tracks 1–7, 9, 10), banjo (tracks 2, 12), bouzouki (tracks 3, 5, 8), cittern (tracks 3, 8, 11), concertina (track 3), lead vocals (track 3)
- Philip Chevron – guitar; backing vocals (track 1)
- James Fearnley – accordion (tracks 1–9, 11, 12), guitar (tracks 1), clarinet (tracks 6, 9), piano (track 6), mouth percussion (track 6), Hammond organ (track 8), hammered dulcimer (track 8), banjo (track 10)
- Darryl Hunt – bass; backing vocals (tracks 1, 2, 4–7, 9, 10), co-lead vocals (track 8), Roland 303 synthesizer (track 9)
- Andrew Ranken – drums (tracks 1–3, 5–12), backing vocals (tracks 6), co-lead vocals (track 8), lead vocals (track 11)

Additional musicians

- Michael Brook – "infinite" guitar; keyboards on "Girl from the Wadi Hammamat"
- David Coulter – percussion; foghorn on "Drunken Boat", ukulele on "Small Hours"
- Alastair Gavin – programming on "Tuesday Morning", "Haunting" and "Small Hours"
- Sarah Stanton – backing vocals on "Smell of Petroleum"
- Debsey Wykes – backing vocals on "Small Hours"
- James Pinker – percussion on "Girl from the Wadi Hammamat"
- Hijaz Mustapha – strings on "Girl from the Wadi Hammamat"
- Johnnie Fingers – Tokyo pachinko parlor recording on "Pachinko"

Technical

- Michael Brook – producer, engineer, mixing
- Richard Evans – engineer, mixing
- Nick Robbins – engineer
- Russell Kearney – assistant engineer
- Tony Cousins – mastering
- Ryan Art – design
- Steve Pyke – photography (band portraits)
- front cover photograph "The Chief" courtesy of Bailey's African Photo Archives
