= If I Should Fall from Grace with God =

1988 studio album by the Pogues

Studio album by The Pogues
- Released: 18 January 1988
- Recorded: 1987
- Studios: RAK Studios, London; The Town House, London (strings)
- Genres: Celtic punk; folk punk; Celtic rock; folk rock
- Length: 51:43
- Labels: Pogue Mahone/Warner Music Group (UK and Europe); Island (US and Canada)
- Producer: Steve Lillywhite

The Pogues chronology
Poguetry in Motion (1986)	If I Should Fall from Grace with God (1988)	Peace and Love (1989)

Alternative cover
- Original 1988 US & Canada album cover

Singles from If I Should Fall from Grace with God
- 1. "Fairytale of New York" Released: 23 November 1987; 2. "If I Should Fall from Grace with God" Released: 22 February 1988; 3. "Fiesta" Released: 4 July 1988

If I Should Fall from Grace with God is the third studio album by Celtic folk-punk band the Pogues, released on 18 January 1988. Released in the wake of their biggest hit single, "Fairytale of New York", If I Should Fall from Grace with God also became the band's best-selling album, peaking at number three on the UK Albums Chart and reaching the top ten in several other countries.

If I Should Fall from Grace with God saw the arrival of three new members: bassist Darryl Hunt replaced Cait O'Riordan, while Philip Chevron joined on guitar and Terry Woods played cittern and other instruments. Woods and Chevron (the only two members of The Pogues actually born in Ireland) contributed the first original songs to a Pogues album not written by singer Shane MacGowan or banjo player Jem Finer, and the album also saw the band begin to move away from their Irish folk/punk roots and start to incorporate musical styles from other parts of the world, most notably Turkey and Spain. Many of the songs' lyrics return to familiar themes in Pogues songs such as those moving out of Ireland or returning to the nation, but also touch on new themes such as political issues and family relationships.

Critically acclaimed, If I Should Fall from Grace with God marked the high point of the band's commercial success. Finer called the record "a very cohesive album that drew on a lot of styles. Everything came together and it was very focused. That [album is] really the creative peak for me, in terms of the whole band being on a wavelength."

== Background ==
The Pogues had received acclaim for their previous album Rum Sodomy & the Lash, released in August 1985, and had begun 1986 on a high note as they embarked upon a successful tour of the US, their first in that country, and released the Poguetry in Motion EP which became their first top 40 hit in the UK. However, the relationship with their producer Elvis Costello was deteriorating, and tensions were further heightened by his romantic involvement with the band's bass player Cait O'Riordan. The group parted ways with Costello, and after increasingly erratic behaviour which included not turning up to play shows, O'Riordan also left the band in October 1986. During this period The Pogues' record label Stiff Records went into administration: as the label still owned the rights to all Pogues recordings, the group were unable to record any new material until they were released from their contract with Stiff. During 1986, the group occupied themselves by guesting on a cover version of "The Irish Rover" with the Dubliners, and taking part in Alex Cox's comedy action film Straight to Hell, shot in southern Spain and also starring the Clash's frontman Joe Strummer.

The situation with Stiff was resolved in early 1987 and The Pogues were finally free to begin recording a new album. After recording some demos in Abbey Road Studios in March, the group entered London's RAK Studios on 9 May 1987 to begin work properly on their delayed third album. The band had chosen Darryl Hunt, a former bandmate of O'Riordan in Pride of the Cross, as her replacement on bass, and multi-instrumentalist Terry Woods (ex-Steeleye Span) was also brought in to add his expertise on a range of instruments. Phil Chevron, who had deputised for Jem Finer on banjo on a previous Pogues tour while Finer had taken a break to be with his wife and new-born child, was recruited full-time to the band as its permanent guitarist after frontman Shane MacGowan had decided he wanted to concentrate solely on singing in live performance.

The group had decided to use Steve Lillywhite to produce their new record. Finer later said, "I think it was as exciting for him as it was for us because he'd never worked with a band live in the studio".

== Composition and writing ==
The title for "Turkish Song of the Damned" actually came first and inspired the song's storyline and the music's Middle Eastern influence, rather than the other way round, as Chevron revealed to the NME: "We were in Germany and this magazine had an article about The Damned – the B-side of one of their singles is called 'The Turkey Song' [the B-side of their 1979 single "I Just Can't Be Happy Today"] but the mag called it 'The Turkish Song of the Damned' – it was too good a title to overlook". MacGowan explained the lyrics as being a mixture of pirate and ghost story "about a guy on a Turkish island who deserted a sinking ship with all the money and all his mates went down – I'm not totally sure about this – he's haunted and he's dancing around with all this Turkish music in his brain ... Then his best mate comes back, and all the crew, to drag him back down to hell or wherever they are." The song ends with a rendition of the traditional Irish jig "The Lark in the Morning".

"Bottle of Smoke" is the story of an imaginary horse of that name that goes on to win the Cheltenham Gold Cup, winning the song's narrator a large sum of money after he bets on the horse at long odds. MacGowan called it "the sort of weird impossible name that always wins a race".

"Fairytale of New York" remains The Pogues' best-known and best-selling single. It was named after J.P. Donleavy's 1973 novel A Fairy Tale of New York which Finer had been reading in the studio when the song was first written. The song dated back to 1985 when Finer had written the original melody and lyrics, about a sailor looking out over the ocean, but he admitted that his lyrics had been terrible and MacGowan had come up with a better storyline of a couple arguing in New York City at Christmas time. MacGowan had always intended the song to be sung as a duet, originally with O'Riordan providing the female vocal part, but despite attempts to record "Fairytale of New York" in January 1986 during the sessions for Poguetry in Motion, the band were unhappy with the results and abandoned the song. During the sessions for the third album at RAK in May 1987, MacGowan recorded new guide vocals for the song but with O'Riordan's departure it now had no female vocalist. Lillywhite took the tapes home and recorded his singer-songwriter wife Kirsty MacColl singing the female lines: when he brought them back to the studio The Pogues were so impressed that the song was re-recorded with MacColl as the replacement singing partner for MacGowan. "Fairytale of New York" was released as the album's lead single in November 1987 in the run-up to Christmas and reached number one in Ireland and number two in the UK. Its enduring popularity has seen it re-enter the charts several times since 1987, eventually going on to sell over a million copies in the UK and being voted the most popular Christmas-themed song of all time.

Despite never being released as a single, the track "Thousands Are Sailing" has since become one of The Pogues' most popular songs, and according to The Irish Times, it is "recognised as one of the finest songs about Irish emigration". It was written by the band's new guitarist Chevron, and although he had written many songs before as the frontman of his previous band the Radiators, he admitted that for a long time he had felt unsure about putting his song forward for consideration as MacGowan was the recognised songwriter in the band. It was only when Terry Woods offered to help him out with the track and MacGowan showed his approval of the song that Chevron gained the confidence to complete it. Featuring what has been described as a "heartfelt lyric, soaring tune and compelling chorus on the theme of emigration from Ireland to America", "Thousands Are Sailing" inspired the 2012 Derek McCullough graphic novel Gone to Amerikay. Although Chevron also contributed other songs to later Pogues albums, "Thousands Are Sailing" remains his most popular composition, and it was played at his funeral when he died of cancer in October 2013.

"Fiesta" was inspired by a riotous party, which lasted for several days, that the band had during their stay in southern Spain while filming Straight to Hell. Finer based the melody of the song on a fairground-style tune played by fast-food stalls which the band kept hearing everywhere in Spain, and which Finer said he found it impossible to get out of his head. The chorus of "Fiesta" also contains elements of "Liechtensteiner Polka", written by Edmund Kötscher and Rudi Lindt, and on later Pogues compilation albums they are given co-writing credits. "Fiesta" includes a verse in Spanish which adapts four lines from Federico Lorca's poem and changes the name of the character to "Jaime Fearnley", the Spanish version of the name of the Pogues' accordion player James Fearnley. The verse also namechecks Elvis Costello (described as el rey de America, a reference to his 1986 album King of America) and Cait O'Riordan. The date at the start of the verse changes Lorca's original date of 25 June to 25 August, which happens to be Costello's birthday.

The song "Streets of Sorrow"/"Birmingham Six" is the album's most explicitly political commentary. The first half is a ballad composed and sung by Woods about the life of Irish independence leader Michael Collins. It was originally a much longer standalone song, but the band felt it would work better as a shorter introduction to MacGowan's more uptempo second half of the song, which is about the Birmingham Six and the Guildford Four, two groups of Irish people imprisoned in the UK for terrorism offences. Their sentences were later found to be unsafe, and the Guildford Four had their convictions quashed and were released in 1989, followed by the Birmingham Six in 1991. The song also makes a passing reference to the Loughgall Martyrs, with the line "while over in Ireland eight more men lay dead, kicked down and shot in the back of the head". MacGowan reflected, "It's about anybody in that situation, getting locked away without any real evidence ... Basically it's a prison song about someone pacing round his cell or round the yard wondering what the fuck it's all about ... It's a depressing song – it's not a song that I enjoyed writing or find much pleasure in singing."

MacGowan described "Lullaby of London" as being about a man who comes home at night drunk and proceeds to start telling his young son, who is in bed, about how everything is going to be fine and to go to sleep, while privately the man is worried and hoping that the child will not have to go through the same hardships that he did while growing up.

"Sit Down by the Fire" is about "the old ghost stories people used to tell you in Ireland before you went to bed. They used to tell you some horrific stories to prepare you for the horrors of the world ahead."

"The Broad Majestic Shannon" is named after the longest river in Ireland and, according to MacGowan, is a song about an Irishman returning to his home town in County Tipperary after many years of living in London, and finding that everything about the place he grew up in has changed or disappeared. MacGowan revealed that he had written the song with former Clancy Brothers members Liam Clancy and Tommy Makem in mind, in the hope that they would record a version of it.

== Release ==
The compact disc version of If I Should Fall from Grace with God contained two extra tracks not included on the vinyl LP or cassette versions: a cover of the traditional song "South Australia" and the instrumental "The Battle March Medley".

The alternative album cover, issued in the United States and Canada, is a collage of faked photos of the group's members standing in a line, in which each of their faces have been superimposed onto a shot of Irish author James Joyce. The original unedited picture of Joyce appears fourth from the left in the line.

== Critical reception ==
Professional ratings
Review scores
Source	Rating
AllMusic	4.5/5 stars
The Irish Times	5/5 stars
Mojo	5/5 stars
NME	10/10
Q	4/5 stars
Record Mirror	5/5
Rolling Stone	4/5 stars
Sounds	5/5 stars
Uncut	4/5 stars
The Village Voice	B+

If I Should Fall from Grace with God was well received by critics. In the UK the NME lauded the record; Terry Staunton's review for the magazine stated, "If I Should Fall from Grace with God sees The Pogues venturing towards the area occupied by the latter day Madness, troubled words on top of happy tunes, stormclouds casting shadows across forced smiles ... With their new LP, The Pogues have given us a thing of beauty, the bleakest of masterpieces which will find few equals in 1988." Neil Perry of Sounds wrote that "within the grooves of Grace, the third Pogues LP, you get heaven and hell and everything in between. If you've ever viewed The Pogues as a quaint rabble-rousing cult band then think again, for this is a record of rare quality and seductive charm." In Q, David Sinclair described the album as "old-style Pogues, as dependably garrulous and irreverent as ever, but the album also advances on new fronts with a gleeful sense of adventure". Record Mirror's Eleanor Levy said that the band had added "depth to their 'Irish Rover' charm" and produced "quite simply, the most lively, enjoyable 'good time' album you will have heard this, or any, year." Melody Maker was the only UK music paper to give the album a negative appraisal, with reviewer David Stubbs being fiercely critical of the idea that traditional Irish music should be mixed with rock music, before saying, "so far removed is this album from my constituency that I feel scarcely qualified to review it at all". (Note: Stubbs later admitted on his personal website that he had always hated the Pogues, and had written his review without listening to the album at all.)

The reaction from US critics was also very positive. Kurt Loder wrote in Rolling Stone that "obviously the Pogues can do it all. And it sounds as if they've only just begun." Michael Corcoran of Spin stated that "it's got guts and soul, and will make poor people dance until 4 a.m., even if they have to be at work until 7 a.m." and that despite containing a few songs that could be skipped over, "this LP on cassette will cause more wear on the rewind button than on the fast forward". The Village Voice critic Robert Christgau said that "neither pop nor rock nor disco crossover stays these groghounds from the swift accomplishment of their appointed rounds".

Reviewing the 2004 reissue, Mojo's Pat Gilbert called If I Should Fall from Grace with God "an amazingly original, democratically written and ethnically adventurous album". AllMusic reviewer Mark Deming considered it "the best album the Pogues would ever make".

In 2006, Q placed If I Should Fall from Grace with God at number 37 on its list of the "40 Best Albums of the '80s". The record was also included in the book 1001 Albums You Must Hear Before You Die, and was ranked number 975 in the 2000 edition of the book All Time Top 1000 Albums.

== Track listing ==
=== Original release ===
No.	Title	Writer(s)	Length
1.	"If I Should Fall from Grace with God"	Shane MacGowan	2:20
2.	"Turkish Song of the Damned"	MacGowan, Jem Finer	3:27
3.	"Bottle of Smoke"	MacGowan, Finer	2:47
4.	"Fairytale of New York"	MacGowan, Finer	4:36
5.	"Metropolis"	Finer	2:50
6.	"Thousands Are Sailing"	Phil Chevron	5:28
7.	"South Australia"	Traditional, arranged by The Pogues	3:27
8.	"Fiesta"	MacGowan, Finer	4:13
9.	"Medley: The Recruiting Sergeant/The Rocky Road to Dublin/The Galway Races"	Traditional, arranged by The Pogues	4:03
10.	"Streets of Sorrow/Birmingham Six"	Terry Woods/MacGowan	4:39
11.	"Lullaby of London"	MacGowan	3:32
12.	"The Battle March Medley"	Woods	4:10
13.	"Sit Down by the Fire"	MacGowan	2:18
14.	"The Broad Majestic Shannon"	MacGowan	2:55
15.	"Worms"	Traditional, arranged by James Fearnley, Andrew Ranken	1:01

- Tracks 7 and 12 are CD bonus tracks, not on vinyl, LP, or cassette editions

=== 2004 reissue ===
No.	Title	Writer(s)	Length
1.	"If I Should Fall from Grace with God"	MacGowan	2:20
2.	"Turkish Song of the Damned"	MacGowan, Finer	3:27
3.	"Bottle of Smoke"	MacGowan, Finer	2:47
4.	"Fairytale of New York"	MacGowan, Finer	4:36
5.	"Metropolis"	Finer	2:50
6.	"Thousands Are Sailing"	Chevron	5:28
7.	"Fiesta"	MacGowan, Finer	4:13
8.	"Medley: The Recruiting Sergeant/The Rocky Road to Dublin/The Galway Races"	Traditional	4:03
9.	"Streets of Sorrow/Birmingham Six"	MacGowan, Woods	4:39
10.	"Lullaby of London"	MacGowan	3:32
11.	"Sit Down by the Fire"	MacGowan	2:18
12.	"The Broad Majestic Shannon"	MacGowan	2:55
13.	"Worms"	Traditional	1:01

Bonus tracks
No.	Title	Writer(s)	Length
14.	"The Battle March (Medley)" (B-side of "Fairytale of New York", 1987)	Woods	4:10
15.	"The Irish Rover" (A-side single, 1987; with The Dubliners)	Joseph Crofts/Traditional	4:08
16.	"Mountain Dew" (B-side of "The Irish Rover"; with The Dubliners)	Traditional	2:15
17.	"Shanne Bradley" (B-side of "Fairytale of New York")	MacGowan	3:42
18.	"Sketches of Spain" (B-side of "Fiesta", 1988)	Finer	2:14
19.	"South Australia" (B-side of "Fiesta")	Traditional	3:27

== Personnel ==
Credits are adapted from the album liner notes, except where noted.

The Pogues

- Shane MacGowan – vocals, guitar
- Spider Stacy – tin whistle, vocals
- James Fearnley – accordion, piano, mandolin, dulcimer, guitar, cello, percussion, string arrangements
- Jem Finer – banjo, saxophone
- Andrew Ranken – drums, vocals
- Philip Chevron – guitar, mandolin, vocals
- Darryl Hunt – bass, percussion, vocals
- Terry Woods – cittern lute, concertina, strings, banjo, dulcimer, guitar, vocals

Additional personnel

- Ron Kavana – banjo, spoons, mandolin
- Kirsty MacColl – vocals on "Fairytale of New York"
- Siobhan Sheahan – harp
- Brian Clarke – alto saxophone
- Joe Cashman – tenor saxophone
- Paul Taylor – trombone
- Chris Lee – trumpet
- Eli Thompson – trumpet
- Fiachra Trench – string arrangements
- The Pogues Choir (The Pogues, the man from the Indian take-away, Brian Sheridan from the off-licence, John Lawlor, Ron Kavana, Joe Cashman, Paul Verner, Steve Lillywhite, Paul Scully, Frank Murray) – backing vocals

Technical personnel

- Steve Lillywhite – producer, engineer
- Chris Dickie – engineer
- Nick Lacey – engineer
- Roy Spong – engineer
- Iain McKell – photography
- Michael Mann Studios – montage retouching
- Eamonn Campbell – producer on "The Irish Rover" and "Mountain Dew"
- Harold Burgon – engineer on "The Irish Rover" and "Mountain Dew"
- Paul Scully – engineer on "The Irish Rover" and "Mountain Dew"
- Dave Jordan – engineer on "The Irish Rover" and "Mountain Dew"

== Charts ==
Chart (1988)	Peak position
Australian Albums (Kent Music Report)	36
Canada Top Albums/CDs (RPM)	20
Dutch Albums (Album Top 100)	52
New Zealand Albums (RMNZ)	4
Norwegian Albums (VG-lista)	15
Swedish Albums (Sverigetopplistan)	9
Swiss Albums (Schweizer Hitparade)	9
UK Albums (Official Charts)	3

== Certifications and sales ==
Region	Certification	Certified units/sales
Canada (Music Canada)	Gold	50,000^{^}
France (SNEP)	Gold	100,000^{*}
United Kingdom (BPI)	Gold	100,000^{^}
^{*} Sales figures based on certification alone.^{^} Shipments figures based on certification alone.

== Release history ==
Region	Date	Label	Format	Catalog
United Kingdom	18 January 1988	Pogue Mahone	LP	NYR 1
United Kingdom	18 January 1988	Pogue Mahone	cassette	TCNYR 1
United Kingdom	18 January 1988	Pogue Mahone	CD	CDNYR 1
United States	1988	Island	LP	90872-1
United States	1988	Island	cassette	90872-4
United States	1988	Island	CD	90872-2
Canada	1988	Island	LP	ISL 1175
Canada	1988	Island	cassette	ISLC 1175
Canada	1988	Island	CD	CIDM 1175
Worldwide	1994	Pogue Mahone/Warner Music Group	LP	2292-44493-1
Worldwide	1994	Pogue Mahone/Warner Music Group	cassette	2292-44493-4
Worldwide	1994	Pogue Mahone/Warner Music Group	CD	2292-44493-2
Worldwide	13 December 2004	Warner Strategic Marketing	CD	5046759602
United States	19 September 2006	Rhino	CD	R2 74069
