= Ghostown (The Radiators album) =

- Original 1979 cover

Studio album by the Radiators
- Released: 10 August 1979
- Recorded: 1978
- Studios: Good Earth Soundhouse, London
- Genres: Punk, new wave
- Length: 35:25
- Label: Chiswick
- Producer: Tony Visconti

The Radiators chronology
TV Tube Heart (as The Radiators from Space) (1977)	Ghostown (1979)	Trouble Pilgrim (2006)

Singles from Ghostown
- 1. "Million Dollar Hero (In a Five and Ten Cents Store)" Released: 28 April 1978; 2. "Let's Talk About the Weather" Released: 23 June 1979; 3. "Kitty Rickets" Released: 31 August 1979; 4. "Under Clery's Clock (single for 1989 re-release of album)" Released: 30 January 1989

Professional ratings
Review scores
Source	Rating
AllMusic	link
Irish Times	(very favourable)

Ghostown is a 1979 album by Irish punk/new wave band the Radiators.

The Radiators recorded two albums in the group's original incarnation, of which Ghostown is the second. Their first album (as The Radiators from Space) was TV Tube Heart (1977). Their next album Trouble Pilgrim, produced after a reunion, would only be released in 2006.

== Reception ==
Ghostown is something of a concept album, documenting the sense of social and cultural isolation felt by many Dubliners throughout the 1970s, sometimes noted as literary and "difficult", especially for a snappy record from a punk band.

The best-known song from the album is probably "Song of the Faithful Departed", written by Philip Chevron, which was originally released as a B-Side but is the Radiator's song that tends to appear on overview collections such as 101 Irish Hits (from IrishMusicMail.com) or compilations that hope to be critically representative such as Dave Fanning's Fab 50.

In 2008 The Irish Times named Ghostown the third best Irish album of all time (jointly with I Am the Greatest by A House), behind Loveless by My Bloody Valentine and Achtung Baby by U2.

At the time of its release the record had also received rave reviews. The ambition and literacy of Ghostown may have, however, impacted on its popularity on the charts (although "Million Dollar Hero" was a "near hit") and when performed live, effects amplified by its release having been delayed by about a year into 1979. Thus, the entry for Philip Chevron on The Pogues website ruefully notes that despite Ghostown's positive critical reception, "unfortunately the reviews were too late, and shortly after the release the group broke up".

Ghostown turned out not to be the final album of The Radiators. In the 2000s, mainstays Chevron and Holidai reformed the band with original founding member Steve Rapid, and new members replacing Crashe and Megary with, Johnny Bonnie, and Jesse Booth; Cait O'Riordan was also involved for a time. This line up has since released some EPs and the album Trouble Pilgrim.

== Personnel ==
For Ghostown the nom de guerre of The Radiators from Space was shortened to The Radiators. The personnel of "The Radiators" on Ghostown was as follows:

- Philip Chevron - guitar, synthesizer, vocals
- Mark Megaray - bass, keyboards, vocals
- Jimmy Crashe - drums, vocals
- Pete Holidai - vocals, guitar

with:

- Ruan O'Lochlainn - saxophone on "Million Dollar Hero", "Let's Talk About the Weather", "They're Looting in the Town" and "Song of the Faithful Departed"
- Tony Visconti - string arrangements on "They're Looting in the Town", "Walking Home Alone Again" and "Dead the Beast, Dead the Poison", piano on "Confidential", electric piano and synthesizer on "Who Are the Strangers?", mandolin on "Ballad of Kitty Ricketts", Hammond organ on "Song of the Faithful Departed"
- Mary Hopkin - Hollywood choir on "Walking Home Alone Again"

The same line-up recorded the two tracks for the 1989 reissue.

Main songwriting duties were shared by Holidai and Chevron, but every member of the band contributed song writing to the album.

The shortened version of the name seems to represent the fact that founding member Steve Rapid had left the band after TV Tube Heart so that The Radiators were now a four-piece, with Chevron taking responsibility for lead vocals on Ghostown. The band had also moved to London, partly because they suffered fall-out following the death of an audience member at a punk festival they had organised in Dublin, so the different name for this record might represent an attempt to escape that memory.

== Production ==
The Ghostown recording sessions in London were overseen and produced by Tony Visconti. Visconti also provides piano, synthesizer, organ, mandolin and string arrangements.. Ruan O'Lochlainn contributes saxophone on many of the tracks. John Ryan and Mary Hopkin are the other guest musicians.

The two tracks for the 1989 reissue were produced by Pete Holidai and Phil Chevron

== Cover ==
The cover of Ghostown is based on a still from F.W. Murnau's 1922 film Nosferatu. A different cover would be used for the 1989 re-release of the record (a photo of the band silhouetted against the bright waters of a docklands scene), with the original again restored for later re-releases.

== Track listing ==
Ghostown was released by Chiswick Records on 10 August 1979 (catalogue number CWK 3003). A re-released tenth anniversary version from 1989 (catalogue WIK 85) added two extra tracks and rearranged the track order; some songs on this release have slightly shorter names (the album cover is also different). A 2005 reissue (catalogue CDWIKM 292) restored the original track listing (and cover). A 40th anniversary edition released by Ace Records in 2019 (catalogue CDTOP2 343) included 35 bonus tracks of outtakes, alternate mixes, single versions, live tracks and more.

All tracks produced by Tony Visconti except as noted.

=== Track listing ===
1. "Million Dollar Hero" (Pete Holidai) - 3:06
2. "Let's Talk About the Weather" (Pete Holidai, Philip Chevron) - 4:19
3. "Johnny Jukebox" (Philip Chevron) - 2:46
4. "Confidential" (Pete Holidai, Philip Chevron) - 2:51
5. "They're Looting in the Town" (Pete Holidai, Philip Chevron) - 4:01
6. "Who Are the Strangers?" (Pete Holidai) - 3:13
7. "Ballad of Kitty Ricketts" (Philip Chevron) - 3:55
8. "Song of the Faithful Departed" (Philip Chevron) - 4:44
9. "Walking Home Alone Again" (Jimmy Crashe, Philip Chevron) - 3:05
10. "Dead the Beast, Dead the Poison" (Jimmy Crashe, Mark Megaray, Philip Chevron) - 3:25

=== 1989 version ===
1. "Johnny Jukebox"
2. "Million Dollar Hero"
3. "They're Looting in the Town"
4. "Under Clery's Clock" (Chevron) (produced by Holidai, Chevron)
5. "Confidential"
6. "Faithful Departed"
7. "Let's Talk About the Weather"
8. "Who Are the Strangers?"
9. "Kitty Ricketts"
10. "Plura Belle" (Chevron) (produced by Holidai, Chevron)
11. "Walking Home Alone Again"
12. "Dead the Beast, Dead the Poison"
- "Under Clery's Clock" is a Chevron song which first appeared as part of a one-off concert and live mini-album in support of an AIDS charity (Dollar for Your Dreams: The Radiators Live!) in 1987.
