= Poguetry in Motion =

EP by The Pogues
- Released: 24 February 1986
- Recorded: 20 December 1985
- Studio: Elephant Studios, London; Sarm West Studios, London; AIR Studios, London
- Genre: Celtic rock
- Length: 16:42
- Label: Stiff (UK & Europe); MCA (US & Canada)
- Producer: Elvis Costello

The Pogues chronology
Rum Sodomy & the Lash (1985)	Poguetry in Motion (1986)	If I Should Fall from Grace with God (1988)

Professional ratings
Review scores
Source	Rating
Robert Christgau	A−

Poguetry in Motion is an EP by the Pogues, released on Stiff Records in the UK on 24 February 1986, and in the US & Canada on MCA Records. It was the band's first single to make the UK Top 40, peaking at number 29 and the first Pogues recording to feature Philip Chevron and Terry Woods.

== Overview ==
Poguetry in Motion features the songs "London Girl", "Rainy Night in Soho", "The Body of an American" and "Planxty Noel Hill". The songs were recorded with producer Elvis Costello in August 1985, in the same sessions that produced the first versions of "Fairytale of New York" (with bass player Cait O'Riordan singing the female part of the duet) and a cover version of The Lovin' Spoonful's song "Do You Believe In Magic". Both tracks were intended to feature on the EP, but were eventually left off it. The tracks were later issued on Just Look Them Straight in the Eye and Say... POGUE MAHONE!!

"Planxty Noel Hill" refers to Noel Hill, a renowned traditional Irish musician who, at the time of the release of the band's second album, Rum Sodomy and the Lash, claimed that The Pogues were disrespecting the whole Irish music tradition. Planxty has come to mean something akin to "cheers", though its use in the song's title is insincere. On the first Pogues tour of Ireland, some members of the band participated along with Hill in a panel discussion on Irish radio, during the course of which Hill described the music of The Pogues as a "terrible abortion" (the incident is described in and the quote is taken from "The Lost Decade"). The confrontation occurred during the course of a studio debate on RTÉ Radio hosted by BP Fallon.

The song "Body of an American" was featured prominently on the TV series The Wire during police officer wakes. The Pogues also played this song as their second song on the 1990 St. Patrick's Day episode of Saturday Night Live. A cigarette-smoking MacGowan, appearing quite inebriated, finished the song smoking and drinking while sitting on the drum riser during the extended live instrumental outro.

The EP was originally released only on cassette and vinyl in both 7" and 12" formats, except in Canada where it was also released on compact disc. The 7" played at 33⅓ rpm and the 12" at 45 rpm, although both contained the same tracks. The EP was re-issued, including on CD, in 1991. The EP's tracks were not originally featured on any Pogues album but are included as bonus tracks on the 2004 re-issue of Rum, Sodomy, and the Lash. Several of the tracks have appeared on various "best of" and other compilation albums.

An alternate version of "Rainy Night in Soho", a slightly longer mix featuring oboe instead of flugelhorn, was included on Canadian and US editions of the EP. During the recording of the EP, producer Elvis Costello and singer/songwriter Shane MacGowan had an argument over this, with MacGowan insisting on the flugelhorn version. The oboe version was re-issued on the 2008 boxset Just Look Them Straight in the Eye and Say....POGUE MAHONE!! A third mix released in 1991 is available and on the remastered Hell's Ditch album.

== Track listing ==
All songs written and composed by Shane MacGowan except where noted.

Side one

1. "London Girl" – 3:03
2. "A Rainy Night in Soho" – 5:35 (US & Canada mix featuring oboe is 5:47)

Side two

1. "The Body of an American" – 4:47
2. "Planxty Noel Hill" (Jem Finer) – 3:09

== Personnel ==
The Pogues

- Philip Chevron
- James Fearnley
- Jem Finer
- Cait O'Riordan
- Spider Stacy
- Terry Woods
- Andrew Ranken
- Shane MacGowan

with:

- Tommy Keane - uileann pipes
- Henry Benagh - fiddle
- Dick Cuthell - flugelhorn
- Fiachra Trench - string arrangements
