= 30 Years A-Greying =

Studio album by The Dubliners
- Released: 1992
- Genre: Irish folk
- Label: Celtic Collections
- Producer: Eamonn Campbell

The Dubliners chronology
Dubliner's Dublin (1988)	30 Years A-Greying (1992)	Original Dubliners (1993)

30 Years A-Greying is a double album by The Dubliners, again produced by Eamonn Campbell. 30 Years A-Greying is similar to 25 Years Celebration in that it also features a number of special guests. The Pogues featured again, this time on a version of "Whiskey In The Jar". Other special guests are Billy Connolly, De Dannan, Rory Gallagher and the Hothouse Flowers.

== Track listing ==
CD One:

1. "The Rose" (with Hothouse Flowers)
2. "Eileen Óg"
3. "Jigs – The Fisherman's Lilt/Tobin's Fancy/Peggy's Jig"
4. "The Death of the Bear"
5. "The Galway Shawl"
6. "Jockey to the Fair"
7. "The Pool Song"
8. "Barley and Grape Rag" (with Rory Gallagher)
9. "I'm Asking You Sergeant, Where's Mine" (with Billy Connolly)
10. "The Stone Outside Dan Murphy's Door"
11. "Flowers of Normandy"
12. "Phil the Fluter's Ball"
13. "Bantry Girl's Lament"
14. "Will the Circle Be Unbroken?"
15. "The Auld Triangle"

CD Two:

1. "Sands of Sudan"
2. "The Manchester Rambler"
3. "Drag That Fiddle"
4. "The Call and the Answer" (Phil Colclough)
5. "Boots of Spanish Leather" (with De Dannan)
6. "Hornpipes – The Tailor's Twist/Ryan's Hornpipe"
7. "I'll Tell Me Ma"
8. "Sweet Thames Flow Softly"
9. "Whiskey in the Jar" (with The Pogues)
10. "Deportees" (Woody Guthrie)
11. "Nora"
12. "Reels – Love at the Endings/The Old Bush/The Maids of Castlebar"
13. "Liverpool Lou" (Dominic Behan)
14. "What Will We Tell the Children"
15. "I'm a Man You Don't Meet Every Day"

== Chart performance ==
Chart (1992)	Peak position
Irish Albums (IRMA)	5
