= Tuesday Morning (disambiguation) =

Tuesday Morning is a defunct American discount store company.

Tuesday Morning may also refer to:

- "Tuesday Morning" (song), a 1993 song by The Pogues
- "Tuesday Morning", a song by Melissa Etheridge from Lucky
- "Tuesday Morning", a song by Michelle Branch from Hotel Paper
- Tuesday Morning Quarterback, a column written by Gregg Easterbrook
