= Liechtensteiner Polka =

Polka single

Single by Will Glahé and His Orchestra
- B-side: "Schweizer Kanton - Polka"
- Released: September 1957
- Genre: Polka
- Length: 2:20
- Label: London
- Songwriter(s): Edmund Kötscher, Rudi Lindt

Will Glahé and His Orchestra singles chronology
"Beer Barrel Polka" (1951)	"Liechtensteiner Polka" (1957)	"Tavern in the Town" (1958)

"Liechtensteiner Polka" is a song written by Edmund Kötscher and Rudi Lindt and performed by Will Glahé and His Orchestra. It reached #16 on the U.S. pop chart and #11 in Canada in 1957.

== Other charting versions ==
- Lawrence Welk and His Orchestra released a version of the song which reached #62 on the U.S. pop chart in 1957.

== Other versions ==
- The Big Ben Banjo Band released a version of the song sung in English as a single in the UK in 1957, but it did not chart.
- Li'l Wally released a version of the song as a single in 1957, but it did not chart.
- Horst Wende and His Polka Boys released a version of the song as a single in 1957, but it did not chart.
- Frankie Yankovic and His Yanks released a version of the song on their 1959 EP The All-Time Great Polkas Vol. 3.
- Bob Kames released a version of the song as the B-side to his 1960 single "Lili Marlene".
- The Pogues incorporated the piece in their song "Fiesta" on their 1988 album If I Should Fall From Grace With God.
- 101 Strings released a version of the song on their 1990 album Polka.
- The Mom and Dads released a version of the song on their 1995 album Love Is a Beautiful Song.
- Jimmy Sturr released a version of the song on the 1998 various artist album Legends of Polka.
- "Weird Al" Yankovic incorporated the song in his Polka Face medley.
