= Jock Stewart =

Jock Stewart may refer to:

- Jock Stewart (rugby union), Scottish international rugby union player
- Jock Stewart, traditional Irish or Scottish music hall song also known as I'm a Man You Don't Meet Every Day
- Jock Stewart, a fictional character from the Australian television series Prisoner, played by Tommy Dysart
- John Stewart (New Zealand politician) (1902–1973), also known as Jock Stewart, New Zealand politician
- Robert Leslie Stewart (1918–1989), also known as Jock Stewart, Scottish hangman
- William Stewart (cyclist) (1883–1950), also known as Jock Stewart, a British Olympic cyclist
