= Red Roses for Me =

Studio album by The Pogues
- Released: 15 October 1984
- Studios: Elephant Studios, Wapping, London
- Genres: Traditional Irish music; folk punk; post-punk
- Length: 40:12
- Label: Stiff
- Producer: Stan Brennan

The Pogues chronology
| Red Roses for Me (1984) | Rum Sodomy & the Lash (1985) |

Singles from Red Roses for Me
- 1. "Dark Streets of London" Released: June 1984; 2. "Boys from the County Hell" Released: 15 October 1984

Red Roses for Me is the debut studio album by the London-based band the Pogues, released on 15 October 1984. It was produced by Stan Brennan, who had managed the Nipple Erectors/The Nips and Rocks Off Records shop in London.

== Overview ==
Red Roses for Me is filled with traditional Irish music performed with punk influences. The Mancunion saw the "creativity of post-punk" as being "evident throughout the record", while Muso's Guide described much of Red Roses for Me as "a whirlwind of revved-up folk punk". The band's approach of mixing traditional songs and ballads with frontman Shane MacGowan's "gutter hymns" about drinking, fighting and sex was innovative at the time. The album reached number 89 in the UK album charts. The front of the album shows the band with the exception of drummer Andrew Ranken (pictured in inset) sitting in front of a picture of US President John F. Kennedy in the JFK Hall at the London Irish Centre in Camden. On the back cover, accordion player James Fearnley has a bottle sticking out of his coat, while bass player Cait O'Riordan is seen holding a can of beer. Shane MacGowan is pictured with his foot in a cast.

== Critical reception ==
Professional ratings
Review scores
| Source | Rating |
|---|---|
| AllMusic | 3.5/5 stars |
| Mojo | (2004 reissue) |
| Q | (2004 reissue) |
| Record Mirror | 5/5 stars |

The UK music press hailed the Pogues' début album as a breath of fresh air, with positive reviews. Melody Maker felt that "the quality of their music, even the very nature of it, is strangely irrelevant. What's important is their existence at all. For The Pogues are a gesture – a particularly bloody two-fingered one – aimed at all things considered current and fashionable in 1984... Theirs is a gut reaction to traditional music – and with it comes all the motion, intensity and vigour that has largely been lost to these songs since the early days of the folk revival in the Sixties." NME stated, "From the strummed banjo and lilting accordion that preface a roaring singalong 'Transmetropolitan' to the final unidentified voice offering an unaccompanied 'diddly I di di' refrain, there exists a wealth of evidence that Shane MacGowan's faith in the power of positive drinking-music has paid premiums. The raucous surge and evocative noise that has filled the capital's pubs and clubs has come through the stark sobriety of the studio set-up to arrive intact in all its sweat-soaked beer-stained glory... If you think they've rehabilitated a music that's been asleep for a while you're dead wrong – on both counts. The music has never been away, and The Pogues in all their irreverent 'seriousness' have taken it out on a limb, where it all started, where it belongs." Awarding the album 3¾ stars out of five, Sounds said, "Red Roses for Me is a satisfyingly impure, purposefully imperfect and totally irresistible collection of lasting resentment, rebellious roars, watery-eyed romance and uproarious jigs... Surprisingly, this record works. It manages to convey the sullied, brazen and raucous spirit of their live set very effectively." Robert Christgau gave the album a B+ and proclaimed "tepid it ain't".

=== Legacy ===
For the 1994 reissue of the album Q observed that the album "rushes along at an unholy amphetamine gallop... they sound utterly intoxicated both with their own enthusiasm and the spirit of the jig and the reel".

In a retrospective review for AllMusic, Mark Deming calls the album "good and rowdy fun", but feels that "on Rum Sodomy & the Lash and If I Should Fall from Grace with God, the Pogues would prove that they were capable of a lot more than that".

== Track listing ==
Standard edition
| No. | Title | Writer(s) | Length |
|---|---|---|---|
| 1. | "Transmetropolitan" | Shane MacGowan | 4:15 |
| 2. | "The Battle of Brisbane" | MacGowan | 1:49 |
| 3. | "The Auld Triangle" | Dick Shannon; credited on the album to Brendan Behan | 4:20 |
| 4. | "Waxie's Dargle" | Traditional; arranged by the Pogues | 1:53 |
| 5. | "Boys from the County Hell" | MacGowan | 2:56 |
| 6. | "Sea Shanty" | MacGowan | 2:24 |
| 7. | "Dark Streets of London" | MacGowan | 3:33 |
| 8. | "Streams of Whiskey" | MacGowan | 2:32 |
| 9. | "Poor Paddy" | Traditional; arranged by the Pogues | 3:09 |
| 10. | "Dingle Regatta" | Traditional; arranged by Jem Finer | 2:52 |
| 11. | "Greenland Whale Fisheries" | Traditional; arranged by the Pogues | 2:36 |
| 12. | "Down in the Ground Where the Dead Men Go" | MacGowan | 3:30 |
| 13. | "Kitty" | Traditional; arranged by the Pogues | 4:23 |

Bonus tracks (2004 reissue)

In 2004, a remastered CD was issued adding a total of 6 bonus tracks to the original UK album listing. "Repeal of the Licensing Laws" was the B-side of "The Boys from the County Hell" their second single. "And the Band Played Waltzing Matilda" was the B-side of their first single, "Dark Streets of London". "Whiskey You're the Devil" and "Mursheen Durkin" were the B-sides of their third single, "A Pair of Brown Eyes". "The Wild Rover" and "The Leaving of Liverpool" were the B-sides of their fourth single, "Sally Maclennane".

14. "The Leaving of Liverpool" (Traditional; arranged by the Pogues) produced by Elvis Costello
15. "Muirshin Durkin" (Traditional; arranged by the Pogues) produced by Philip Chevron
16. "Repeal of the Licensing Laws" (instrumental) (Spider Stacy) produced by Stan Brennan
17. "And the Band Played Waltzing Matilda" (Eric Bogle) produced by Stan Brennan
18. "Whiskey You're the Devil" (Traditional; arranged by the Pogues) produced by Philip Chevron
19. "The Wild Rover" (Traditional; arranged by the Pogues) produced by Elvis Costello

Bonus tracks (2024 reissue)

In 2024, a 40th anniversary edition was released, featuring a 2013 remix of the tracks on the original album, the bonus tracks from the 2004 release, and a further 12 tracks, all taken from sessions recorded for BBC radio.

20. "Streams of Whiskey" (John Peel Session – April 1984)
21. "Greenland Whale Fisheries" (John Peel Session – April 1984)
22. "Boys from the County Hell" (John Peel Session – April 1984)
23. "The Auld Triangle" (John Peel Session – April 1984)
24. "Dingle Regatta/Holly Johnsons" (David "Kid" Jensen Session – June 1984)
25. "Poor Paddy on the Railway" (David "Kid" Jensen Session – June 1984)
26. "Boys from the County Hell" (David "Kid" Jensen Session – June 1984)
27. "Connemara, Let's Go!" (David "Kid" Jensen Session – June 1984)
28. "Whiskey You're the Devil" (John Peel Session – December 1984)
29. "The Navigator" (John Peel Session – December 1984)
30. "Sally MacLennane" (John Peel Session – December 1984)
31. "Danny Boy" (John Peel Session – December 1984)

== Charts ==
| Chart (1984) | Peak position |
|---|---|
| UK Albums (Official Charts) | 89 |

== Certifications ==
| Region | Certification | Certified units/sales |
|---|---|---|
| United Kingdom (BPI) | Silver | 60,000^{^} |
^{^} Shipments figures based on certification alone.

== Personnel ==
The Pogues

- Shane MacGowan – vocals, guitar
- Country Jem Finer – banjo
- Spider Stacy – tin whistle, vocals
- Maestro Jimmy Fearnley – accordion
- Rocky O'Riordan – bass guitar
- Andy "The Clobberer" Ranken – drums, percussion

Additional personnel on bonus tracks

- Phil Chevron – piano, producer

Technical

- Stan Brennan – producer
- Nick Robbins – engineer
- Craig Thompson – engineer
- Steve Tynan – photography
