= Once Upon a Time (The Pogues song) =

Single by The Pogues

from the album Waiting for Herb
- Released: 1993
- Genre: Pop, Celtic rock
- Length: 3:55
- Label: WEA
- Songwriter: Jem Finer

The Pogues singles chronology
| "Tuesday Morning" (1993) | "Once Upon a Time" (1993) |

"Once Upon a Time" is a song by The Pogues released as a single in 1993 from their sixth album, Waiting for Herb. The song was the band's last single to chart in the UK, making number 66, before the band broke up in 1996 following the release of their seventh and final album, Pogue Mahone. The song was composed by Banjo player Jem Finer.
