= Fairytale of New York =

1987 single by the Pogues featuring Kirsty MacColl

Single by the Pogues featuring Kirsty MacColl

from the album If I Should Fall from Grace with God
- Released: 23 November 1987
- Recorded: August 1987
- Studio: RAK Studios, London
- Genre: Celtic rock; Celtic punk; Christmas
- Length: 4:33: 4:03 (video version)
- Label: Pogue Mahone
- Songwriters: Jem Finer, Shane MacGowan
- Producer: Steve Lillywhite

The Pogues singles chronology
"The Irish Rover" (1987)	"Fairytale of New York" (1987)	"If I Should Fall from Grace with God" (1988)

Kirsty MacColl singles chronology
"He's on the Beach" (1985)	"Fairytale of New York" (1987)	"Free World" (1989)

Music video
- "Fairytale of New York" on YouTube

Audio
- "Fairytale of New York" (full version) on YouTube

"Fairytale of New York" is a song written by Jem Finer and Shane MacGowan and recorded by their London-based band the Pogues, featuring English singer-songwriter Kirsty MacColl on vocals. The song is an Irish folk–style ballad and was written as a duet, with the Pogues' singer MacGowan taking the role of the male character, and MacColl playing the female character. It was originally released as a single on 23 November 1987 and later featured on the Pogues' 1988 album If I Should Fall from Grace with God.

Originally begun in 1985, the song had a troubled two-year development history, undergoing rewrites and aborted attempts at recording, and losing its original female vocalist along the way, before finally being completed in August 1987. Although the single has never been the UK Christmas number one, being kept at number two on its original release in 1987 by the Pet Shop Boys' cover of "Always on My Mind", it has proved enduringly popular with both music critics and the public: to date, the song has reached the UK Top 20 on twenty two occasions since its original release in 1987, including every year at Christmas since 2005. As of September 2017, it had sold 1.2 million copies in the UK, with an additional 249,626 streaming equivalent sales, for a total of 1.5 million combined sales. In December 2023, the song was certified sextuple platinum in the UK for 3.6 million combined sales.

In the UK, "Fairytale of New York" is the most-played Christmas song of the 21st century. It is frequently cited as the best Christmas song of all time in various television, radio, and magazine-related polls in the UK and Ireland, including the UK television special on ITV in December 2012, where it was voted The Nation's Favourite Christmas Song.

== Background and song development ==
Although there is agreement among the band that "Fairytale of New York" was first written in 1985, the origins of the song are disputed. MacGowan insisted that it arose as a result of a wager made by the Pogues' producer at the time, Elvis Costello, that the band would not be able to write a Christmas hit single, while the Pogues' manager Frank Murray has stated that it was originally his idea that the band should try to write a Christmas song as he thought it would be "interesting". Banjo player Finer came up with the melody and the original concept for the song, which was set in County Clare on Ireland's west coast, involving a sailor in New York looking out over the ocean and reminiscing about being back home in Ireland. Finer's wife Marcia did not like the original seafaring story, and suggested new lyrics regarding a conversation between a couple at Christmas. Finer told NME, "I had written two songs complete with tunes, one had a good tune and crap lyrics, the other had the idea for 'Fairytale' but the tune was poxy, I gave them both to Shane and he gave it a Broadway melody, and there it was".

The song's title, the musical structure, and its lyrical theme of a conversation between a couple were in place by the end of 1985, and were described by MacGowan in an interview with Melody Maker in its 1985 Christmas issue:

I sat down, opened the sherry, got the peanuts out and pretended it was Christmas. It's even called "A Fairy Tale of New York", it's quite sloppy, more like "A Pair of Brown Eyes" than "Sally MacLennane", but there's also a céilidh bit in the middle which you can definitely dance to. Like a country and Irish ballad, but one you can do a brisk waltz to, especially when you've got about three of these [drinks] inside you... But the song itself is quite depressing in the end, it's about these old Irish-American Broadway stars who are sitting round at Christmas talking about whether things are going okay.

MacGowan had decided to name the song after J. P. Donleavy's 1973 novel A Fairy Tale of New York, which Finer was reading at the time and had left lying around the recording studio. In the same Melody Maker interview, MacGowan expressed regret that the song had not been completed in time to be released for Christmas that year and hinted that the track would appear on an EP that the Pogues were due to record shortly. In January 1986, the group recorded the song during the sessions with Costello that would produce the Poguetry in Motion EP, with bass player Cait O'Riordan singing the female part. Costello suggested naming the song "Christmas Eve in the Drunk Tank", after the song's opening lines, but the band were scornful of Costello's suggestion, with MacGowan pointing out to Costello that a song with such a title was unlikely to be favourably received and played by radio stations. The majority of the lyrics had been written while MacGowan was recovering in a bed in Malmö after being struck down with double pneumonia during a Pogues tour of Scandinavia in late 1985 – he later said, "you get a lot of delirium and stuff, so I got quite a few good images out of that". In 2025 a plaque was erected at the Hotel Temperance in Malmö to commemorate the composing of the song there.

However, despite several attempts at recording it, the group were unhappy with the results and the song was temporarily put aside, to be returned to at a later date. Guitarist Philip Chevron later said, "It was not quite there. It needed to have a full-on, confident performance from the band, which it lacked." The producer of the final version, Steve Lillywhite, diplomatically described the version recorded with O'Riordan's vocals as not "fully realised". Extracts from these earlier versions of the song are included on the 2008 box set Just Look Them Straight in the Eye and Say... POGUEMAHONE!!

In March 1986, the Pogues toured the US for the first time. The opening date of the tour was in New York City, a place which had long fascinated MacGowan and which inspired him to write new lyrics for the song. Among the members of the city's Irish-American community who saw the show and visited the band backstage after the concert were film-maker Peter Dougherty and actor Matt Dillon: both later became friends with the Pogues and played important roles in the video for "Fairytale of New York". Another inspiration was Sergio Leone's film Once Upon a Time in America, which MacGowan and whistle player Spider Stacy watched over and over again in the tour bus. Apart from shaping the ideas for the lyrics, MacGowan wrote a slow, piano-based introduction to "Fairytale of New York" influenced by the film's score by Ennio Morricone; the intro was later edited together with the more upbeat original melody to create the final song.

As 1986 went on, the Pogues encountered various problems that brought a halt to their recording activity. Their record label Stiff ran into financial difficulties and went into administration, although as the label still owned the rights to the Pogues' recordings this meant that a distribution deal had to be negotiated with a new label to release any new Pogues material. The group's deteriorating relationship with Costello saw them part ways with their producer, and, after increasingly erratic behaviour, Cait O'Riordan, who had become romantically involved with Costello, left the band in October 1986. The departure of O'Riordan meant the song had now lost its intended female singer.

== Recording ==
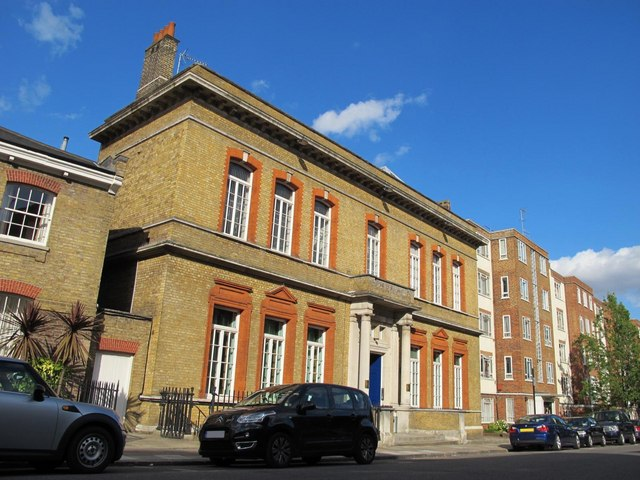
The finished track was recorded at RAK Studios in Regent's Park, London.

The problems at Stiff were eventually resolved, and the Pogues were finally able to enter a recording studio again in early 1987 to start work on their third album, now with Steve Lillywhite producing. A new demo of "Fairytale of New York" was recorded at London's Abbey Road Studios in March 1987, with MacGowan singing both the male and female roles. However, it was not until the third set of recording sessions in August 1987 in nearby RAK Studios that it was suggested that Lillywhite take the track back to his home studio and let his wife Kirsty MacColl lay down a new guide vocal for the song. Having worked on her vocals meticulously, Lillywhite brought the recording back to the studio where the Pogues were impressed with MacColl's singing and realised she would be the ideal voice for the female character in the song.

MacGowan later said, "Kirsty knew exactly the right measure of viciousness and femininity and romance to put into it and she had a very strong character and it came across in a big way... In operas, if you have a double aria, it's what the woman does that really matters. The man lies, the woman tells the truth." MacGowan re-recorded his vocals alongside the tape of MacColl's contribution (the duo never recorded the song together in the studio) and the song was duly completed with the addition of a harp played by Siobhan Sheahan and horns and a string section. The French horns and strings were recorded at Townhouse Studios on the last day of recording If I Should Fall from Grace with God, arranged by Fiachra Trench after band member James Fearnley had mocked up an arrangement on a keyboard.

Reflecting on the recording of the song during a 2020 interview, MacGowan said "it was a happy time for the group. It's our Bohemian Rhapsody". He paid tribute to MacColl for lending her vocals to the song: "I was very grateful to Kirsty. I don't think it would have been such a big hit without her contribution."

== Composition ==
The song follows an Irish immigrant's Christmas Eve reverie about holidays past while sleeping off a binge in a New York City drunk tank. When an inebriated old man also in the cell sings a passage from the Irish ballad "The Rare Old Mountain Dew", the narrator begins to dream of a former lover. The remainder of the song (which may be an internal monologue) takes the form of a call and response between the couple, their youthful hopes crushed by alcoholism and drug addiction, as they reminisce and bicker on Christmas Eve. The phrases "Sinatra was swinging" and "cars big as bars" seem to place the song in the late 1940s, although the music video clearly depicts a contemporary 1980s New York. On the impact of the lyrics, Helen Brown of The Daily Telegraph writes,

In careening wildly through a gamut of moods from maudlin to euphoric, sentimental to profane, mud-slinging to sincerely devoted in the space of four glorious minutes – it's seemed perfectly suited to Christmas – a time which highlights the disparity between the haves and have nots around the world. Those of us lucky enough to spend the day with friends and families by a cosy fire with a full stomach think of the lonely, the homeless and the hungry. As MacColl and MacGowan's dialogue descends from the ecstasy of their first kiss into an increasingly vitriolic argument their words puts the average family's seasonal bickering into perspective. "You're a bum you're a punk/ You're an old slut on junk..." The song's row ends with an expression of love and hope (against all the odds) as MacGowan's character promises MacColl's that, far from wrecking her dreams he has kept them with his own "Can't make it all alone," he pleads, "I've built my dreams around you."

== Music video ==
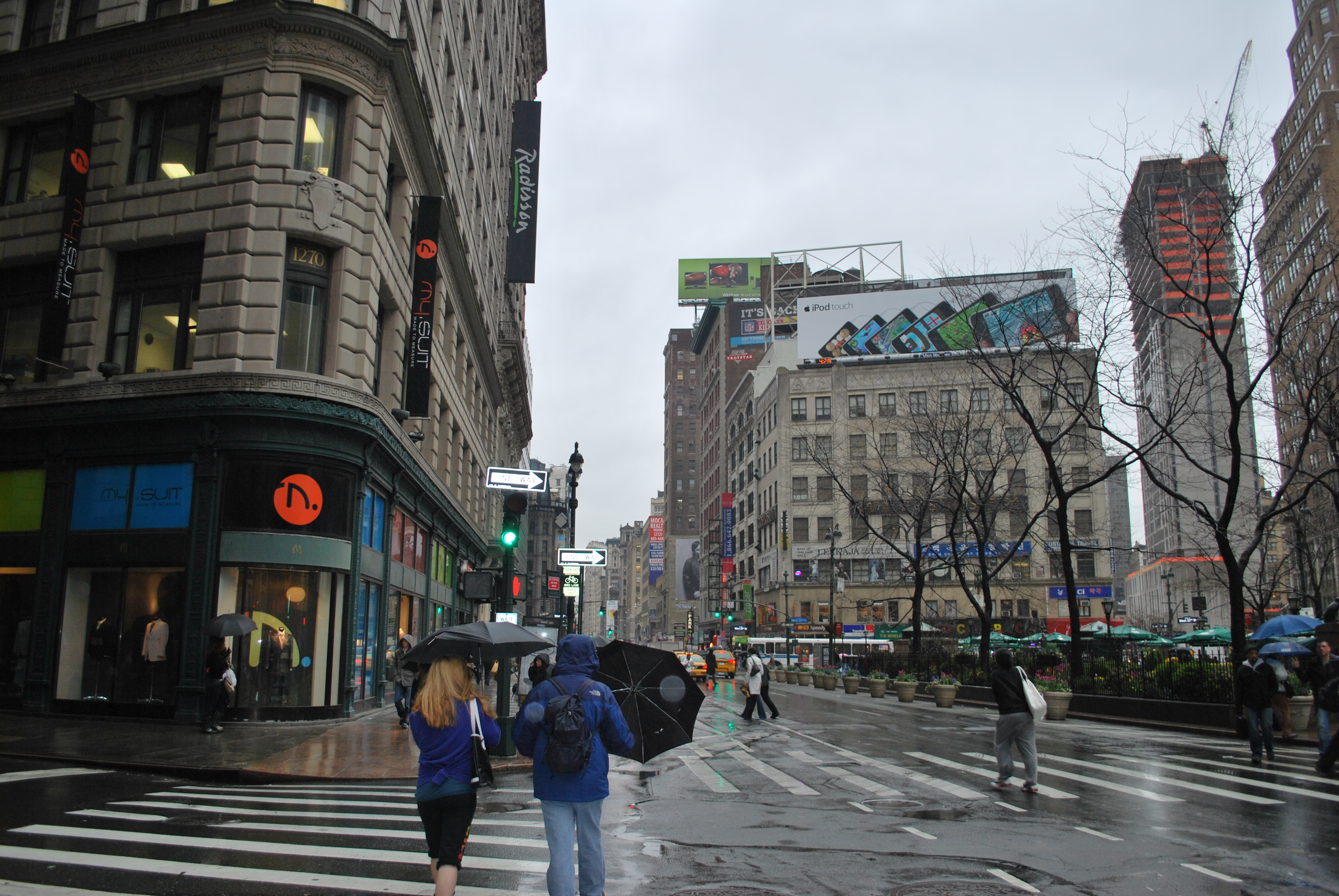
The music video sees Kirsty MacColl walking through Manhattan's West 33rd Street (pictured in 2009) in November 1987.

The video for the song was directed by Peter Dougherty and filmed in New York during a bitterly cold week in November 1987. The video opens with MacGowan sitting at a piano as if playing the song's opening refrain: however, as MacGowan could not actually play the instrument, the close-up shot featured the hands of the band's pianist Fearnley wearing MacGowan's rings on his fingers. Fearnley later said that he found the experience "humiliating" but accepted the idea that it looked better in the video to show MacGowan seated at the piano.

Part of the video was filmed inside a real police station on the Lower East Side. Actor Matt Dillon plays a police officer who arrests MacGowan and takes him to the cells. Dillon recalled that he had been afraid to handle MacGowan roughly, and had to be encouraged by Dougherty and MacGowan to use force. MacGowan and the rest of the band were drinking throughout the shoot, and the police became concerned about their increasingly rowdy behaviour in the cells. Dillon, who was sober, had to intervene and reassure the police that there would be no problems.

The chorus of the song includes the line "The boys of the NYPD choir were/still singing 'Galway Bay'". In reality, the NYPD (New York City Police Department) does not have a choir, the closest thing being the NYPD Pipes and Drums who are featured in the video for the song. The NYPD Pipes and Drums did not know "Galway Bay" and so sang a song that all of them knew the words to – the "Mickey Mouse March", the theme tune for The Mickey Mouse Club television series. The footage was then slowed down and shown in brief sections to disguise the fact the Pipes and Drums were singing a different song. Murray recalled that the Pipes and Drums had been drinking on the coach that brought them to the video shoot, and by the time they arrived they were more drunk than the band, refusing to work unless they were supplied with more alcohol.

== Critical reception ==
The song received widespread praise from the UK music press. In Sounds, Neil Perry awarded it "Single of the Week" and observed, "In fine MacGowan tradition it's not long before the insults are flying, still carried innocently along by the magical – and unforgettable – melody." Lysette Cohen of Record Mirror also made the record one of the magazine's Singles of the Week, calling it "the most wonderful Christmas record ever" and "staggering and drunkenly inspirational". In NME, James Brown said that "The Pogues excel themselves and release a record worthy of the Christmas no. 1 spot", concluding that the band "have claimed the art of the ballad to be their own – on the strength of 'New York' they deserve it". Andy Darling of Melody Maker stated that he was turned off by the idea that drinking was a prerequisite for artistic genius, but that "this [song] makes up for a lot though".

== Lyrical controversy and editing ==
When the song was performed on Top of the Pops on its initial release, the BBC requested that MacColl's singing of "arse" be replaced with the perceived-less-offensive "ass". During a live performance on Top of the Pops in January 1992, MacColl changed the lyric further, singing "You're cheap and you're haggard". When Katie Melua performed the song with the Pogues on CD:UK in December 2005, ITV censored the word "arse", but left "faggot" uncensored.

On 18 December 2007, BBC Radio 1 edited the words "faggot" and "slut" from the track to "avoid offence". MacColl's mother described the ban as "too ridiculous", while the Pogues said they found it "amusing". The BBC stated, "We are playing an edited version because some members of the audience might find it offensive". The BBC later announced they had reversed their decision and continued to play the song uncensored. Other BBC radio stations, including the traditionally more conservative Radio 2, had continued to play the original version throughout this period, the ban having applied to Radio 1 only. The MTV channels in the UK also removed and scrambled the words "slut", "faggot" and "arse" from the song.

In December 2018, two broadcasters on Ireland's RTÉ 2fm pop music station caused controversy by asking for the word "faggot" to be bleeped from broadcasts of the song. RTÉ announced they would not censor the lyric. Some days later, MacGowan defended the lyrics in a statement released to Virgin Media Television's The Tonight Show:

The word was used by the character because it fitted with the way she would speak and with her character. She is not supposed to be a nice person, or even a wholesome person. She is a woman of a certain generation at a certain time in history and she is down on her luck and desperate. Her dialogue is as accurate as I could make it but she is not intended to offend! She is just supposed to be an authentic character and not all characters in songs and stories are angels or even decent and respectable, sometimes characters in songs and stories have to be evil or nasty to tell the story effectively. If people don't understand that I was trying to accurately portray the character as authentically as possible, then I am absolutely fine with them bleeping the word, but I don't want to get into an argument.

In December 2019, BBC Radio Solent radio presenter Alex Dyke announced on his Twitter account that he would not be playing "Fairytale of New York" on his show, calling it a "nasty, nasty song" and "an offensive pile of downmarket chav bilge". Other journalists have also criticised the song's lyrics.

In November 2020, the BBC again announced that Radio 1 would play a censored version with the words "faggot" and "slut" removed, while Radio 2 would play the original, and 6 Music presenters would each decide for themselves which version to play. In response musician Nick Cave accused the BBC of "mutilating" the song, stating it would be "stripped of its value". However, since 2022 Radio 2 have played the radio edit supplied by the record company with the word "slut" muted and "You cheap lousy faggot" rephrased to "You're cheap and you're haggard". On 2 December 2023, The Telegraph reported that the UK's Boom Radio would play the uncensored version of "Fairytale of New York" after 91% of listeners who responded to a poll said they would not be offended by the lyrics.

== Releases and promotion ==
Originally released in 1987, Fairytale Of New York is widely regarded as the greatest Christmas single never to have reached Christmas Number 1; so much so that this heartfelt tale of festive excess has re-entered the Official Christmas Singles Chart Top 20 every year for the past eight years.

— Official Charts Company, December 2012.

The song was released in the United Kingdom and Ireland in November 1987 and swiftly became a hit, spending five weeks at Number 1 in the Irish charts. On 17 December 1987, the Pogues and MacColl performed the song on the BBC's television show Top of the Pops, and it was propelled to number two on the official UK Top 75. Although the song finished 1987 as the 48th best seller of the year despite only a month's sales, it was denied the UK Christmas number one by the Pet Shop Boys' synth-pop version of "Always on My Mind". MacGowan was reported to have said "We were beaten by two queens and a drum machine". MacColl later said that she did not feel they were really in competition with the Pet Shop Boys as they were doing a completely different type of music.

The song was re-released by the Pogues in the UK in 1991 (reaching No. 36), and again in the UK and Ireland for Christmas 2005, reaching number three in the UK. All proceeds from the latter release were donated towards a mixture of homeless charities and Justice for Kirsty, a campaign to find out the truth behind MacColl's death in 2000. Due to the eligibility of downloads to chart even without a physical release, coupled with a more recent further boost from streaming data, the song has re-entered the Top 75 every December since 2005. It has now made the Top 20 on twenty two occasions including twenty one times in successive years, and the Top 10 on thirteen occasions, including individual runs of three and nine successive years, feats that no other single can match. Its twenty three visits to the chart to date now total 130 weeks on the official UK Top 75 (as of w/e 1 January 2026), making it the joint fourth most charted song of all time. In late 2012 it was declared a UK million-seller. The song is considerably less well known in the US.

On hearing the song following the vocalist MacColl's death in 2000, MacGowan stated "for a while it used to depress me. But now I just think it's a tribute to Kirsty." On 22 December 2005, the Pogues performed the song on a Friday Night with Jonathan Ross Christmas special on BBC One, with the female vocals taken by singer Katie Melua.

Following MacGowan's death in 2023, the song returned to No 1 in the Irish Singles Chart, on the same day as MacGowan's funeral and 36 years after it first topped the charts in Ireland. On 13 December 2023, The Pogues reissued the song as a charity 7-inch single in tribute to MacGowan and to benefit the Dublin Simon Community, an organization fighting homelessness, that MacGowan supported.

== Legacy ==
"Once upon a time a band set out to make a Christmas song. Not about snow or sleigh rides or mistletoe or miracles, but lost youth and ruined dreams. A song in which Christmas is as much the problem as it is the solution. A kind of anti-Christmas song that ended up being, for a generation, the Christmas song. It is loved because it feels more emotionally "real" than the homesick sentimentality of White Christmas or the bullish bonhomie of Merry Xmas Everybody, but it contains elements of both and the story it tells is an unreal fantasy of 1940s New York dreamed up in 1980s London."

— Dorian Lynskey of The Guardian on "Fairytale of New York: the story behind the Pogues' classic Christmas anthem", December 2012.

"Fairytale of New York" was announced as The Nation's Favourite Christmas Song in a 90-minute special on ITV on 22 December 2012, following a UK-wide survey of ITV viewers. In the UK it is the most-played Christmas song of the 21st century. The song has featured in many UK and Ireland-based surveys and polls:

- Number 1 in the VH1 greatest Christmas song chart three years running, in 2004, 2005, and 2006.
- Number 11 in Channel 4's 100 Greatest Christmas Moments.
- Number 27 on VH1's Greatest Songs Never to Make Number One.
- Number 23 on VH1's greatest lyrics.
- Number 96 in Q magazine's 100 Greatest Songs Of All Time.
- Number 84 on BBC Radio 2's top 100 greatest songs of all time poll.
- Number 204 in NME's 500 Greatest Songs of All Time.
- The Music Factory poll in December 2008 which found that the song was the favourite Christmas song.
- The UK's second-favourite single to have missed the number 1 slot.
- RTÉ 2fm listeners voted it second on The Ultimate Irish Playlist.
- Topped a blinkbox poll for the UK's favourite Christmas song, with the 1980s also voted the best decade for Christmas music (the other 1980s songs in the top 10 were Wham!'s "Last Christmas", Band Aid's "Do They Know It's Christmas?" and Chris Rea's "Driving Home for Christmas").

In topping another UK poll in December 2014, The Independent states, "The poll is the latest in a number of surveys that has named 'Fairytale of New York' the nation's favourite Christmas song." The song was the subject of BBC Radio 4's Soul Music series on 22 December 2015.

According to analysis of PRS for Music figures, it was estimated that the song generates £400,000 of royalties per year.

== Other versions ==
Ronan Keating and Moya Brennan recorded a cover version which was a B-side to Keating's single "The Way You Make Me Feel" in November 2000. Keating performed the song with Lucie Jones on Magic Radio's The Magic of Christmas in 2023.

The song was covered by American singer Jon Bon Jovi in 2020 as part of a three-track EP, A Jon Bon Jovi Christmas, and features re-written lyrics as well as Bon Jovi singing both vocal parts. The version was widely panned by both critics and fans, and labelled one of the worst songs of 2020 by several publications. Irish musician Rob Smith said: "I have heard Bon Jovi's cover of Fairytale of New York. It's the worst thing to ever happen to music, and I am including both the murder of John Lennon and Brian McFadden's solo career in there. This is worse!" The Pogues' Twitter account retweeted the post, adding "What Rob said". Steve Lillywhite, producer of the original track, additionally wrote, "The worst ever version of this song. Sorry Jon... embarrassing and pointless". However, MacGowan reportedly enjoyed the "interesting and soulful" cover, according to a tweet from his wife Victoria Mary Clarke.

In 1999, punk rock band No Use for a Name covered the song for their 1999 album More Betterness!, with Cinder Block, the lead singer of the punk rock band Tilt, performing MacColl's parts. AllMusic reviewer Mike DaRonco complimented the band's "abrasive" cover of the song.

In November 2023, NFL players and brothers Jason Kelce and Travis Kelce covered the song as "Fairytale of Philadelphia" for the charity album A Philly Special Christmas, raising money for the Children's Crisis Treatment Center and Children's Hospital of Philadelphia. The Kelce brothers' version adjusts the lyrics by moving the story to Philadelphia and changing the plot from a romantic relationship to one between brothers and rivals, in addition to choosing more creative insults.

Following MacGowan's death on 30 November 2023, Glen Hansard and Lisa O'Neill performed the song at his funeral.

Hozier covered the song during his December 2024 appearance on Saturday Night Live. His rendition included changes to the first and third lines of the song's controversial third verse, which respectively became "You're a bum, you're a punk, you're an old hag on junk" and "You scumbag, you maggot, you’re cheap and you’re haggard.”

== Track listings ==
=== 1987 original release ===
- 7" single
1. "Fairytale of New York" (Jem Finer, Shane MacGowan) – 4:33
2. "The Battle March Medley" (Terry Woods) – 4:07
- 12", cassette and CD single
1. "Fairytale of New York" (Finer, MacGowan) – 4:33
2. "The Battle March Medley" (Terry Woods) – 4:07
3. "Shanne Bradley" (MacGowan) – 3:38

Note: Shanne Bradley was one of MacGowan's bandmates in his previous group the Nips.

=== 1991 reissue ===
- 7" and cassette single
1. "Fairytale of New York" (Finer, MacGowan) – 4:33
2. "Fiesta" (Finer, MacGowan) – 4:33
- 12" and CD single
1. "Fairytale of New York" (Finer, MacGowan) – 4:33
2. "A Pair of Brown Eyes" (Live) (MacGowan) – 3:40
3. "The Sick Bed of Cúchulainn" (Live) (MacGowan) – 3:16
4. "Maggie May" (Live) (Rod Stewart, Martin Quittenton) – 4:23

Live tracks recorded at Barrowland Ballroom, Glasgow, 1987

=== 2005 reissue ===
- 7" single
1. "Fairytale of New York" (Finer, MacGowan) – 4:33
2. "The Battle March Medley" (Woods) – 4:07
- CD single
1. "Fairytale of New York" (Finer, MacGowan) – 4:33
2. "Fairytale of New York" (instrumental) (Finer, MacGowan) – 4:30

=== 2012 reissue ===
- 7" single
1. "Fairytale of New York" (Finer, MacGowan) – 4:33
2. "Fairytale of New York" (instrumental) (Finer, MacGowan) – 4:30

== Charts ==
=== Weekly charts ===
Weekly chart performance for "Fairytale of New York" from 1987 to 2013
Chart (1987)	Peak position
Ireland (IRMA)	1
UK Singles (Official Charts)	2
Chart (1988)	Peak position
New Zealand (Recorded Music NZ)	5
Chart (1991)	Peak position
Ireland (IRMA)	10
UK Singles (Official Charts)	36
Chart (2005)	Peak position
Ireland (IRMA)	3
UK Singles (Official Charts)	3
Chart (2006)	Peak position
Norway (VG-lista)	18
UK Singles (Official Charts)	6
Chart (2007)	Peak position
Ireland (IRMA)	3
Norway (VG-lista)	9
Sweden (Sverigetopplistan)	24
UK Singles (Official Charts)	4
Chart (2008)	Peak position
Ireland (IRMA)	8
Norway (VG-lista)	15
Sweden (Sverigetopplistan)	38
UK Singles (Official Charts)	12
Chart (2009)	Peak position
Ireland (IRMA)	13
Norway (VG-lista)	12
UK Singles (Official Charts)	12
Chart (2010)	Peak position
Ireland (IRMA)	11
Norway (VG-lista)	15
Sweden (Sverigetopplistan)	16
UK Singles (Official Charts)	17
Chart (2011)	Peak position
Ireland (IRMA)	7
New Zealand (Recorded Music NZ)	34
Norway (VG-lista)	17
Sweden (Sverigetopplistan)	28
UK Singles (Official Charts)	13
Chart (2012)	Peak position
Ireland (IRMA)	9
Japan (Japan Hot 100)	99
New Zealand (Recorded Music NZ)	37
Norway (VG-lista)	13
Sweden (Sverigetopplistan)	22
UK Singles (Official Charts)	12
Chart (2013)	Peak position
Ireland (IRMA)	8
Japan Hot 100 (Billboard)	85
New Zealand (Recorded Music NZ)	27
Slovenia (SloTop50)	45
Sweden (Sverigetopplistan)	20
UK Singles (Official Charts)	14

Weekly chart performance for "Fairytale of New York" from 2014 to 2025
Chart (2014)	Peak position
Japan (Japan Hot 100)	86
Ireland (IRMA)	10
New Zealand (Recorded Music NZ)	31
Sweden (Sverigetopplistan)	25
UK Singles (Official Charts)	11
Chart (2015)	Peak position
Japan (Japan Hot 100)	87
Ireland (IRMA)	6
Sweden (Sverigetopplistan)	26
UK Singles (Official Charts)	13
Chart (2016)	Peak position
Ireland (IRMA)	6
Sweden (Sverigetopplistan)	16
UK Singles (Official Charts)	15
Chart (2017)	Peak position
Ireland (IRMA)	2
New Zealand (Recorded Music NZ)	22
Sweden (Sverigetopplistan)	14
UK Singles (Official Charts)	5
Chart (2018)	Peak position
Ireland (IRMA)	3
Latvia (DigiTop100)	53
Netherlands (Single Top 100)	80
New Zealand (Recorded Music NZ)	15
Norway (VG-lista)	8
Sweden (Sverigetopplistan)	15
Switzerland (Schweizer Hitparade)	92
UK Singles (Official Charts)	4
Chart (2019)	Peak position
Australia (ARIA)	49
Ireland (IRMA)	6
Netherlands (Single Top 100)	74
Norway (VG-lista)	8
Portugal (AFP)	93
Slovenia (SloTop50)	44
Switzerland (Schweizer Hitparade)	67
UK Singles (Official Charts)	4
Chart (2020)	Peak position
Ireland (IRMA)	7
Norway (VG-lista)	24
Portugal (AFP)	103
Sweden (Sverigetopplistan)	14
Switzerland (Schweizer Hitparade)	59
UK Singles (Official Charts)	4
Chart (2021)	Peak position
Ireland (IRMA)	7
UK Singles (Official Charts)	4
Chart (2022)	Peak position
Australia (ARIA)	46
Netherlands (Single Top 100)	71
Switzerland (Schweizer Hitparade)	48
UK Singles (Official Charts)	9
Chart (2023)	Peak position
Australia (ARIA)	45
Austria (Ö3 Austria Top 40)	57
Ireland (IRMA)	1
Japan Hot Overseas (Billboard Japan)	12
Netherlands (Single Top 100)	52
Sweden (Sverigetopplistan)	12
Switzerland (Schweizer Hitparade)	40
UK Singles (Official Charts)	4
Chart (2024)	Peak position
Australia (ARIA)	33
Ireland (IRMA)	6
Japan Hot Overseas (Billboard Japan)	19
UK Singles (Official Charts)	8
Chart (2025)	Peak position
Ireland (IRMA)	4
Portugal (AFP)	91
Sweden (Sverigetopplistan)	10
UK Singles (Official Charts)	5
Chart (2026)	Peak position
Global 200 (Billboard)	47

=== Year end charts ===
Year-end chart performance for "Fairytale of New York"
Chart	1987	2005	2006	2007	2008	2009	2010	2011	2012	2021	2023
UK Singles	48	73	126	89	106	191	196	179	178	86	73

== Certifications ==
Certifications for "Fairytale of New York"
Region	Certification	Certified units/sales
New Zealand (RMNZ)	3× Platinum	90,000^{‡}
Portugal (AFP)	Gold	12,000^{‡}
United Kingdom (BPI) Sales since 2005	7× Platinum	4,200,000^{‡}
^{‡} Sales+streaming figures based on certification alone.

== See also ==
- List of songs about New York City
