= Streets of Sorrow/Birmingham Six =

Song by The Pogues

from the album If I Should Fall from Grace with God
- Released: 1988
- Genre: Folk ("Streets of Sorrow"); Celtic punk ("Birmingham Six")
- Length: 4:39
- Label: Island
- Songwriters: Terry Woods ("Streets of Sorrow"); Shane MacGowan ("Birmingham Six")
- Producer: Steve Lillywhite

"Streets of Sorrow/Birmingham Six" is a political song by the Irish folk punk band The Pogues, written by Terry Woods and Shane MacGowan and included on the band's 1988 album If I Should Fall from Grace with God.

== Structure ==
The song is divided into two parts, the first ("Streets of Sorrow"), written and sung by Woods, describes the pain and sadness on the streets of Northern Ireland at the height of the Troubles. The song is told from the point of view of someone who is leaving the place due to the increasing violence and conflict and who vows never to return "to feel more sorrow, nor to see more young men slain".

The second part of the song ("Birmingham Six"), written and sung by MacGowan, is a demonstration of support to the Birmingham Six and Guildford Four and the view that they were the victims of a miscarriage of justice and that their confessions had been extracted by torture at the hands of the West Midlands Serious Crime Squad, stating "there were six men in Birmingham, in Guildford there's four, who were picked up and tortured and framed by the law, and the filth got promotion, but they're still doing time, for being Irish in the wrong place and at the wrong time". Although this was later admitted to be the case by the British courts, at the time the people involved were still convicted and imprisoned for carrying out the Birmingham pub bombings and the Guildford pub bombing during the 1970s.

The last couplet of the song reads, "While over in Ireland eight more men lie dead/ Kicked down and shot in the back of the head", which McGowan stated was a reference to the Loughgall ambush.

== Controversy ==
"Streets of Sorrow/Birmingham Six" proved to be hugely controversial. The group performed the song on the Channel 4 show Friday Night Live on 15 April 1988, but the show cut to advertising before the song was finished. James Fearnley, biographer of The Pogues, wrote that the band had said in advance that they would be performing and performed the song in a camera rehearsal, without any comment being made.

The song was subsequently banned from being broadcast by the British Independent Broadcasting Authority under laws which were also responsible for a ban on the broadcasting of direct interviews with members of Sinn Féin and other groups. The IBA said the song alleged that "convicted terrorists are not guilty, the Irish people were put at a disadvantage in the courts of the United Kingdom and that it may have invited support for a terrorist organisation such as the IRA".

In 1991, the Birmingham Six were released after having their convictions overturned in the Court of Appeal and the allegations of torture at the hands of authorities were vindicated. The convictions of the Guildford Four — also mentioned in the song — had already been overturned in 1989. The song's ban was subsequently lifted, yet when it featured on a Channel 4 documentary in the early 1990s the channel was still not allowed to play the song, only to show the words on screen.

== Bibliography ==
- Fifty MPs sign petition against year-old ban on broadcast interviews with Sinn Fein
- A Record of The Pogues appearances on television
