= The Radiators from Space =

Irish punk rock band

- Also known as: The Radiators (1978–81, 1987–89); The Radiators (Plan 9) (2003–06)
- Origin: Dublin, Ireland
- Years active: 1976–1981, 1987–89, 2003–2013
- Label: Chiswick Records
- Past members: Steve Rapid; Pete Holidai; Philip Chevron; Jimmy Crashe; Mark Megaray; Billy Morley; Nick Hurt; Neil Whiffen; Cait O'Riordan; Johnny Bonnie; Enda Wyatt; Paddy Goodwin; Jesse Booth
- Website: theradiators.irish

The Radiators from Space, also known as The Radiators, The Rads, Radiators (from Space), and The Radiators Plan 9, were an Irish punk rock band. They have been described as Ireland's first punk band. Initially active 1976–1981, the band had a brief reunion in 1987–1988, and reformed in 2003 until the death of founding member Philip Chevron in 2013, with remaining members continuing as Trouble Pilgrims.

== History ==
The band formed in 1976 in Dublin, and consisted of Philip "Chevron" Ryan, Pete Holidai, Steve "Rapid" Averill, Jimmy "Crashe" Wynne and Mark "Megaray" Hogan. Founded during punk's first wave, they are generally regarded as Ireland's first punk band. They signed to Chiswick Records and released the album TV Tube Heart in 1977. Their first single "Television Screen" was the first and only punk record to make the Irish top 20, and was featured on many punk compilation albums over the next few years. The band toured Ireland and the UK, including stint opening for Thin Lizzy on the UK leg of their 1977 Bad Reputation tour, and a headlining UK tour of their own in 1978. Shortening their name to The Radiators, the band released their second album, Ghostown, in 1979. Produced by Tony Visconti, Ghostown received critical acclaim, but failed to sell well. After a move to London, the band disbanded in 1981.

After some solo recording, Philip Chevron went on to join The Pogues. Steve Averill became a successful designer in the 1980s, known for his work for the band U2. In 1987, The Radiators reformed for one gig, an AIDS benefit in Dublin. The Chevron-penned song Under Clery's Clock, a love song and a protest against homophobia, is premiered at the show and released as a single the following year.

The band reunited in December 2003, using the name "The Radiators Plan 9". Original members Chevron, Holidai, and Rapid were joined by former Pogue Cait O'Riordan on bass and vocals, and Johnny Bonnie on drums. The band played three shows, including a Joe Strummer tribute and an appearance at the Oxegen Festival, as well as making several live radio appearances. Some of these performances were compiled onto the Television Screen 2004 EP, released on the 625 record label. The Summer Season EP, which included two new songs, was released in 2005. O'Riordan departed the band, replaced by new bass player Jesse Booth in February 2006. Reverting to the name The Radiators From Space, the band released their third studio album Trouble Pilgrim in October 2006. On 21 December 2006, they played at 'The Point', Dublin, as a special guest of The Pogues. The band's fourth album, Sound City Beat, a collection of cover versions of songs by older Irish bands, was released in 2012.

Members of the band began performing as Trouble Pilgrims after member Philip Chevron became ill with throat cancer and was unable to participate in live work. The band played, including with guest vocalist Gavin Friday and guitarist Brush Shiels, at a tribute concert for Chevron on 24 August 2013 at the Olympia Theatre (Dublin). Philip Chevron died on 8 October 2013, effectively ending the band, although remaining members have continued as Trouble Pilgrims which is fronted by Holidae who also hosts a weekly music show on Dublin city fm.

In 2026, The Radiators From Space were announced as support act for the Sex Pistols feat. Frank Carter's 7 December show at 3Arena (Dublin), with Holidai later confirming the lineup as himself, his Trouble Pilgrims bandmate Tony St. Ledger, and Liz Lawlor & Ro Callaghan of Dublin band The Thrash Blues..

The song "Television Screen", as covered by Centipede on the Roof, became the title theme to the comedy TV series The Blizzard of Odd (2001–05). The Radiators' songs have been recorded by Moving Hearts and Christy Moore ("Faithful Departed") and Mary Coughlan ("Kitty Rickets"), among others.

== Discography ==
=== Studio albums ===
- TV Tube Heart (The Radiators from Space, Chiswick Records, 1977)
- Ghostown (The Radiators, Chiswick Records, 1979)
- Trouble Pilgrim (The Radiators from Space, Chiswick Records, 2006)
- Sound City Beat (The Radiators from Space, Chiswick Records, 2012)

=== Live albums ===
- Dollar for Your Dreams: The Radiators Live! (The Radiators from Space, 1988) (Aid to Fight Aids Benefit, Dublin, 13 September 1987)
- Alive-Alive-O! Live in London (The Radiators from Space, Chiswick Records, 1996) (live in London 1978, plus rare studio tracks)
- Live at the Southend Kursaal 1977 (The Radiators from Space, Rejected Records, 2005) (recorded live in 1977, final night of the Thin Lizzy tour)

=== Compilation albums ===
- Buying Gold in Heaven: The Best of the Radiators (From Space) 1977–1980 (Hotwire Records, 1985)
- Cockles and Mussels: The Very Best of the Radiators (The Radiators, Chiswick, 1995)

=== EPs ===
- Four on the Floor (The Radiators, Big Beat Records, 1980) (compilation)
- Television Screen 2004 (The Radiators Plan 9, 27 October 2004)
- The Summer Season (The Radiators Plan 9, 6 June 2005)
- Midnite Demos (The Radiators from Space, Rejected Records, 2005) (first demo, recorded at Trend Studios, Dublin, 31 October 1976)

=== Singles ===
- "Television Screen" (1977)
- "Enemies" (b/w "Psychotic Reaction", 1977)
- "Sunday World" (1977)
- "Million Dollar Hero" (1978)
- "Walking Home Alone Again" (1978)
- "Let's Talk About the Weather" (b/w "Making Time", 1979)
- "Kitty Rickets" (Agnes Bernelle with the Radiators, Mulligan Records, 1979)
- "Kitty Ricketts" (1979)
- "Stranger Than Fiction" (1980)
- "The Dancing Years" (1980)
- "Song of the Faithful Departed" (1981)
- "Under Clery's Clock" (1989)
- "Behind the Painted Screen" (b/w "I'm Gonna Turn My Life Around", 2012) (promo only)
