= The Dubliner's Dublin =

Studio album by The Dubliners
- Released: 1988
- Label: Harmac
- Producer: Eamonn Campbell

The Dubliners chronology
25 Years Celebration (1987)	The Dubliner's Dublin (1988)	30 Years A-Greying (1992)

Professional ratings
Review scores
Source	Rating
Allmusic	3/5 stars

The Dubliner's Dublin is the last of The Dubliners' albums to be released on vinyl, The Dubliner's Dublin coincided with Dublin City's millennium celebrations. The lineup was Ronnie Drew, Barney McKenna, John Sheahan, Seán Cannon and Eamonn Campbell and there were also a number of guest musicians. Campbell again took on the role of producer. A video containing some of the music from the album was also released, combining with a tour of Dublin narrated by Ronnie Drew.

== Track listing ==
=== Side One ===
1. "Finnegan's Wake"
2. "Raglan Road"
3. "The Zoological Gardens"
4. "Hornpipes - The Honeysuckle/The Golden Eagle"
5. "Sez She"
6. "Three Lovely Lassies from Kimmage"
7. "Johnny Doyle"
8. "Weile Waile"
9. "Bombo Lane"
10. "The Monto"

=== Side Two ===
1. " The Auld Triangle"
2. "The Dublin Jack of All Trades"
3. "Dicey Reilly"
4. "Reels - Ríl Gan Ainm/Sheahan's Reel/Jenny's Wedding"
5. "The Ragman's Ball"
6. "Seven Drunken Nights"
7. "Christ Church"
8. "The Spanish Lady"
9. "The Rare Oul' Times"
