= Rum Sodomy & the Lash =

Studio album by the Pogues
- Released: 5 August 1985
- Studios: Elephant Studios, Wapping, London
- Genres: Celtic punk; folk punk; new wave
- Length: 42:55
- Labels: Stiff (UK & Europe); MCA (US & Canada)
- Producer: Elvis Costello

The Pogues chronology
Red Roses for Me (1984)	Rum Sodomy & the Lash (1985)	Poguetry in Motion (1986)

Singles from Rum Sodomy & the Lash
- 1. "A Pair of Brown Eyes" Released: 18 March 1985; 2. "Sally MacLennane" Released: 10 June 1985; 3. "Dirty Old Town" Released: 19 August 1985

Rum Sodomy & the Lash is the second studio album by the London-based, Irish folk punk band the Pogues, released on 5 August 1985. The album reached number 13 on the UK charts. The track "A Pair of Brown Eyes", based on an older Irish tune, reached number 72 on the UK singles chart. "The Old Main Drag" later appeared on the soundtrack to the film My Own Private Idaho.

== Title ==
The album's title is taken from a quotation attributed to Winston Churchill: "Don't talk to me about naval tradition. It's nothing but rum, sodomy, and the lash". The title was suggested by drummer Andrew Ranken, who said "it seemed to sum up life in our band".

== Artwork ==
The cover artwork is an altered version of The Raft of the Medusa, a Romantic-era painting by Theodore Géricault, with the band members' heads, painted by Peter Mennim, replacing those of various figures on the raft.

== Recording ==
Elvis Costello, whose manager Jake Riviera approached the band, was originally employed to produce two songs for a single, "A Pair of Brown Eyes" and "Sally MacLennane", but after recording at Elephant Studios in Wapping was extended Costello agreed to record the entire album. Chevron later said, "The Pogues needed, more than anything, not to be not so much as produced as facilitated. Recording the band as live as possible, but with a great deal of natural acoustic presence in the instruments – was quite a revolutionary thing to do in 1985." Costello said, "I saw my task was to capture them in their dilapidated glory before some more professional producer fucked them up."

== Critical reception and accolades ==
Professional ratings
Review scores
Source	Rating
AllMusic	4.5/5 stars
The Irish Times	5/5 stars
Mojo	5/5 stars
Pitchfork	9.5/10
Record Mirror	4/5
The Rolling Stone Album Guide	4/5 stars
Sounds	4.5/5 stars
Spin	4/5 stars
Uncut	5/5 stars
The Village Voice	A

Rum Sodomy & the Lash received very positive reviews from critics. Melody Maker's Adam Sweeting said, "The brightest, most intense moments of Rum ... aren't about particularities of style or delivery. This is, apart from anything else, music to hang on to other people by to stave off brutal fact and the weight of history. While The Pogues make music for drunks as well, probably, as anyone has they're also dragging an oft-ignored folk tradition into the daylight with an altogether improbable potency ... Rum ... has soul, if not a great deal of innovation, and somewhere among the glasses and the ashtrays lie a few home truths." Sounds' Jane Simon called Rum Sodomy & the Lash "the finest slice of story-telling your heart could wish for". David Quantick of NME described the record as "a collection of free-ranging stuff to be sure; from the funereal folk ballad to the near spaghetti-western instrumental, raucous celebration to brown study, cheerful melody to downright strangeness. It's never sentimental, it's rarely polite, and it's certainly not ordinary ... Rum Sodomy and the Lash is more than the best record The Pogues could be expected to make at this time. It's more than a brilliant example of a band using its resources in an imaginative manner. It's probably the best LP of 1985." Robert Christgau of The Village Voice wrote that "none of it would mean much without the songs—some borrowed, some traditional, and some proof that MacGowan can roll out bitter blarney with the best of his role models."

In a retrospective review, Mark Deming of AllMusic stated that Rum Sodomy & the Lash "falls just a bit short of being the Pogues' best album, but was the first one to prove that they were a great band, and not just a great idea for a band." Daniel Bristow of the Irish music website CLUAS awarded the album an eight out of ten, calling it "a record that will never cease to delight, always a pleasure to hear and highly, highly recommended if you're not familiar with it already". Mark Cooper of Q described the record as "a proud, defiant bruise of an album that manages to be both profoundly bleak and immoderately romantic and it remains MacGowan's and The Pogues' finest hour". Uncut's Jon Wilde wrote that "the most startling thing about their second album was the steep ascendancy of MacGowan's songwriting", while Spin's Jon Dolan said that the album contained "some of the purest toothless lyricism in punk-rock history."

In 2000, Q placed Rum Sodomy & the Lash at number 93 in its list of the 100 Greatest British Albums Ever. In 2012, the album was ranked number 440 on Rolling Stone's The 500 Greatest Albums of All Time list. Pitchfork named it the 67th best album of the 1980s. The album was also included in the book 1001 Albums You Must Hear Before You Die.

In 2025, Loudersound wrote: "You can argue all you like that The Pogues weren’t new wave or post-punk (see the intro for justification) but their brand of Irish folk punk was fired up by the spirit of '77 and a direct reaction to the arty futurists who’re stereotypically thought of as new wave."

== Reissues ==
A remastered and expanded version of Rum, Sodomy & the Lash was released for compact disc by WEA in the European market on 11 January 2005; this re-issue was released on September 19, 2006, by Rhino Records in the United States. The remastered disc added six bonus tracks, including the entirety of the Poguetry in Motion EP and the B-sides to "Dirty Old Town" – "A Pistol for Paddy Garcia" on seven-inch and "The Parting Glass" on twelve-inch singles. The reissue included liner notes by David Quantick and a poem about the Pogues by Tom Waits.

== Track listing ==
Standard edition – Side one
No.	Title	Writer(s)	Length
1.	"The Sick Bed of Cúchulainn"	Shane MacGowan	2:59
2.	"The Old Main Drag"	MacGowan	3:19
3.	"The Wild Cats of Kilkenny"	MacGowan, Jem Finer	2:48
4.	"I'm a Man You Don't Meet Every Day"	Traditional; arranged by the Pogues	2:55
5.	"A Pair of Brown Eyes"	MacGowan	4:54
6.	"Sally MacLennane"	MacGowan	2:43

Standard edition – Side two
No.	Title	Writer(s)	Length
1.	"Dirty Old Town"	Ewan MacColl	3:45
2.	"Jesse James"	Traditional; arranged by the Pogues	2:58
3.	"Navigator"	Phil Gaston	4:12
4.	"Billy's Bones"	MacGowan	2:02
5.	"The Gentleman Soldier"	Traditional; arranged by the Pogues	2:04
6.	"And the Band Played Waltzing Matilda"	Eric Bogle	8:10

Bonus tracks (2005 reissue)
No.	Title	Writer(s)	Originally from	Length
13.	"A Pistol for Paddy Garcia"	Finer	B-side of "Dirty Old Town"	2:31
14.	"London Girl"	MacGowan	Poguetry in Motion EP	3:05
15.	"Rainy Night in Soho"	MacGowan	Poguetry in Motion EP	5:36
16.	"Body of an American"	MacGowan	Poguetry in Motion EP	4:49
17.	"Planxty Noel Hill"	Finer	Poguetry in Motion EP	3:12
18.	"The Parting Glass"	Traditional; arranged by the Pogues	B-side of "Dirty Old Town" 12-inch single	2:14

== Personnel ==
Credits are adapted from the liner notes of Rum Sodomy & the Lash and Poguetry in Motion, except where noted.

The Pogues

- Shane MacGowan – vocals
- Spider Stacy – tin whistle, vocals on "Jesse James"
- James Fearnley – accordion
- Jem Finer – banjo
- Cait O'Riordan – bass, vocals on "I'm a Man You Don't Meet Every Day"
- Andrew Ranken – drums
- Philip Chevron – guitar, mandolin on "The Parting Glass"

Additional personnel

- Henry Benagh – fiddle
- Dick Cuthell – French horn
- Tommy Keane – uilleann pipes
- Terry Woods – string instruments on Poguetry in Motion
- Fiachra Trench – string arrangements on Poguetry in Motion

Technical personnel

- Elvis Costello – producer
- Philip Chevron – producer on "A Pistol for Paddy Garcia" and "The Parting Glass"
- Nick Robbins – engineer (2005 reissue remastering)
- Paul Scully – engineer
- Dave Jordan – engineer on Poguetry in Motion
- Bob Kraushaar – engineer on Poguetry in Motion
- Nick Davis – engineer on Poguetry in Motion
- Peter Mennim – cover art (heads)
- Théodore Géricault – original painting
- Frank Murray – sleeve concept
- Cindy Palmano – photography
- Lilly Lee – hand lettering

== Charts ==
Chart performance for Rum Sodomy & the Lash
Chart (1985–1986)	Peak position
Australian Albums (Kent Music Report)	89
New Zealand Albums (RMNZ)	17
Swedish Albums (Sverigetopplistan)	39
UK Albums (Official Charts)	13

2025 chart performance for Rum Sodomy & the Lash
Chart (2025)	Peak position
Hungarian Physical Albums (MAHASZ)	32

== Certifications ==
Certifications for Rum Sodomy & the Lash
Region	Certification	Certified units/sales
France (SNEP)	Gold	100,000^{*}
United Kingdom (BPI)	Gold	100,000^{^}
^{*} Sales figures based on certification alone.^{^} Shipments figures based on certification alone.
