= Will Glahé =

German musician (1902–1989)

Will Glahé (February 12, 1902 – November 21, 1989) was a German accordionist, composer, and bandleader.

Glahé was born at Elberfeld, Germany. In the 1930s, he was, along with Heinz Munsonius and Albert Vossen, one of the most successful accordionists in Germany. He led his own orchestra from 1932 and became successful particularly in popular music.

One of his most famous songs in Germany was his 1936 recording of "Rosamunde" (a German female forename), a cover version of the song "Škoda lásky" ("Wasted Love") by Jaromir Vejvoda. Under the title "Beer Barrel Polka", the tune hit No. 1 on the Hit Parade in the United States in 1939. It sold over one million copies by 1943, and was awarded a gold disc by the RIAA. After World War II he was known as the "Polka King" in the U.S., and did both big band and folk music arrangements with his orchestra.

His "Liechtensteiner Polka" was also a hit in Canada, reaching No. 11, and the U.S., hitting No. 16 on the Billboard Hot 100 in 1957. The follow-up single "Sweet Elizabeth" (1958) appeared in all major U.S. charts, nearing the top 40 in Cashbox and Music Vendor.

He had some success with "The Cuckoo Waltz" by Swede E. I. Jonasson in 1969, and the song is now used widely, in the Alice in Wonderland dark ride at Blackpool Pleasure Beach and in Efteling, Holland.

His album, Oktoberfest peaked at number 53 in Australia in 1973.

He died at Rheinbreitbach.

== Bibliography ==
- Joel Whitburn, The Billboard Book of Top 40 Hits. 7th edn, 2000, p. 265.
- Elijah Wald, How the Beatles Destroyed Rock & Roll. Oxford, 2009, ch. 10 & 11.
