= If I Should Fall from Grace with God (song) =

1988 song performed by The Pogues

Single by The Pogues

from the album If I Should Fall from Grace with God
- Released: 22 February 1988
- Genre: Celtic punk
- Length: 2:21
- Songwriter: Shane MacGowan

The Pogues singles chronology
"Fairytale of New York" (1987)	"If I Should Fall from Grace with God" (1988)	"Fiesta" (1988)

"If I Should Fall from Grace with God" is a single released by The Pogues in February 1988, from the album of the same name If I Should Fall from Grace with God (released in January 1988). It followed the band's Christmas classic, "Fairytale of New York", but did not enjoy the same widespread success, stalling at Number 58 in the UK singles Chart. The video for the single was filmed at a live show.

An earlier recording of the song, performed at a slower tempo, appeared on the Straight to Hell soundtrack in 1987.

The faster-paced 1988 recording found on the subsequent single release was heard beginning October 2010 on U.S. commercials for the Subaru Forester, featuring a woman shuttling around hockey-playing children, while the lyrics of the first two verses, which constitute the song's main chorus, are heard prominently for the duration of the advertisement.
