= I'm a Man You Don't Meet Every Day =

Scottish–Irish folk song

"I'm a Man You Don't Meet Every Day" (Roud 975), also known by the title Jock Stewart or Jock Stuart,is a traditional Scottish or Irish music hall song written from the point of view of a rich landowner telling the story of his day while buying drinks at a public house. According to Archie Fisher, the song is "an Irish narrative ballad that has been shortened to an Aberdeenshire drinking song".

Various versions of the song exist. A "boastful Irish ditty" of that title is recorded as early as the 1880s. It was also passed on from Frederick “Cauliflower” Crossman, who had worked with Cecil Sharp, to Crossman's granddaughter. Its most famous version is Jeannie Robertson's from 1960. A popular version was recorded in 1985 by the Pogues, with bass player Cait O'Riordan on vocals. In both Robertson's and O'Riordan's versions, the song's first-person narrator is presented by a woman, despite the song's masculine narrative.

== Recordings ==
- Jeannie Robertson on Scottish Ballads and Folk Songs (1960)
- The McCalmans on Smuggler (1975)
- Archie Fisher on The Man With a Rhyme as Jock Stewart (1976)
- The Tannahill Weavers on The Tannahill Weavers (1979)
- Dougie MacLean on CRM (1979), as Jock Stewart
- Houghton Weavers on In The Rare Ould Times (1983)
- The Pogues on Rum Sodomy & the Lash (1985)
- The Dubliners on 30 Years A-Greying (1992)
- Danú on All Things Considered (2002)
- Hadrian's Wall on Hadrian's Wall (2006), as Jock Stewart
- Fontaines D.C. - Live recording for SiriusXM (2020)
- The Banshees of Inisherin - Partially performed in pub scene of 2022 film.
- The Murder Capital live performance at Other Voices (2023)

== See also ==
- Roud Folk Song Index
