= Tuesday Morning (song) =

Single by The Pogues

from the album Waiting for Herb
- Released: August 9, 1993
- Genre: Celtic rock
- Length: 3:30
- Label: WEA
- Songwriter: Spider Stacy

The Pogues singles chronology
"Honky Tonk Women" (1992)	"Tuesday Morning" (1993)	"Once Upon a Time" (1993)

"Tuesday Morning" is a song recorded by Anglo-Irish Celtic punk band The Pogues, released in 1993 by WEA as a single from their first post-Shane MacGowan album, Waiting for Herb (1993). It was the band's last single to make the UK top 20. The song itself was composed by Spider Stacy. It reached number 18 on the UK Singles Chart and also culminated in their last performance on Top of the Pops. It is also their most successful single internationally, peaking at #11 on the US Billboard Modern Rock Tracks chart. The accompanying music video featured clips from Pogues videos from down the years.

== Charts ==
Chart (1993)	Peak position
Australia (ARIA)	166
Ireland (IRMA)	26
UK Singles (OCC)	18
UK Airplay (Music Week)	12
US Modern Rock Tracks (Billboard)	11
