= 25 Years Celebration =

Studio album by The Dubliners
- Released: 1987
- Genre: Irish folk
- Label: Harmac

The Dubliners chronology
Live In Carré (1985)	25 Years Celebration (1987)	Dubliner's Dublin (1988)

25 Years Celebration is a double album by The Dubliners. Recorded in 1987 and charted in the UK at No.43 and No.1 in Ireland. The album released following a special Late Late Show appearance by the group, 25 Years Celebration featured a number of special guests and featured "The Irish Rover", a collaboration with The Pogues, which returned The Dubliners to Top Of The Pops 20 years after they first performed "Seven Drunken Nights" on that show.

== Track listing ==
Side One
No.	Title	Length
1.	"Dubliners"
2.	"Rose of Allendale"
3.	"Salonika"
4.	"Reels – Cooleys/The Dawn/Mullingar Races"
5.	"Now I'm Easy (with Stockton's Wing)"
6.	"Sally Wheatley"
7.	"Oró Sé do Bheatha 'Bhaile"

Side Two
No.	Title	Length
1.	"The Irish Rover" (with the Pogues)
2.	"Molly Malone"
3.	"Protect and Survive"
4.	"Planxty Irwin"
5.	"Three Score and Ten"
6.	"Don't Get Married"
7.	"Luke – A Tribute" (Christy Moore)

Side Three
No.	Title	Length
1.	"Ballad of St. Anne's Reel"
2.	"Cill Chais"
3.	"Cúnla" (with Stockton's Wing)
4.	"Clavalitos"
5.	"Jigs – Humours of Glendart/Saddle the Pony/Brian O'Lynn"
6.	"Leaving Nancy"
7.	"O'Connell's Steam Engine" (Paddy Reilly)
8.	"Rambling Rover"

Side Four
No.	Title	Length
1.	"The Last of the Great Whales"
2.	"Mountain Dew" (with the Pogues)
3.	"Red Roses for Me"
4.	"Marino Waltz"
5.	"Cod Liver Oil"
6.	"I Loved the Ground She Walked Upon" (Jim McCann)
7.	"Love is Pleasing"
8.	"Sick Note"

== Chart performance ==
Chart (1987)	Peak position
Irish Albums (IRMA)	1
UK Albums (OCC)	43
