= I'm Asking You Sergeant, Where's Mine =

"I'm Asking You Sergeant, Where's Mine" (also known by the shorter title "Sergeant, Where's Mine") is a folk song written and first performed in the mid-1970s by Scottish comedian, actor and singer Billy Connolly. It was later popularized by The Dubliners. Inspired by The Troubles in Northern Ireland, it is told from the point of view of a wounded soldier and makes ironic reference to British Army recruitment advertisements of the era that showed recruits having a grand time in exotic places and enjoying such activities as skiing.

The first recording of the song, by Connolly, was included on his live album, Cop Yer Whack for This (Polydor ACB 00215, 1974) – the song's title was shortened to "Sergeant, Where's Mine?" for that release. Connolly re-recorded the song in 1992 backed by The Dubliners, and it was included on the group's album 30 Years A-Greying (Baycourt RTE-CD 157–30, 1992).

This song was one of several Connolly wrote with a military theme. Another was "Weekend Soldier", a song reminiscing about his own experiences serving in the Territorial Army, which he performed on his album Get Right Intae Him!.
