= The Fenians =

American Celtic rock band

- Origin: Orange County, California
- Genres: Celtic rock, world music
- Years active: 1990–present
- Labels: Mizen Head, Varèse Sarabande
- Members: Terry Casey; Rob Williams; Tardu Yegin; Brendan Harkins; Bryon Holley
- Past members: Nate Light; Andy Mendoza; Chris Pierce; Dave Burnett
- Website: thefenians.com

The Fenians are a Celtic rock band from Orange County, California. They take their name from a pair of organizations known as the Fenians dedicated to the establishment of an independent Irish Republic in the 19th and early 20th centuries, as well as the Fianna of Irish mythology. Their stated influences include Elvis Costello, U2, The Pogues, and Bob Dylan.

== History ==
The Fenians were formed in 1990 in Orange County, California. Since that time, they have released five studio albums, one greatest hits album, and a live DVD. They have toured throughout the United States and Ireland. They perform regularly at Yucaipa's Concert in the Park. In 2009, the Fenians were named best world act at the Orange County Music Awards.

The Fenians were formed in 1990 in Orange County, California by the son of Irish immigrants, mandolin player-singer Terry Casey, as an outlet for his love of the Irish folk songs that were sung in his childhood home. The Fenians played in local Irish pubs, infusing Irish folk tunes with the rock and roll-punk energy Terry absorbed in his teen years with Patrick "Murph" Carey on acoustic guitar and Gordon McGrath on bass. McGrath was replaced within a few years by Brendan Harkins on bass and vocals, who contributed to the first cassette recording, "Sons of Ireland". Rob Williams, at the time a member of The Bold Fenian Men, an Irish folk quartet, then replaced Carey on guitar and vocals. This lineup was to become the core of the Fenians' sound, in addition to Casey's mandolin tone, as Williams' baritone and Harkins' tenor rounded out the vocal harmonies to Casey's lead vocals. Matt Jones soon joined the band as its first drummer but was replaced after a short time by Andy Mendoza, who recorded the first two albums, 1993's Live at the Harp and 1994's Distant City Street, with the band. He left the band soon after to join Ozomatli and was replaced by drummer Chris "the Animal" Pierce. Around the same time, the Fenians expanded their sound by adding a whistle and saxophone player, Tardu Yegin. (Saxophonist Ian Jones had played pub gigs with the Fenians for many years previously but did not perform on any recordings). This incarnation of the Fenians produced the albums Band of Rogues (1999), a live blend of original, traditional, and contemporary Irish tunes and Have Fun or Get Out (2001), a restating of back catalog favorites with the new lineup. These recordings also marked vocal contributions from Williams and Harkins. Yegin left the band in 2002 and was replaced by Dave Burnett, who played whistle, flute and saxophone on "Every Day's a Hooley", the Fenians' most eclectic offering to date. The band went through several subsequent lineup changes, Casey and Pierce being the only constants, enlisting Stuart Martz on guitar/fiddle/vocals, Kenny Cosca on bass and vocals, and Nate Light- bass/vocals with no recorded output apart from a cover of Steve Earle's "Galway Girl" that was added to the 2007 Varese Sarabande/Universal release The Best of the Fenians. Pierce left the band in 2010. The current lineup consists of Terry Casey, Rob Williams, Brendan Harkins, Tardu Yegin and drummer Bryon Holley and released in June 2013 their follow-up to "Hooley", Take Me Home.

== Members ==
- Terry Casey: Mandolin, electric guitar and lead vocals
- Bryon Holley: Drums and vocals
- Rob Williams: Acoustic guitar and vocals
- Tardu Yegin: Whistles, saxophone, flute and accordion
- Brendan Harkins: Bass, vocals, uilleann pipes

== Past members ==
- Nate Light: Bass/Vocals
- Chris Pierce: Drums/Vocals
- Andy Mendoza: Drums
- Dave Burnett: Whistles/Sax/Flute
- Kenny Cosca: Bass/ vocals
- Stuart Martz: Guitar/vocals
- Bryan Shaddix: Guitar/ vocals
- Patrick Carey: Guitar/vocals
- Gordon McGrath: Bass
- Ian Jones: Saxophone

== Discography ==
- Sons of Ireland (1991)
- Live at the Harp (1993)
- A Distant City Street (1994)
- Band of Rogues (1999)
- Have Fun or Get Out (2002)
- Every Day's a Hooley (2004)
- The Best of the Fenians: Couldn't Have Come at a Better Time (2007)
- Take Me Home (2013)
