= A Pair of Brown Eyes =

Single by The Pogues

from the album Rum Sodomy & the Lash
- B-side: "Whiskey You're the Devil"
- Released: 18 March 1985
- Genre: Celtic rock
- Length: 4:54
- Label: Stiff
- Songwriter: Shane MacGowan
- Producer: Elvis Costello

The Pogues singles chronology
"Boys from the County Hell" (1984)	"A Pair of Brown Eyes" (1985)	"Sally MacLennane" (1985)

"A Pair of Brown Eyes" is a single by The Pogues, released on 18 March 1985. It featured on the band's second album, Rum Sodomy & the Lash, and was composed by Pogues front man Shane MacGowan. The single was their first to make the UK Top 100, peaking at Number 72. The Los Angeles Times listed it among "The 10 Essential Shane MacGowan Songs."

ABC Australia writes that the song is "an unflinching take on World War I from the perspective of a drunken veteran."

== Composition and lyrics ==
=== Music ===
Its melody is loosely based on that of "Wild Mountain Thyme" (also known as "Will Ye Go Lassie Go"), a song by Francis McPeake in a traditional folk style. Album producer Elvis Costello contributed mandolin to the melody.

Music critic N. M. Reinholdt describes the song as a slow waltz with a cascade of accordion, banjo, and uilleann pipes, and McGowan's voice as "rusty as an old gate, but, in its mellowest register, radiantly warm and tender." Rolling Stone Australia writes, "Behind MacGowan, the band trudges on beautifully, the banjo and accordion conjuring rolling Irish hills." Guitarist Des Behan notes that it is "a mix of folk and punk. The accordion and fiddle weave a Celtic tapestry, creating a haunting and beautiful ode to enduring love."

=== Lyrics ===
The song references the Johnny Cash version of the song "A Thing Called Love": "And on the jukebox Johnny sang / About a thing called love". It also references Irish country music singers Ray Lynam and Philomena Begley's version of "My Elusive Dreams": "I looked at him, he looked at me / All I could do was hate him / While Ray and Philomena sang / Of my elusive dream". This dream is an image of the forever-lost brown eyes. Remembering the battlefield, the veteran sings, "Some prayed, then cursed, then prayed and bled some more / And the only thing that I could see / Was a pair of brown eyes that was looking at me / But when we got back, labeled parts one to three / There was no pair of brown eyes waiting for me / And a rovin', a rovin', a rovin' I'll go / For a pair of brown eyes... / I saw the streams, the rolling hills / Where his brown eyes were waiting / And I thought about a pair of brown eyes / That waited once for me."

Music essayist Max Mitchell calls the song "not only an example of a great love poem – it is also war poetry of the highest calibre." Examining the lyrics, he writes, "Beneath a screaming sky, the singer blends Wilfred Owen with Tolstoy. It's a staggering section of verse; a Prince Andrei-style epiphany that never comes true lying injured on the battlefield as the repetition of the thudding 'd' mimics the artillery: scattered, around, cursed, prayed, prayed, cursed, prayed, bled. Then there's the humour, 'labelled parts one to three', followed by the sense of tragedy that few women wait for legless soldiers."

Several reviewers observe MacGowan's literary influences. A Rolling Stone review of 2021's A Furious Devotion: The Life of Shane MacGowan comments that by the time of Rum Sodomy & the Lash, "MacGowan's writing was getting better and becoming more multi-dimensional, evident on songs like 'A Pair of Brown Eyes,' which was heavily steeped in allusions to traditional Irish music." N.M. Reinholdt writes, "MacGowan was incredibly well-read; any serious investigation into his lyrics reveals a profound grasp of literary tradition;" she is reminded of Wilfred Owen's poem "Dulce et Decorum Est", Rupert Brooke's poem "The Soldier," and the novel Sons and Lovers by D. H. Lawrence. The Pitchfork reviewer notes "an obvious Brendan Behan/James Joyce jones" in the song's gritty realism. PopMatters writes more inclusively, "From the moment he began penning songs, MacGowan was artistically indebted to his Irish homeland, a fact reflected in both music and lyrics. Literary touchstones spanned the Irish spectrum — Brendan Behan, James Joyce, Edna O'Brien, Flann O'Brien, Sean O'Casey, Frank O'Connor, and James Stephens were drawn from and their influence incorporated into his burgeoning songbook. While the idea of the songwriter-as-poet is often evoked in a clichéd (even insulting) manner to give certain artists 'credibility', MacGowan's awareness and adaptation of trends in the literary world, along with the narrative quality and structural experimentation of his work, should cement his status as both a musical and literary figure."

Pitchfork reports, "When MacGowan presented it to his bandmates, they were startled by its power... Fearnley was brought near tears." Interviewer Kevin Perry adds, "When he first played the band 'A Pair Of Brown Eyes,' guitarist Spider Stacy's initial response was: 'You sick fuck! Labelled parts one to three? What sort of a twisted, fucked-up sort of mind comes up with lyrics like that?' 'Mine,' said Shane."

== Themes ==
Reviewers found the "true" story within the song to be enigmatic. Listeners can find different ways to assess the potential relationship(s) between the two men in the song, primarily a young man at loose ends and an old veteran, who have an encounter in a pub. It is unclear which character speaks which lines, as the narrative point of view changes without warning; and there seem to be three men in the story, including the enemy in the war, and perhaps one or two women as well, who are not present. One or both of the two men might be remembering an ex-lover; the old man might be remembering the eyes of his enemy ("his brown eyes were waiting"), for whom he felt both hatred and kinship. The young man might hate the veteran or feel resentful empathy. Pitchfork writes of the narrative, "An old man buttonholes the narrator with horrific war stories, attempting to commiserate, but their existential divide yawns, while the eyes of the title haunt them both." Rolling Stone Australia reads it as the lament of one man rather than two: "In a bar, a war veteran listens to country songs on the jukebox as he recalls what he endured (the arms and legs of other men were scattered all around) and what he'll never get back. When he finally stumbles out, he hears the birds and the wind, but as MacGowan's already roughened voice conveys, his roving for peace of mind will never end."

Reinholdt interprets it this way: "They speak, but fail to connect, and the young man leaves to wander through the summer night, all the while propelled by the vision of what he has lost..." The young man stumbles out of the pub: "So, drunk to hell, I left the place / sometimes crawling, sometimes walking" and talking drunkenly to himself. Reinholdt concludes, "'A Pair of Brown Eyes' is nothing if not a portrait of loneliness — the old soldier, whiling away his time, and the young man who can't bear to listen to him." Yet another version, in PopMatters, asserts, "A young man is drinking, drowning his heartache while Johnny Cash plays on the jukebox. An old drunk corners him and begins to ramble about his own life, about how he came back from the war to discover his girl had gone off with another. The young drinker's immediate reaction is to despise the old sot for spoiling his orgy of self pity, and to stumble out of the pub in a rage. But then, he reconsiders. Perhaps he realises the old man has had much the harder life, and so develops a sense of perspective about his own. Or maybe he throws himself into the canal in despair. The issue is left unresolved, but the air of sorrow and entwined lives is left hanging by one of the Pogues' most effective works."

Treble argues that the song presents "a dislocated and poetic pastiche of a man in a pub and amidst the intensity and carnage of war."

MacGowan settled the matter in a 2012 interview with Kevin Perry:

"That song's about a guy who's pissed off because he's broken up with his girlfriend," Shane explains now. "There's also this older guy whinging away in the corner. There's people singing songs and it gives you the titles of them. [...] That particular song is kind of autobiographical. It's set in The Scottish Stores which is an Irish bar near Camden, do you know it?" It's now The Flying Scotsman, the rundown strip pub with blacked-out windows by King's Cross Station. "There'll always be someone, you'd be sitting there feeling miserable and some old geezer says: 'Why do you look so bloody miserable? Listen to what happened to me!' and he tells him about whatever war it was. Of course, there was a war going on at the time in Ireland, as usual."

N. M. Reinholdt is intrigued by MacGowan's choice to feature an old veteran: "One of the many things that distinguishes Shane MacGowan's songwriting is his abiding sympathy for the elderly" and for veterans of foreign wars. She remarks on the song's similarity with "And the Band Played Waltzing Matilda" from the same album, also narrated by a lonely, disabled veteran.

== Release ==
The twelve-inch vinyl single contains "A Pair of Brown Eyes" on the A-side and "Whiskey You're The Devil" and "Muirshin Durkin" on the B-side.

== Music video ==
The music video for the single, filmed in 1985, was directed by Alex Cox. It is set in a Nineteen Eighty-Four-esque Britain, now a police state, with Margaret Thatcher in the place of Big Brother as a supreme, god-like authoritarian figure. The video stars English singer Kirsty MacColl, who is annoyed by an old man on a train. It features roles played by band members as well as a cameo by the record's producer Elvis Costello. Images of eyes abound, with most characters in blindfolds or wearing goggles, and one official wears an eyepatch.

== Critical reception ==
Rolling Stone Australia places it at the top of their list of MacGowan's "25 Essential Songs," calling it "grand and poignant." The song was ranked number 9 among the "Tracks of the Year" for 1985 by NME. The Guardian includes it in their list of MacGowan's "10 Greatest Recordings," writing,

MacGowan's best songs come across like vibrant vignettes that illuminate larger human truths. The melancholy waltz "A Pair of Brown Eyes" features two strangers who meet in a bar and discover they have something painful in common: they're haunted by an ex who had brown eyes. One man is a veteran who took solace in the thought of his lady's brown eyes while being deployed, but discovered after he came home that his relationship was over. In turn, this tale of woe causes the other man to spiral into regret and sadness over his own lost, brown-eyed love. MacGowan's no-holds-barred imagery (the veteran observed "the arms and legs of other men / were scattered all around") places this pining in stark perspective.

PopMatters calls it a quixotic highlight of the album, "one of the more sentimental songs performed by the band. However, like everything MacGowan wrote in this period, it is laced with the typical dark elements that prevent it from becoming merely saccharine. Therefore, while the song laments the 'streams, the rolling hills, where his brown eyes were waiting' or 'The birds whistling in the trees / Where the wind was gently laughing', the protagonist is also 'drunk to hell', the setting filled with men who 'prayed, cursed, and bled some more'. In this moment, Shane MacGowan established an identity — one adapted from past writers (the contrast between sweet sentimentality and darker elements, humour intercepting both, a hallmark of Irish writing from Behan to Beckett), but an identity nonetheless."

2023 saw a great many obituaries and retrospectives for MacGowan, who died that November. Pitchfork wrote, "As a songwriter, MacGowan's greatest achievements were arguably... his ballads. 'A Pair of Brown Eyes' was his first masterpiece, and might be his most potent song—a nesting egg of stories within stories and songs within songs." Stereophile calls the song a "classic," and N. M. Reinholdt considers the song a revelation from a "ferocious heart": "the song took hold of me, in a way few other songs have."

== Legacy ==
"A Pair of Brown Eyes" was played at MacGowan's funeral. Musicians who have recorded or performed cover versions of the song include Christy Moore, Nick Cave, Melanie MacLaren, Peter Case, The Fenians, Primal Scream, the Young Dubliners, Titus Andronicus, and Meadhbh Walsh.

The song appears in Julien Temple's 2020 documentary film Crock of Gold: A Few Rounds with Shane MacGowan. Filmmaker Jim Jarmusch directed the music video for Cat Power's cover version of the song.

"A Pair of Brown Eyes" is used in the third-season episode "Of Vice and Men" of the TV show Veronica Mars.

Jem Finer, a founder of the Pogues who played the banjo in the band, told an interviewer, "I think I'll always be singing 'A Pair of Brown Eyes' 'til I die." In 2025, forty years after its release, the band are still playing the song on tour.
