= Sally MacLennane =

Single by The Pogues

from the album Rum Sodomy & the Lash
- B-side: "The Wild Rover"
- Released: 1985
- Genre: Celtic punk; drinking song
- Length: 2:43
- Label: Stiff
- Songwriter: Shane MacGowan
- Producer: Elvis Costello

The Pogues singles chronology
"A Pair of Brown Eyes" (1985)	"Sally MacLennane" (1985)	"Dirty Old Town" (1985)

"Sally MacLennane" was a single released by The Pogues in 1985. It was the second single by the band to make the UK Top 100, reaching number 54. The song was composed by Shane MacGowan and featured on the band's second album, Rum Sodomy & the Lash. The song is based on a bar his uncle owned which served Irish Ford workers in Dagenham.

Sally MacLennane is also a type of stout.
