= Thousands Are Sailing =

Song by The Pogues

from the album If I Should Fall from Grace with God
- Released: 1988
- Genre: Celtic rock
- Length: 5:28
- Label: Island
- Songwriter: Philip Chevron
- Producer: Steve Lillywhite

"Thousands Are Sailing" is a song by the Pogues, released in 1988. The song is an Irish folk style ballad, written by Philip Chevron, and featured on the Pogues' album If I Should Fall from Grace with God.

== History ==
Chevron wrote "Thousands Are Sailing" about the mass emigration of some 450,000 people from Ireland during the economic slump of the 1980s, paralleling the exodus during the Great Famine of the mid-1800s. Unlike in previous generations, tightening American immigration law resulted in these new Irish finding it difficult to obtain visas to settle legally in the United States, referenced in the lines "Where the hand of opportunity / Draws tickets in a lottery". By the end of the 1980s, there were as many as 200,000 undocumented Irish immigrants in the United States, about a third of them living in the New York metropolitan area. "Obviously I was aware that New York was full of Irish people because a lot of them were coming to see us when we played there. I've always made a connection between the past and the present," Chevron said. "The heart-sickness in 'Thousands Are Sailing' is not so much about missing home as about the alienation of being somewhere else, that sense of not belonging anywhere".

Chevron waited to introduce the song to the band until well into the recording sessions of If I Should Fall from Grace with God, lacking confidence due to his alcoholism and intimidated by Shane MacGowan's songwriting dominance. Producer Steve Lillywhite was receptive of the song, and the band's lukewarm attitude thawed after Terry Woods suggested some chord changes, which Chevron said "kicked off the magic". Initially, MacGowan refused to sing the line about dancing in the footsteps of Brendan Behan, as well as the line mentioning "guilt and weeping effigies", considering it blasphemous.

== Legacy ==
"Thousands Are Sailing" was one of the inspirations for the graphic novel Gone to Amerikay, by Derek McCulloch and Colleen Doran.
