= Cait O'Riordan =

British musician (born 1965)

- Born: Caitlín O'Riordan; 4 January 1965 (age 61); Lagos, Nigeria
- Origin: London, England
- Genres: Folk rock; folk punk; Celtic rock; Celtic punk
- Occupations: Musician; composer
- Instrument: Bass guitar
- Years active: 1979–present
- Formerly of: The Pogues; the Radiators
- Partner: Elvis Costello (1985–2002)

Caitlín O'Riordan (born 4 January 1965) is a British musician. She played bass guitar for the Pogues from 1983 to 1986. She later played with Elvis Costello as well as Bush Tetras and several other projects. She uses the name Rocky O'Riordan on social media and for her Sirius-XM radio show, The Rocky O'Riordan Show.

== Early life ==
Caitlín O'Riordan was born in Nigeria to Irish and Scottish parents, who moved to London when the Nigerian Civil War broke out in 1967. She rarely saw her father who was away on business; her mother raised the four children. She heard the Nips' song "Gabrielle" on the radio in 1979, and subsequently met Nips singer and future Pogues frontman Shane MacGowan, who was working at Rocks Off Records where she went to purchase the record. She left her home in 1981 at age 16 as soon as it was possible, and stayed in various Soho hostels.

== Career ==
In 1982, O'Riordan was invited by MacGowan to join his newly forming band Pogue Mahone as the bass guitarist. She owned a bass but had not played it until the invitation. She appeared on the group's first two albums, Red Roses for Me and Rum Sodomy & the Lash, the EP Poguetry in Motion, and several early singles, before leaving in 1986. Besides playing bass, she provided vocals for "I'm a Man You Don't Meet Every Day" on Rum Sodomy & the Lash, and for "Haunted" on the soundtrack to Alex Cox's film Sid and Nancy. The Pogues' most commercially successful song, "Fairytale of New York" from If I Should Fall from Grace with God, was written as a duet for O'Riordan and MacGowan, but the band eventually recorded it with Kirsty MacColl singing the female part. O'Riordan and Costello are mentioned in the lyrics to "Fiesta" from If I Should Fall from Grace with God.

In 1983, she became the singer in Darryl Hunt's jazz band Pride of the Cross. Hunt was familiar to her as a roadie for the Pogues. During her time with Pride of the Cross, she sang lead on their only single, "Tommy's Blue Valentine".

O'Riordan acted in the 1987 Alex Cox film, Straight to Hell, as the singing dancehall girl Slim McMahon, and also in the 1988 Frank Deasy film, The Courier.

"Haunted"
Sample of Caitlín O'Riordan singing "Haunted" with the Pogues

O'Riordan became romantically involved with Elvis Costello in 1985, while he was producing the Pogues' album Rum Sodomy & the Lash; the relationship lasted 16 years. Her former Pride of the Cross bandmate Darryl Hunt filled in for her on several shows during the Pogues' 1986 U.S. tour, and he replaced her permanently when she left later that year to join Costello on his King of America tour.

She co-wrote the track "Lovable" from that album, and wrote, co-wrote, and appeared on songs on Costello's subsequent albums Blood & Chocolate, Spike and Mighty Like a Rose.

In 2004, she joined Pogues' guitarist Phil Chevron's reunited band the Radiators; that year she toured with the Pogues for the first time in 18 years. She left the Radiators and was replaced in February 2006 by Jesse Booth, and went on to form a band of divorcées named PreNup with Hothouse Flowers guitarist Fiachna Ó Braonáin.

In 2012, O'Riordan completed a BA in Psychology, followed by an MPsychSc 2013 at UCD. In 2015 she was reportedly set to complete a PhD in Psychology at UCD.

In 2018, O'Riordan joined Pogues tin whistle player Spider Stacy to perform Pogues songs accompanied by Cajun music band Lost Bayou Ramblers under the name Poguetry. In February and March 2020 Poguetry played an eight date tour of the US.

Since 2020, O'Riordan has hosted a weekly radio show, "The Rocky O'Riordan Show", on U2-X Radio, an artist-branded channel which is part of SiriusXM.

On 5 April 2023, it was announced that O'Riordan had joined the Bush Tetras on bass.

== Personal life ==
O'Riordan said she has suffered from severe depression all her life. She was formally diagnosed in 2002, and she initiated private clinical treatment. She said in 2008 that she was also an alcoholic, but had taken her last drink in February 2007.

O'Riordan and Elvis Costello were reported to have married in May 1986 and media outlets described them afterwards as husband and wife. O'Riordan denies a formal union: "We weren't married... no piece of paper with marriage on it". Costello severed the relationship in 2002.
