= Fiesta (The Pogues song) =

Single by The Pogues

from the album If I Should Fall from Grace with God
- Released: 4 July 1988
- Genre: Celtic punk, folk punk, Latin rock
- Length: 4:12
- Songwriter(s): Jem Finer/Shane MacGowan/Edmund Kötscher/Rudi Lindt

The Pogues singles chronology
"If I Should Fall from Grace with God" (1987)	"Fiesta" (1988)	"Yeah Yeah Yeah Yeah Yeah" (1988)

"Fiesta" is a single by The Pogues featured on their 1988 album, If I Should Fall from Grace with God.

It was written by Jem Finer and Shane MacGowan, based on a Spanish fairground melody Finer had picked up. The refrain quotes "Liechtensteiner Polka" by Edmund Kötscher and Rudi Lindt.

The lyrics refer to the Spanish city of Almería, as well as former bassist Cait O'Riordan's departure from the group and subsequent relationship with Elvis Costello. The music video was directed by British comedian and actor Adrian Edmondson, and filmed on the roof of Casa Batlló in Barcelona.

"Fiesta" was the last new Pogues single featuring MacGowan to make the United Kingdom Top 30. The song is a live highlight, and has been included in most setlists since its release.

Glasgow-based football team Celtic sometimes play part of the song after scoring.
