= Edmund Kötscher =

German light music composer and bandleader

"Connie" Edmund Kötscher (17 April 1909 – 15 January 1990) was a German light music composer and bandleader.

== Life and career ==
Born in Berlin, Kötscher studied music at the Hochschule für Musik Franz Liszt, Weimar with Max Strub and Gustav Kulenkampff. He then worked as a conductor with various orchestras before leading his own dance orchestra. From 1933/34, he was concertmaster at the Admiralspalast in Berlin. After the Erhard Bauschke Orchestra was frequently on tour or otherwise contractually bound, Kötscher was commissioned to build up an orchestra for a German shortwave broadcaster. From 1939, he and his dance orchestra (a studio band of musicians from the Admiralspalast, to which the pianist Helmuth Wernicke also belonged) played a series of records for Imperial und Electrola such as Großstadtmelodie (Imperial 17269, with the Schuricke-Terzett), Fidele Geisterstunde and Cabaret der Noten (1939), Schön ist die Zeit der jungen Liebe, Sing mit mir (1942), (both with Herta Mayen) and Ich sag’ dir guten Morgen (ca. 1942/43, with Liselotte Malkowsky, Electrola 7310). Kötscher wrote about 2000 songs, mostly light music and hits like Abends in der kleinen Bar, Liechensteiner Polka, Amsterdamer Polka, Wenn die Lichter wieder scheinen (recorded by Arne Hülphers), but also Swing influenced pieces like Step Boys. He also composed works for accordion, big band and orchestra; in addition, he wrote an arrangement of Mozart's Violin concerto in G major.

Kötscher died in Berlin at the age of 80.
