= Andrew Ranken =

English drummer (1953–2026)

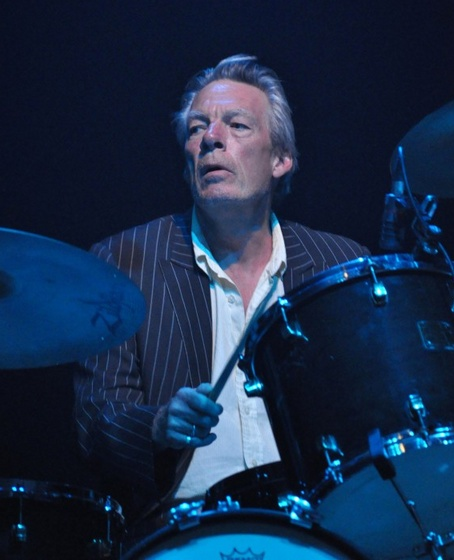
- Ranken in 2011

Background information
- Born: 13 November 1953; London, England
- Died: 10 February 2026 (aged 72)
- Genres: Celtic punk
- Instruments: Drums; harmonica; vocals
- Formerly of: The Pogues

Andrew Ranken (13 November 1953 – 10 February 2026) was an English drummer. He played with several bands including the Pogues, with whom he played from 1983 until their second breakup in 2014.

== Life and career ==
Ranken was born on 13 November 1953 in the Ladbroke Grove area of London. He spent his early childhood listening to his parents' jazz records before moving to Abbots Langley when he was five and Heathfield in East Sussex a year later. He attended Priory School, Lewes, where he was in the same year as Pete Thomas and Wreckless Eric, and was inspired by the Beatles and the Rolling Stones. He became a musician after an older cousin gave him a guitar he had tired of trying to learn and became a drummer after being given a pair of bongos. Aged 14, he joined a blues rock band, Joshua Bagmat, which was led by Stephen Warbeck, featured Thomas, and disbanded when the members left school. Ranken subsequently worked with Warbeck and Paul Bradley as part of The hKippers.

After leaving school, Ranken moved to London to spend a year at the Central School of Art and Design, where he formed the band Lola Cobra with three members of the sculpture department including Lene Lovich and her boyfriend Les Chappell. After losing interest in the course, he dropped out and sold his drumkit to fund a series of travels with the intention of writing a book of writings and drawings; first to a squat in Amsterdam, which he left after it was ransacked, followed by a tent in a campsite in suburban Holland, where he spent several weeks while working in a peanut factory. He then moved to France and then Italy, where the manuscript was stolen. He developed a dental abscess after returning to France and returned to his parents, now living in Epsom.

Ranken became the singer for a new wave and R&B band while living with his parents called The Stickers and later moved to Islington with a bandmember. He had a number of unpleasant jobs including spells as a painter and decorator, a builder, a screw factory operative, and a porter at St Bartholomew's Hospital. After his temp agency assigned him to work the incinerator at St Leonard's Hospital in Hackney, he walked out after finding a half-burnt Alsatian that smelt like bacon; he subsequently decided to take a three-year course in media studies and sociology at Goldsmiths in 1980. The Stickers disbanded around this time after it became impossible to keep members in the band, prompting Ranken to become the singer for The Operation with numerous friends and family members. He then moved into a squat in Huntley Street with his girlfriend and then to the Hillview Estate following an eviction.

In March 1983, Ranken joined the Pogues, then known as Pogue Mahone, where he replaced John Hasler on drums. He juggled both the Operation and the Pogues for a while until leaving the former to concentrate on the latter. With the Pogues, he spent the first two and a half years playing the drums while standing up, until he contracted blood poisoning and had to play one-handed while he recovered. He played on every song from their 1984 debut Red Roses for Me, on which he was credited as The Clobberer, until their 1996 album Pogue Mahone, including on "Fairytale of New York" and "The Irish Rover". Their 1991 compilation album The Best of The Pogues was dedicated to Ranken's long-term partner Deborah Korner, who had died earlier that year from an aneurysm; two songs on subsequent albums were also dedicated to Korner.

Ranken also performed with the Pogues from their reunion in 2001 until their official break up in 2014. Ranken released the charity single "Take Me Down to St. Joe's" in July 2023 with The Mysterious Wheels, a band containing two of Korner's brothers; the single was released in support of St Joseph's Hospice in Hackney following Ranken's own diagnosis of chronic obstructive pulmonary disease (COPD). Health issues caused Ranken to withdraw from The Pogues' 2024 tour. He died on 10 February 2026, at the age of 72. He had been married with two children.
