= Philip Chevron =

Irish musician (1957–2013)

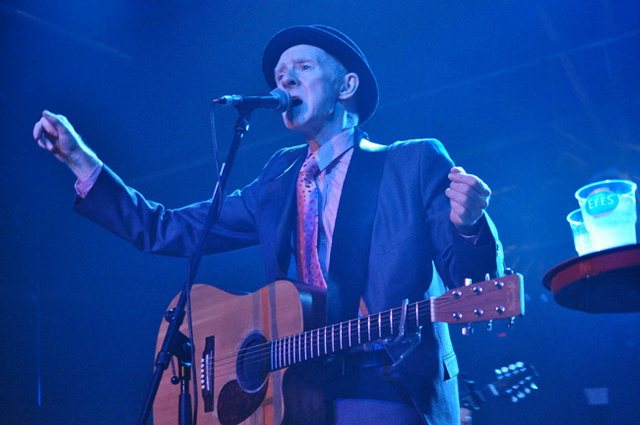
- Philip Chevron, Milk club, Moscow, August 2010 with the Pogues

Background information
- Born: Philip Ryan; 17 June 1957; Dublin, Ireland
- Died: 8 October 2013 (aged 56) Dublin, Ireland
- Genres: Punk rock; Celtic punk; folk punk
- Occupations: Musician; singer; songwriter
- Instruments: Guitar; banjo; mandolin
- Years active: 1976–2013
- Formerly of: The Pogues; The Radiators

Philip Ryan (17 June 1957 – 8 October 2013), professionally known as Philip Chevron, was an Irish singer-songwriter and guitarist and record producer. He was best known as the lead guitarist for the Celtic punk band the Pogues and as the frontman for the 1970s punk rock band The Radiators from Space. Upon his death in 2013, Chevron was regarded as one of the most influential figures in Irish punk music.

== Career ==
Chevron grew up in Santry, a suburb of Dublin. Beginning in the late 1970s, he was lead singer and co-founder of the punk rock group The Radiators from Space, receiving some critical acclaim but little widespread popularity or financial success. Following a temporary breakup of the band in 1981, he lived in London for a while, meeting and befriending Shane MacGowan through time spent working together at a record shop. Following the release of the Pogues' 1984 debut album Red Roses For Me, he was invited to join the band on a short-term basis as cover for banjo player Jem Finer's paternity leave. He took over as guitarist following MacGowan's decision to concentrate on singing—thereby becoming a full-time member of the band in time for the recording of its second album, Rum, Sodomy and the Lash.

Chevron wrote the songs "Thousands Are Sailing" and "Lorelei" among others. He left The Pogues in 1994 following problems with drugs and alcohol. In 2003, he reformed The Radiators (Plan 9) with ex-Pogues bassist Cait O'Riordan. They released the album Trouble Pilgrim in 2006.

In later years, he became The Pogues' unofficial spokesperson and frequently visited online forums, answering questions from fans. In 2004, he oversaw the remastering and re-release of The Pogues' entire back catalogue on CD. He toured regularly with The Pogues, who reunited after a 2001 tour.

== Personal life ==
Chevron was openly gay and penned the anti-homophobia song "Under Clery's Clock", which was first performed in 1987 when The Radiators reformed for one gig, an AIDS benefit in Dublin, and released as a single in 1989.

== Illness and death ==
In June 2007, The Pogues' website announced that Chevron had been diagnosed with oesophageal cancer. In early 2008, the website announced that Chevron had recovered, and that his hearing had returned to almost pre-treatment levels. He embarked on the March 2008 tour of the United States and sang "Thousands Are Sailing" at each performance. By 2009, Chevron was free of cancer.

However, in May 2013, it was announced that the cancer had returned and Chevron was terminally ill. His last public appearance was at the Olympia Theatre for a fundraiser in August of the same year. Chevron died on 8 October 2013 in Dublin at age 56.

== Discography ==
See also The Pogues and The Radiators From Space

=== Solo ===
- Songs From Bills Dance Hall (1981, Mosa Records, UK); 12" 45 rpm EP
- The Captains and The Kings (b/w Faithful Departed) (1983, Chapel/Demon Records, UK); 7" 45 rpm
- Songs From Bills Dance Hall (2006, CD re-release, Seaisland Sound Project, Japan)
- The Tuner: The Life of Jack Rooney (2024, CD & Digital release)

=== Compilations and anthologies ===
- For The Children (1990, Alias Records); Includes Philip Chevron on lead vocals on title song.
- Life in the Folk Lane (1992, Demon Records); Includes 1983 recording of "The Captains and The Kings"
- Life in the Folk Lane Vol. 2 (1995, Demon Records); Includes 1983 recording of "Faithful Departed"
- Bringing It All Back Home Vol. 3 (2000, Valley Entertainment); Includes a new recording of "Thousands Are Sailing"
