= Stiff Records discography =

- The original Stiff Records logo
- Studio albums: 65 SEEZ catalogue numbers
- Singles: 259 BUY catalogue numbers

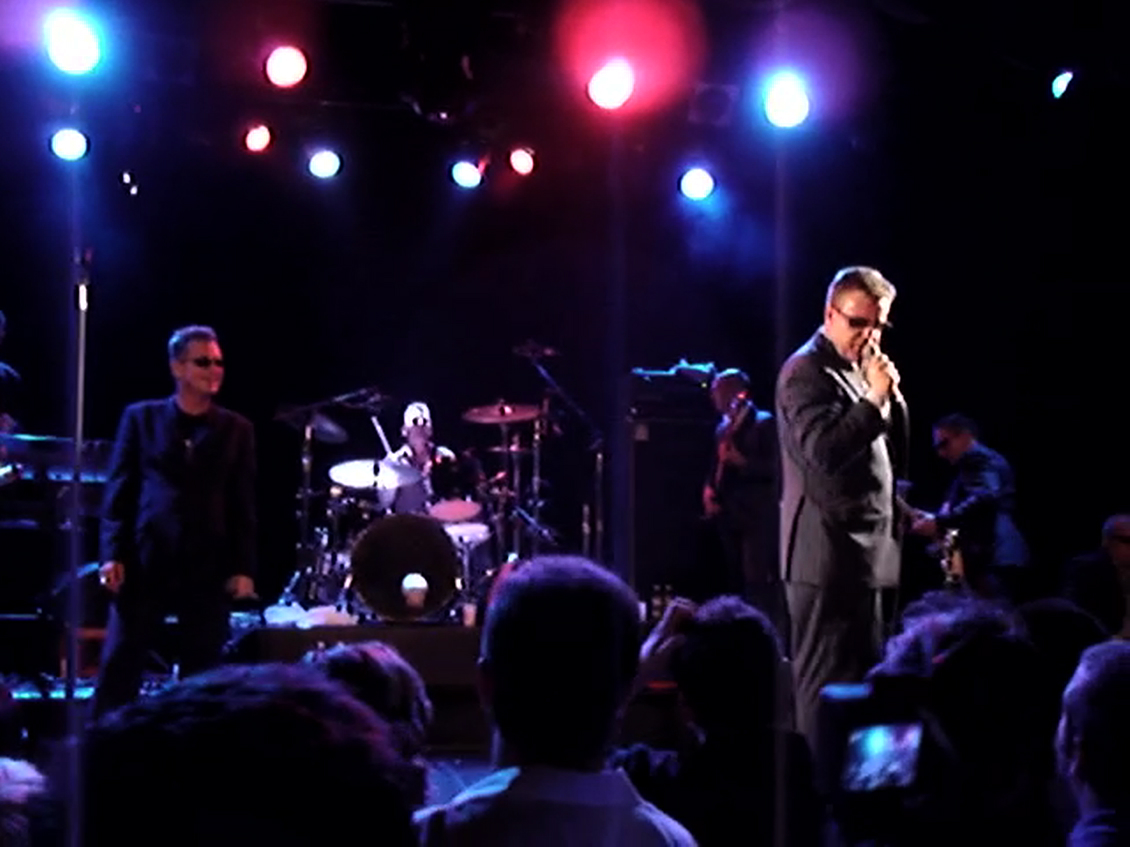
Madness are the 18th biggest selling group of all time in the UK, with combined record sales of 6.15 million. "Baggy Trousers" (Cat.No. BUY 84) is their greatest selling single.

The British independent record label Stiff Records has released 259 singles and 65 albums on general release in the United Kingdom with a prefix catalogue number of BUY and SEEZ respectively. Just under a quarter of all BUY singles releases charted in the UK Singles Chart and 22 of these have gone on to receive either a silver or gold disc from the British Phonographic Industry (BPI). Over one third of all SEEZ albums releases charted in the UK Albums Chart and 13 of these have gone on to receive either a silver, gold or platinum disc from the BPI. This list excludes non-BUY singles catalogue numbers such as DAMNED 1 ("Stretcher Case Baby" by The Damned), DEV 1 ("Jocko Homo" by Devo) and NY 7 ("Fairytale of New York" by The Pogues and Kirsty MacColl). It also excludes non-SEEZ album catalogue numbers such as FIST 1 (Hits Greatest Stiffs), GET 1 (Live Stiffs Live), and LENE 1 (Lene Lovich Speaks by Lene Lovich).

Damned Damned Damned (SEEZ 1) by The Damned was the first full-length album released by a UK punk group and "New Rose" (BUY 6) was the first single by a UK punk group. Other artists to have released singles or albums on BUY or SEEZ catalogue numbers include Elvis Costello, Madness, Ian Dury, Motörhead, Nick Lowe, Jona Lewie, Tracey Ullman, Desmond Dekker and Alvin Stardust.

This list also includes promotional singles that are generally distributed without charge to DJs and music journalists in advance of its general release, which is distributed commercially to the general public. A plug copy is another name for a promotional recording.

== Key ==
Denotes a promotional single.
Denotes that the single entered the UK Singles Chart.
Denotes that the album entered the UK Albums Chart.
Denotes an unissued single or album.
Denotes that a silver disc was awarded in the UK for either 200,000 singles sold or 60,000 albums sold.
Denotes that a gold disc was awarded in the UK for either 400,000 singles sold or 100,000 albums sold.
Denotes that a platinum disc was awarded in the UK for either 600,000 singles sold or 300,000 albums sold.

BUY Catalogue Series of General Release and Promotional Singles
Catalogue No.	Artist	Single	Release date / notes
BUY 1	Nick Lowe	"So It Goes"	PLUG COPY on label
BUY 1	Nick Lowe	"So It Goes"	14 August 1976
BUY 2	Pink Fairies	"Between the Lines"	PLUG COPY on label
BUY 2	Pink Fairies	"Between the Lines"	September 1976
BUY 3	Roogalator	"All Aboard"	September 1976
BUY 4	Tyla Gang	"Styrofoam"	PLUG COPY on label
BUY 4	Tyla Gang	"Styrofoam"	September 1976
BUY 5	Lew Lewis	"Boogie on the Street"	October 1976
BUY DJ 6	The Damned	"I'm So Bored (I Fall)"	1986, 45rpm, (Side A)
BUY DJ 6	Siouxsie and the Banshees	"Review & Interview", "Hong Kong Garden"	1986, 33 rpm, (Side B)
BUY 6	The Damned	"New Rose"	22 October 1976
BUY 7	Richard Hell	Another World	November 1976
BUY 8	Plummet Airlines	"Silver Shirt"	PLUG COPY on label
BUY 8	Plummet Airlines	"Silver Shirt"	November 1976
BUY 9	Motörhead	"White Line Fever"	December 1977
BUY 10	The Damned	"Neat Neat Neat"	18 February 1977
BUY 11	Elvis Costello	"Less Than Zero"	25 March 1977
BUY 12	Max Wall	"England's Glory"	1 April 1977
BUY 13	The Adverts	"One Chord Wonders"	29 April 1977
BUY 14	Elvis Costello	"Alison"	21 May 1977
BUY 15	Elvis Costello	"(The Angels Wanna Wear My); Red Shoes"	5 August 1977
BUY 16	Wreckless Eric	"Whole Wide World"	25 August 1977
BUY 17	Ian Dury	"Sex & Drugs & Rock & Roll"	26 August 1977
BUY 18	The Damned	"Problem Child"	28 September 1977
BUY 19	The Yachts	"Suffice to Say"	23 September 1977
BUY DJ 20	Elvis Costello	"Watching the Detectives"	DJ COPY EDITED; VERSION on label
BUY 20	Elvis Costello	"Watching the Detectives"	14 October 1977
BUY 21	Nick Lowe	"Halfway to Paradise"	21 October 1977
BUY 22	Larry Wallis	"Police Car"	28 October 1977
BUY 23	Ian Dury	"Sweet Gene Vincent"	
BUY 23	Ian Dury	"Sweet Gene Vincent"	27 November 1977
BUY 24	The Damned	"Don't Cry Wolf"	
BUY 24	The Damned	"Don't Cry Wolf"	2 December 1977
BUY 25	Wreckless Eric	"Reconnez Cherie"	10 February 1978
BUY 26	Jane Aire And The Belvederes	"Yankee Wheels"	14 April 1978
BUY 27	Ian Dury & the Blockheads	"What a Waste"	14 April 1978
BUY 28	The Box Tops	"Cry Like a Baby	19 May 1978
BUY 29	Humphrey Ocean the Hardy Annuals	"Whoops-a-Daisy"	16 June 1978
BUY 30	Jona Lewie	"The Baby, She's on the Street"	30 June 1978
BUY 31	Just Water	"Singin' in the Rain"	PLUG COPY on label
BUY 31	Just Water	"Singin' in the Rain"	4 August 1978
BUY 32	Lene Lovich	"I Think We're Alone Now"	PLUG COPY on label
BUY 32	Lene Lovich	"I Think We're Alone Now"	July 1978
BUY 33	Wazmo Nariz	"Tele-Tele-Telephone"	PLUG COPY on label
BUY 33	Wazmo Nariz	"Tele-Tele-Telephone"	29 September 1978
BUY 34	Wreckless Eric	"Take The Cash (K.A.S.H.)"	PLUG COPY on label
BUY 34	Wreckless Eric	"Take The Cash (K.A.S.H.)"	6 October 1978
BUY 35	Lene Lovich	"Home"	Not issued
BUY 36	Mickey Jupp	"Old Rock 'n' Roller"	PLUG COPY on label
BUY 36	Mickey Jupp	"Old Rock 'n' Roller"	6 October 1978
BUY 37	Jona Lewie	"Hallelujah Europa"	Not issued
BUY 38	Ian Dury & the Blockheads	"Hit Me with Your Rhythm Stick"	23 November 1978
BUY 39	Rachel Sweet	"B-A-B-Y"	PLUG COPY on label
BUY 39	Rachel Sweet	"B-A-B-Y"	16 November 1978
BUY 40	Wreckless Eric	"Crying, Waiting, Hoping"	PLUG COPY on label
BUY 40	Wreckless Eric	"Crying, Waiting, Hoping"	24 November 1978
BUY 41	Binky Baker & The Pit Orchestra	"Toe Knee Black Burn"	PLUG COPY on label
BUY 41	Binky Baker & The Pit Orchestra	"Toe Knee Black Burn"	1 December 1978
BUY 42	Lene Lovich	"Lucky Number"	2 February 1979
BUY 43	The Rumour	"Frozen Years"	23 February 1979
BUY 44	Rachel Sweet	"I Go to Pieces"	PLUG COPY on label
BUY 44	Rachel Sweet	"I Go to Pieces"	16 March 1979
BUY 45 PLUG	The Rumour	"Emotional Traffic"	PLUG COPY on label
BUY 45	The Rumour	"Emotional Traffic"	4 May 1979
BUY 46 DJ	Lene Lovich	"Say When"	1-sided only
BUY 46	Lene Lovich	"Say When"	4 May 1979
BUY 47	Kirsty MacColl	"They Don't Know"	PLUG COPY on label
BUY 47	Kirsty MacColl	"They Don't Know"	1 June 1979
BUY 48	Lew Lewis Reformer	"Win Or Lose"	PLUG COPY on label
BUY 48	Lew Lewis Reformer	"Win Or Lose"	8 June 1979
BUY 49	Wreckless Eric	"Hit And Miss Judy"	PLUG COPY on label
BUY 49	Wreckless Eric	"Hit And Miss Judy"	6 July 1979
BUY 50	Ian Dury & the Blockheads	"Reasons to be Cheerful, Part 3"	27 July 1979
BUY 51	Angie	"Peppermint Lump"	
BUY 51	Angie	"Peppermint Lump"	24 August 1979
BUY 52	The 45s	"Couldn't Believe A Word"	PLUG COPY on label
BUY 52	The 45s	"Couldn't Believe A Word"	31 August 1979
BUY 53	Lene Lovich	"Bird Song"	28 September 1979
BUY 54	The Duplicates	"I Want to Make you Very Happy"	
BUY 54	The Duplicates	"I Want to Make you Very Happy"	2 November 1979
BUY 55	Rachel Sweet	"Baby Let's Play House"	
BUY 55	Rachel Sweet	"Baby Let's Play House"	15 November 1979
BUY 56	Madness	"One Step Beyond"	26 October 1979
BUY 57	Kirsty MacColl	"You Caught Me Out"	Not issued
BUY 58	Michael O'Brien	"Made In Germany"	
BUY 58	Michael O'Brien	"Made In Germany"	9 November 1979
BUY 59	Pointed Sticks	"Out of Luck"	9 November 1979
BUY 60	The G.T.'s	"Boys Have Feelings Too"	
BUY 60	The G.T.'s	"Boys Have Feelings Too"	22 January 1980
BUY 61	Jona Lewie	"God Bless Whoever Made You"	PLUG COPY on label
BUY 61	Jona Lewie	"God Bless Whoever Made You"	23 November 1979
BUY 62	Madness	"My Girl"	21 December 1979
BUY 63	Lene Lovich	"Angels"	11 January 1980
BUY 64	Wreckless Eric	"A Popsong"	1 February 1980
BUY 65	The Feelies	"Everybody's Got Something to Hide (Except Me and My Monkey)"	1 February 1980
BUY 66	Dirty Looks	"Lie to Me"	22 February 1980
BUY 67	Rachel Sweet	"Fool's Gold"	
BUY 67	Rachel Sweet	"Fool's Gold"	8 February 1980
BUY 68	Lew Lewis Reformer	"1-30 2-30 3-35"	18 April 1980
BUY JB 69	Lene Lovich	"What Will I Do Without You"	
BUY 69	Lene Lovich	"What Will I Do Without You"	14 March 1980
BUY 70	Desmond Dekker	"Israelites"	3 April 1980
BUY DJ 71	Madness	"Night Boat to Cairo"	
BUY 71	Madness	"Night Boat to Cairo"	28 March 1980
BUY 72	Graham Parker	"Stupefaction"	2 May 1980
BUY 73	Jona Lewie	"You'll Always Find Me in the Kitchen at Parties"	21 March 1980
BUY 74	Any Trouble	"Yesterday's Love"	29 February 1980
BUY 75	Wreckless Eric	"Broken Doll"	14 March 1980
BUY 76	The Plasmatics	"Butcher Baby"	11 July 1980
BUY 77	Dirty Looks	"Let Go"	6 June 1980
BUY 78	The Go-Go's	"We Got the Beat"	9 May 1980
BUY 79	Any Trouble	"Second Choice"	27 June 1980
BUY 80	Rachel Sweet	"Spellbound"	6 June 1980
BUY 81	The Rumour	"The Little Red Book"	4 July 1980
BUY 82	Graham Parker	"Love Without Greed"	27 June 1980
BUY 83	Otis Watkins	"You Talk Too Much"	20 June 1980
BUY 84	Madness	"Baggy Trousers"	5 September 1980
BUY 85	Jona Lewie	"Big Shot - Momentarily"	11 July 1980
BUY DJ 86	The Stiffs	"Goodbye My Love"	
BUY 86	The Stiffs	"Goodbye My Love"	20 February 1981
BUY 87	Desmond Dekker	"Please Don't Bend"	18 July 1980
BUY DJ 88	Joe Carrasco	"Buena"	
BUY 88	Joe Carrasco	"Buena"	12 September 1980
BUY DJ 89	Dirty Looks	"Tailin' Love"	
BUY 89	Dirty Looks	"Tailin' Love"	17 October 1980
BUY 90	Ian Dury & the Blockheads	"I Want to Be Straight"	22 August 1980
BUY 91	The Plasmatics	"Monkey Suit"	5 September 1980
BUY DJ 92	The Rumour	"I Don't Want the Night to End"	
BUY 92	The Rumour	"I Don't Want the Night to End"	15 September 1980
BUY DJ 93	The Mexicano	"Trial By Television"	
BUY 93	The Mexicano	"Trial By Television"	26 September 1980
BUY DJ 94	Any Trouble	"Girls Are Always Right"	
BUY 94	Any Trouble	"Girls Are Always Right"	10 October 1980
BUY DJ 95	The Equators	"Baby Come Back"	
BUY 95	The Equators	"Baby Come Back"	10 October 1980
BUY 96	Graham Parker	"Endless Night"	Not issued
BUY 97	Lene Lovich	"New Toy"	27 February 1981
BUY DJ 98	Tenpole Tudor	"3 Bells in a Row"	
BUY 98	Tenpole Tudor	"3 Bells in a Row"	24 October 1980
BUY 99	Elmo and Patsy	"Santa Got Run Over by a Reindeer"	21 November 1989
BUY DJ 100	Ian Dury & the Blockheads	"Sueperman's Big Sister"	
BUY 100	Ian Dury & the Blockheads	"Sueperman's Big Sister"	7 November 1980
BUY DJ 101	John Otway	"Green, Green Grass of Home"	
BUY 101	John Otway	"Green, Green Grass of Home"	31 October 1980
BUY DJ 102	Madness	"Embarrassment"	
BUY 102	Madness	"Embarrassment"	14 November 1980
BUY DJ 103	Nigel Dixon	"Thunderbird"	
BUY 103	Nigel Dixon	"Thunderbird"	20 March 1981
BUY DJ 104	Jona Lewie	"Stop the Cavalry"	
BUY 104	Jona Lewie	"Stop the Cavalry"	21 November 1980
BUY DJ 105	Desmond Dekker	"Many Rivers to Cross"	
BUY 105	Desmond Dekker	"Many Rivers to Cross"	9 January 1981
BUY DJ 106	The London Cast of Oklahoma!	Oklahoma!	Custom promo label
BUY 106	The London Cast of Oklahoma!	Not issued	
BUY 107	Ian Dury & the Blockheads	Not issued	
BUY DJ 108	Madness	"The Return of the Los Palmas 7"	
BUY 108	Madness	"The Return of the Los Palmas 7"	16 January 1981
BUY DJ 109	Tenpole Tudor	"Swords of a Thousand Men"	
BUY 109	Tenpole Tudor	"Swords of a Thousand Men"	27 March 1981
BUY DJ 110	Jona Lewie	"Louise (We Get It Right)"	
BUY 110	Jona Lewie	"Louise (We Get It Right)"	24 April 1981
BUY DJ 111	Lonesome Tone	"Mum, Dad, Love, Hate and Elvis"	
BUY 111	Lonesome Tone	"Mum, Dad, Love, Hate and Elvis"	Not issued
BUY DJ 112	Madness	"Grey Day"	
BUY 112	Madness	"Grey Day"	17 April 1981
BUY DJ 113	The Equators	"If You Need Me"	
BUY 113	The Equators	"If You Need Me"	3 July 1981
BUY DJ 114	Bubba Lou and The Highballs	"Love All Over The Place"	
BUY 114	Bubba Lou and The Highballs	"Love All Over The Place"	Not issued
BUY DJ 115	John Otway	"The Turning Point"	
BUY 115	John Otway	"The Turning Point"	17 April 1981
BUY 116	Desmond Dekker	"We Can and We Will"	Not issued
BUY DJ 117	The Belle Stars	"Hiawatha"	
BUY 117	The Belle Stars	"Hiawatha"	12 June 1981
BUY DJ 118	Department S	"Going Left Right"	
BUY 118	Department S	"Going Left Right"	19 June 1981
BUY DJ 119	Any Trouble	"Trouble With Love"	
BUY 119	Any Trouble	"Trouble With Love"	29 June 1981
BUY DJ 120	Tenpole Tudor	"Wünderbar"	
BUY 120	Tenpole Tudor	"Wünderbar"	17 July 1981
BUY DJ 121	Sprout Head Uprising	"Throw Some Water In"	
BUY 121	Sprout Head Uprising	"Throw Some Water In"	10 July 1981
BUY DJ 122	Jona Lewie	"Shaggy Raggy"	
BUY 122	Jona Lewie	"Shaggy Raggy"	17 July 1981
BUY 123	The Belle Stars	"Slick Trick"	14 July 1981
BUY DJ 124	Alvin Stardust	"Pretend"	
BUY 124	Alvin Stardust	"Pretend"	14 August 1981
BUY DJ 125	Billy Bremner	"Loud Music In Cars"	
BUY 125	Billy Bremner	"Loud Music In Cars"	16 October 1981
BUY DJ 126	Madness	"Shut Up"	
BUY 126	Madness	"Shut Up"	18 September 1981
BUY 127	Any Trouble	"Dimming the Day"	Not issued
BUY DJ 128	Department S	"I Want"	
BUY 128	Department S	"I Want"	23 October 1981
BUY DJ 129	Tenpole Tudor	"Throw out the Baby With the Bath Water"	
BUY 129	Tenpole Tudor	"Throw out the Baby With the Bath Water"	30 October 1981
BUY DJ 130	The Belle Stars	"Another Latin Love Song"	
BUY 130	The Belle Stars	"Another Latin Love Song"	30 October 1981
BUY DJ 131	Jona Lewie	"Re-arranging the Deckchairs on the Titanic"	
BUY 131	Jona Lewie	"Re-arranging the Deckchairs on the Titanic"	20 November 1981
BUY DJ 132	Alvin Stardust	"A Wonderful Time Up There"	
BUY 132	Alvin Stardust	"A Wonderful Time Up There"	6 November 1981
BUY DJ 133	Cory Band and the Gwalia Singers	"Stop the Cavalry"	
BUY 133	Cory Band and the Gwalia Singers	"Stop the Cavalry"	20 November 1981
BUY DJ 134	Madness	"It Must Be Love"	
BUY 134	Madness	"It Must Be Love"	27 November 1981
BUY DJ 135	Ian Dury	"What a Waste"	
BUY 135	Ian Dury	"What a Waste"	18 November 1981
BUY DJ 136	The Dancing Did	"The Lost Platoon"	
BUY 136	The Dancing Did	"The Lost Platoon"	8 January 1982
BUY DJ 137	Tenpole Tudor	"Let the Four Winds Blow"	
BUY 137	Tenpole Tudor	"Let the Four Winds Blow"	12 February 1982
BUY DJ 138	Pookiesnackenburger	"Just One Cornetto"	
BUY 138	Pookiesnackenburger	"Just One Cornetto"	22 January 1982
BUY DJ 139	Jona Lewie	"I Think I'll Get My Hair Cut"	
BUY 139	Jona Lewie	"I Think I'll Get My Hair Cut"	29 January 1982
BUY DJ 140	Madness	"Cardiac Arrest"	
BUY 140	Madness	"Cardiac Arrest"	12 February 1982
BUY 141	Lene Lovich	Not issued	
BUY DJ 142	Alvin Stardust	"Weekend"	
BUY 142	Alvin Stardust	"Weekend"	9 April 1982
BUY DJ 143	Billy Bremner	"Laughter Turns to Tears"	
BUY 143	Billy Bremner	"Laughter Turns to Tears"	26 February 1982
BUY DJ 144	Desmond Dekker	"Book of Rules"	
BUY 144	Desmond Dekker	"Book of Rules"	April 1982
BUY DJ 145	The Astronauts	"I'm Your Astronaut"	
BUY 145	The Astronauts	"I'm Your Astronaut"	April 1982
BUY DJ 146	Madness	"House of Fun"	
BUY 146	Madness	"House of Fun"	14 May 1982
BUY DJ 147	Jane Aire	"I Close My Eyes and Count to Ten"	
BUY 147	Jane Aire	"I Close My Eyes and Count to Ten"	14 May 1982
BUY DJ 148	Electric Guitars	"Language Problems"	
BUY 148	Electric Guitars	"Language Problems"	21 May 1982
BUY DJ 149	Lene Lovich	"Lucky Number"	
BUY 149	Lene Lovich	"Lucky Number"	21 May 1982
BUY DJ 150	The Belle Stars	"Iko Iko"	
BUY 150	The Belle Stars	"Iko Iko"	21 May 1982
BUY DJ 151	Brigit Novik & M	Danube	
BUY 151	Brigit Novik & M	Danube	25 June 1982
BUY DJ 152	Alvin Stardust	"I Want You Back in My Life Again"	
BUY 152	Alvin Stardust	"I Want You Back in My Life Again"	July 1982
BUY DJ 153	Madness	"Driving in My Car"	
BUY 153	Madness	"Driving in My Car"	24 July 1982
BUY DJ 154	Sylvia and The Sapphires	"Shopping Around"	
BUY 154	Sylvia and The Sapphires	"Shopping Around"	July 1982
BUY DJ 155	The Belle Stars	"The Clapping Song"	
BUY 155	The Belle Stars	"The Clapping Song"	July 1982
BUY DJ 156	Albania	"Could This Be Love"	
BUY 156	Albania	"Could This Be Love"	September 1982
BUY DJ 157	Via Vagabond	"Who Likes Jazz?"	
BUY 157	Via Vagabond	"Who Likes Jazz?"	27 Aug 1982
BUY DJ 158	The Freshies	"Fasten Your Seat Belts"	
BUY 158	The Freshies	"Fasten Your Seat Belts"	3 September 1982
BUY DJ 159	The Belle Stars	"Mockingbird"	
BUY 159	The Belle Stars	"Mockingbird"	16 October 1982
BUY DJ 160	Alvin Stardust	"A Picture of You"	
BUY 160	Alvin Stardust	"A Picture of You"	November 1982
BUY 161	Electric Guitars	"Beat Me Hollow"	Not issued
BUY DJ 162	Sylvia and The Sapphires	"Baby I'm A Fool For You"	
BUY 162	Sylvia and The Sapphires	"Baby I'm A Fool For You"	29 October 1982
BUY DJ 163	Madness	"Our House"	
BUY 163	Madness	"Our House"	12 November 1982
BUY DJ 164	Lene Lovich	"It's You, Only You (Mein Schmerz)"	
BUY 164	Lene Lovich	"It's You, Only You (Mein Schmerz)"	October 1983
BUY 165	Not issued		
BUY DJ 166	Brigit Novik	"The Wedding Dance"	
BUY 166	Brigit Novik	"The Wedding Dance"	1 October 1982
BUY DJ 167	The Belle Stars	"Sign of the Times"	
BUY 167	The Belle Stars	"Sign of the Times"	30 December 1982
BUY DJ 168	Tracey Ullman	"Breakaway"	
BUY 168	Tracey Ullman	"Breakaway"	25 February 1983
BUY DJ 169	Madness	"Tomorrow's (Just Another Day)"	
BUY 169	Madness	"Tomorrow's (Just Another Day)"	1 February 1983
BUY DJ 170	Jona Lewie	"Love Detonator"	
BUY 170	Jona Lewie	"Love Detonator"	May 1983
BUY 171	Lene Lovich	"Maria"	Not issued
BUY DJ 172	The Tudors	"Tied Up With Lou Cool"	
BUY 172	The Tudors	"Tied Up With Lou Cool"	February 1983
BUY DJ 173	Evrol Campbell	"Nearest To My Heart"	
BUY 173	Evrol Campbell	"Nearest To My Heart"	February 1983
BUY DJ 174	The Belle Stars	"Sweet Memory"	
BUY 174	The Belle Stars	"Sweet Memory"	April 1983
BUY DJ 175	Language	"We're Celebrating"	
BUY 175	Language	"We're Celebrating"	March 1983
BUY DJ 176	Yello	"I Love You"	
BUY 176	Yello	"I Love You"	May 1983
BUY DJ 177	Edward Tudor-Pole	"The Hayrick Song"	
BUY 177	Edward Tudor-Pole	"The Hayrick Song"	20 May 1983
BUY DJ 178	Passion Puppets	"Like Dust"	
BUY 178	Passion Puppets	"Like Dust"	June 1983
BUY DJ 179	The Sapphires	"My Baby Must Be a Magician"	
BUY 179	The Sapphires	"My Baby Must Be a Magician"	29 April 1983
BUY DJ 180	Tracey Ullman	"They Don't Know"	
BUY 180	Tracey Ullman	"They Don't Know"	9 September 1983
BUY DJ 181	Madness	"Wings of a Dove"	
BUY 181	Madness	"Wings of a Dove"	20 August 1983
BUY DJ 182	Alvin Stardust	"Walk Away Renee"	
BUY 182	Alvin Stardust	"Walk Away Renee"	April 1983
BUY DJ 183	Jakko	"Dangerous Dreams"	
BUY 183	Jakko	"Dangerous Dreams"	May 1983
BUY DJ 184	Gibson Brothers	"My Heart's Beating Wild (Tic Tac Tic Tac)"	
BUY 184	Gibson Brothers	"My Heart's Beating Wild (Tic Tac Tic Tac)"	June 1983
BUY DJ 185	The Belle Stars	"Indian Summer"	
BUY 185	The Belle Stars	"Indian Summer"	July 1983
BUY 186	Desmond Dekker	"Hot City"	August 1983
BUY DJ 187	The Belle Stars	"The Entertainer"	
BUY 187	The Belle Stars	"The Entertainer"	September 1983
BUY DJ 188	Passion Puppets	"Voices"	
BUY 188	Passion Puppets	"Voices"	16 September 1983
BUY 189	King Kurt	"Destination Zululand"	October 1983
BUY DJ 190	Kirsty MacColl	"Terry"	
BUY 190	Kirsty MacColl	"Terry"	October 1983
BUY DJ 191	Yello	"Lost Again"	
BUY 191	Yello	"Lost Again"	October 1983
BUY DJ 192	Madness	"The Sun and the Rain"	
BUY 192	Madness	"The Sun and the Rain"	29 October 1983
BUY 193	The Inspirational Choir of the Pentecostal; First Born Church of the Living God	"Pick Me Up"	November 1983
BUY 194	Robert Sleigh	"First Snow"	November 1983
BUY DJ 195	Tracey Ullman	"Move Over Darling"	
BUY 195	Tracey Ullman	"Move Over Darling"	November 1983
BUY DJ 196	Madness	"Michael Caine"	
BUY 196	Madness	"Michael Caine"	30 January 1984
BUY 197	Tracey Ullman	"My Guy's Mad at Me"	February 1984
BUY DJ 198	Jakko	"Who's Fooling Who"	
BUY 198	Jakko	"Who's Fooling Who"	March 1984
BUY 199	King Kurt	"Mack the Knife"	April 1984
BUY DJ 200	The Belle Stars	"80's Romance"	
BUY 200	The Belle Stars	"80's Romance"	June 1984
BUY 201	Madness	"One Better Day"	2 June 1984
BUY 202	Personal Column	"Strictly Dancewise"	2 April 1984
BUY 203	Passion Puppets	"Beyond The Pale"	May 1984
BUY DJ 204	Jamie Rae	"She's The One"	
BUY 204	Jamie Rae	"She's The One"	June 1984
BUY DJ 205	Tracey Ullman	"Sunglasses"	
BUY 205	Tracey Ullman	"Sunglasses"	June 1984
BUY DJ 206	King Kurt	"Banana Banana"	
BUY 206	King Kurt	"Banana Banana"	July 1984
BUY 207	The Pogues	"Dark Streets of London"	June 1984
BUY DJ 208	Jakko	"I Can't Stand The Pressure"	
BUY 208	Jakko	"I Can't Stand The Pressure"	September 1984
BUY 209	The Catch	"25 Years"	July 1984
BUY 210	The Belle Stars	"Is This The Night"	Not issued
BUY 211	Tracey Ullman	"Helpless"	October 1984
BUY DJ 212	The Pogues	"Boys from the County Hell"	
BUY 212	The Pogues	"Boys from the County Hell"	October 1984
BUY 213	Not issued		
BUY DJ 214	Ian Dury	"Hit Me with Your Rhythm Stick"	
BUY 214	Ian Dury	"Hit Me with Your Rhythm Stick"	May 1985
BUY 215	Not issued		
BUY 216	Kirsty MacColl	"A New England"	December 1984
BUY DJ 217	Tracey Ullman	"Terry"	
BUY 217	Tracey Ullman	"Terry"	January 1985
BUY 218	Billy Connolly	"Super Gran"	February 1985
BUY DJ 219	Jamie Rae	"Pretty One"	
BUY 219	Jamie Rae	"Pretty One"	February 1985
BUY 220	The Pogues	"A Pair of Brown Eyes"	18 March 1985
BUY DJ 221	The Untouchables	"Free Yourself"	
BUY 221	The Untouchables	"Free Yourself"	April 1985
BUY 222	The Catch	"Find the Love"	April 1985
BUY 223	King Kurt	"Billy"	June 1985
BUY 224	The Pogues	"Sally MacLennane"	June 1985
BUY DJ 225	Kirsty MacColl	"He's on the Beach"	
BUY 225	Kirsty MacColl	"He's on the Beach"	June 1985
BUY 226	Not issued		
BUY 227	The Untouchables	"FBI (I Sky For)"	July 1985
BUY 228	Not issued		
BUY 229	The Pogues	"Dirty Old Town"	August 1985
BUY 230	King Kurt	"The Road to Rack and Ruin"	September 1985
BUY DJ 231	Bob Andrews	"Love Theme From Romeo & Juliet"	
BUY 231	Bob Andrews	"Love Theme From Romeo & Juliet"	
BUY DJ 232	Tracey Ullman	"Shattered"	
BUY 232	Tracey Ullman	"Shattered"	Not issued
BUY DJ 233	Phranc	"Amazon"	
BUY 233	Phranc	"Amazon"	November 1985
BUY DJ 234	Andy White	"Religious Persuasion"	
BUY 234	Andy White	"Religious Persuasion"	Not issued
BUY 235	King Kurt	"Slammers"	1985
BUY 236	Not issued		
BUY 237	Theatre of Hate	"The Hop"	Not issued
BUY DJ 238	The Damned	"New Rose" / "Neat Neat Neat"	
BUY 238	The Damned	"New Rose" / "Neat Neat Neat"	Not issued
BUY 239	Elvis Costello	"Less Than Zero" / "Alison"	Not issued
BUY 240	The Untouchables	"What's Gone Wrong"	November 1985
BUY 241	The Mint Juleps	"Only Love Can Break Your Heart"	February 1986
BUY 242	Bobby Tench	"Still in Love with You"	March 1986
BUY DJ 243	The Pogues	"A Rainy Night in Soho"	
BUY 243	The Pogues	"A Rainy Night in Soho"	February 1986
BUY 244	Not issued		
BUY 245	The Belle Stars	"World Domination"	April 1986
BUY 246	Dermot Morgan	"Thank You Very Much Mr. Eastwood (The Barry McGuigan Song)"	March 1986
BUY 247	Phranc	"The Lonesome Death of Hatty Carroll"	March 1986
BUY 248	Fire Next Time	"Beneath The Hammers"	March 1986
BUY 249	Rita Wolf	"My Beautiful Laundrette"	Not issued
BUY 250	Not issued		
BUY 251	Furniture	"Brilliant Mind"	April 1986
BUY 252	Andy Fairweather Low	"Bossa Nova"	August 1986
BUY 253	Dr. Feelgood	"Don't Wait Up"	August 1986
BUY 254	Furniture	"Love Your Shoes"	October 1986
BUY 255	Dr. Feelgood	"See You Later, Alligator"	10 November 1986
BUY 256	Tommy Chase	"Killer Joe (Right Cross)"	February 1987
BUY 257	The Mint Juleps	"Every Kinda People"	May 1987
BUY DJ 258	The Pogues and The Dubliners	"The Irish Rover"	
BUY 258	The Pogues and The Dubliners	"The Irish Rover"	March 1987
BUY 259	Dr. Feelgood	"Hunting Shooting Fishing"	22 May 1987
BUY 260	Not issued		
BUY 261	Not issued		
BUY 262	Not issued		
BUY DJ 263	The Mint Juleps	"Girl To The Power of 6"	
BUY 263	The Mint Juleps	"Girl To The Power of 6"	August 1987
BUY 265	The Enemy	"40 Days and 40 Nights"	6 November 2006
BUY 266	The Enemy	"It's Not OK"	12 February 2007
BUY 267	The Enemy	"Away from Here"	16 April 2007
BUYIT 268	Eskimo Disco	"What Is Woman?"	
BUYIT 268	Eskimo Disco	"What Is Woman?"	14 May 2007
BUY 269	The Displacements	"Frontline Hearts"	
BUY 269	The Displacements	"Frontline Hearts"	20 August 2007
BUY 270P	The Producers	"Barking Up the Right Tree"	
BUY 270	The Producers	"Barking Up the Right Tree"	20 August 2007
DBUY 271	Any Trouble	"That Sound"	17 September 2007
BUY 272	Jona Lewie	"Stop the Cavalry"	December 2008
BUY 273	The Displacements	"Lazy Bones"	17 December 2007
BUY 274	F. Lunaire	The Mondestrunken (E.P.)	25 February 2008
DBUY 275	Chris Difford	"Fat as a Fiddle"	7 April 2008
BUY 276	The Displacements	"Down and Out"	June 2008
BUY 277	Wreckless Eric & Amy Rigby	"Here Comes My Ship" (digital download)	3 September 2008
BUY 278	Henry Priestman	"Don't You Love Me No More" (digital download)	13 April 2009
BUY 279	Tenpole Tudor	"Swords of a Thousand Men" (digital download)	Not known
BUY 280	Jay Jay Pistolet	"Happy Birthday You"	November 2008
BUY 281	Henry Priestman	"Grey's the New Blonde" (digital download)	26 January 2009
BUY 282	Ou Est le Swimming Pool	"Dance the Way I Feel" (digital download)	Not known
BUY 283	Ou Est le Swimming Pool	"Dance the Way I Feel"	7 September 2009
BUY 284	Ou Est le Swimming Pool	"Dance the Way I Feel" (digital download-4 mixes)	Not known
BUY 285	Tenpole Tudor	"Swords of a Thousand Men" (digital download)	28 March 2012
BUY 286	Sam and the Womp	"Bom Bom" (digital download)	20 August 2012
BUY 287	Kirsty MacColl	"A New England"	20 April 2013
BUY 288	Sam and the Womp	"Ravo" (digital download)	18 August 2013
BUY 289	Various artists	Ten Big Stiffs	29 November 2013
BUY 290	Tenpole Tudor	"Swords of a Thousand Men"	19 April 2014
BUY series of singles not issued		Percentage of BUY series of singles that charted	
31		23.4% (62 out of 259 general releases)	
Certification		BUY series of singles	
Silver disc		15	
Gold disc		6	
Platinum disc		1	

SEEZ Catalogue Series of Albums
Catalogue No.	Artist	Album	Release date
SEEZ 1	The Damned	Damned Damned Damned	18 February 1977
SEEZ 2	Various artists	A Bunch of Stiff Records	1 April 1977
SEEZ 3	Elvis Costello	My Aim Is True	29 July 1977
SEEZ 4	Ian Dury	New Boots and Panties!!	30 September 1977
SEEZ 5	The Damned	Music for Pleasure	25 November 1977
SEEZ 6	Wreckless Eric	Wreckless Eric	31 March 1978
SEEZ 7	Lene Lovich	Stateless	13 October 1978
SEEZ 8	Jona Lewie	On the Other Hand There's a Fist	13 October 1978
SEEZ 9	Wreckless Eric	The Wonderful World of Wreckless Eric	13 October 1978
SEEZ 10	Mickey Jupp	Jupanese	13 October 1978
SEEZ 11	Jane Aire And The Belvederes	Jane Aire And The Belvederes	Not issued
SEEZ 12	Rachel Sweet	Fool Around	13 October 1978
SEEZ 13	The Rumour	Frogs Sprouts Clogs and Krauts	2 March 1979
SEEZ 14	Ian Dury & the Blockheads	Do It Yourself	18 May 1979
SEEZ 15	The Sports	Don't Throw Stones	Not issued
SEEZ 16	Lew Lewis Reformer	Save the Wail	8 June 1979
SEEZ 17	Madness	One Step Beyond...	26 October 1979
SEEZ 18	Rachel Sweet	Protect the Innocent	15 March 1980
SEEZ 19	Lene Lovich	Flex	18 January 1980
SEEZ 20	The Feelies	Crazy Rhythms	7 March 1980
SEEZ 21	Wreckless Eric	Big Smash!	29 February 1980
SEEZ 22	Dirty Looks	Dirty Looks	15 August 1980
SEEZ 23	Graham Parker & the Rumour	The Up Escalator	23 May 1980
SEEZ 24	The Plasmatics	New Hope for the Wretched	3 October 1980
SEEZ 25	Any Trouble	Where Are All the Nice Girls?	11 July 1980
SEEZ 26	Desmond Dekker	Black And Dekker	25 July 1980
SEEZ 27	The Rumour	Purity Of Essence	29 August 1980
SEEZ 28	Joe "King" Carrasco & the Crowns	Joe "King" Carrasco & the Crowns	10 October 1980
SEEZ 29	Madness	Absolutely	26 September 1980
SEEZ 30	Ian Dury & the Blockheads	Laughter	18 November 1980
SEEZ 31	Tenpole Tudor	Eddie, Old Bob, Dick and Gary	17 April 1981
SEEZ 32	Larry Wallis	Leather Forever	Not issued
SEEZ 33	Various artists	Son of Stiff	Not issued
SEEZ 34	Lene Lovich	No Man's Land	Not issued
SEEZ 35	The Equators	Hot	17 July 1981
SEEZ 36	Desmond Dekker	Compass Point	18 August 1981
SEEZ 37	Any Trouble	Wheels in Motion	7 August 1981
SEEZ 38	Dirty Looks	Turn it Up	28 August 1981
SEEZ 39	Madness	7	2 October 1981
SEEZ 40	Jona Lewie	Heart Skips Beat	8 December 1982
SEEZ 41	Ian Dury & the Blockheads	Jukebox Dury	20 November 1981
SEEZ 42	Tenpole Tudor	Let the Four Winds Blow	20 November 1981
SEEZ 43	Alvin Stardust	A Picture of You	Not issued
SEEZ 44	Lene Lovich	No Man's Land	13 November 1982
SEEZ 45	The Belle Stars	The Belle Stars	January 1983
SEEZ 46	Madness	The Rise & Fall	8 October 1982
SEEZ 47	Not issued		
SEEZ 48	Yello	You Gotta Say Yes to Another Excess	June 1983
SEEZ 49	Not issued		
SEEZ 50	Not issued		
SEEZ 51	Tracey Ullman	You Broke My Heart in 17 Places	October 1983
SEEZ 52	King Kurt	Ooh Wallah Wallah	December 1983
SEEZ 53	Madness	Keep Moving	20 February 1984
SEEZ 54	Passion Puppets	Beyond the Pale	March 1983
SEEZ 55	The Pogues	Red Roses for Me	October 1984
SEEZ 56	Tracey Ullman	You Caught Me Out	November 1984
SEEZ 57	The Untouchables	Wild Child	13 July 1985
SEEZ 58	The Pogues	Rum Sodomy & the Lash	5 August 1985
SEEZ 59	Tracey Ullman	Forever – The Best of Tracey Ullman	November 1985
SEEZ 60	Phranc	Folksinger	13 November 1985
SEEZ 61	The Roys	Kicked Off The Train	February 1986
SEEZ 62	King Kurt	Big Cock	February 1986
SEEZ 63	Not issued		
SEEZ 64	Furniture	The Wrong People	November 1986
SEEZ 65	Dr. Feelgood	Brilleaux	August 1986
SEEZ 66	Tommy Chase	Groove Merchant	May 1987
SEEZ 67	Dr. Feelgood	Classic	October 1987
SEEZ 68	The Tranzmitors	The Tranzmitors	27 August 2007
SEEZ 69	Any Trouble	Life in Reverse	10 September 2007
SEEZ 70	The Producers	The Producers	Not issued
SEEZ 71	Chris Difford	I Didn't Get Where I Am (digital download)	2007
SEEZ 72	Chris Difford	The Last Temptation of Chris	7 April 2008
SEEZ 73	Wreckless Eric & Amy Rigby	Wreckless Eric & Amy Rigby	22 September 2008
SEEZ 74	Henry Priestman	The Chronicles of Modern Life	29 September 2008
SEEZ 75	Kirsty MacColl	Desperate Character (digital download)	23 July 2021
SEEZ 76	Kirsty MacColl	The Stiff Singles Collection (digital download)	1 August 2021
SEEZ series of albums not issued		Percentage of SEEZ series of albums that charted	
11		35.4% (23 out of 65 released)	
Certification		SEEZ series of albums	
Silver disc		6	
Gold disc		4	
Platinum disc		3	

== See also ==
- Music recording sales certification
- List of music recording certifications
- British Phonographic Industry
- Official Charts Company
