= Hits Greatest Stiffs =

Greatest hits album by Various Artists
- Released: 16 September 1977
- Recorded: Various times
- Genre: New wave
- Label: Stiff; FIST 1

Stiff Record Compilations chronology
A Bunch of Stiff Records (1977)	Hits Greatest Stiffs (1977)	Live Stiffs Live (1978)

Hits Greatest Stiffs is a various artists compilation album, drawn from ten of the first eleven Stiff Records singles, BUY 1 to BUY 11.

The tracks follow the numerical order of the singles, but feature mostly the B-sides, although several singles were originally issued as double A-sides. The other sides of the Motörhead and Elvis Costello tracks had appeared on the previous compilation album, A Bunch of Stiff Records. The missing single from the sequence (BUY 10) was "Neat Neat Neat"/"Stab Your Back"/"Singalongascabies" by the Damned whereas both sides of the Tyla Gang's single were included on this album.

The inner sleeve included pictures of numerous artists, such as Abba and Tom Petty, who appeared on other labels. Although some thought this was some form of slight, they were shown because Stiff admired them, despite their being on other labels. The album did not enter the UK charts. However, it featured some of the most influential recording artists of the new wave era.

== Release history ==
Issued as an LP (FIST 1) on 16 September 1977, it was also issued on Cassette (ZFIST 1) on 22 October 1977. It has not been re-released on CD.

Initial copies of the LP included a free copy of the next single, BUY 12, Max Wall's "England's Glory"/"Dream Tobacco".

== Track listing ==
1. Nick Lowe – "Heart Of The City" – (B-side of BUY 1 "So It Goes")
2. Pink Fairies – "Between The Lines" – (A-side of BUY 2)
3. Roogalator – "Cincinnati Fatback" – (B-side of BUY 3 "All Aboard")
4. Tyla Gang – "Styrofoam" – (A-side of BUY 4)
5. Tyla Gang – "Texas Chainsaw Massacre Boogie" – (B-side of BUY 4)
6. Lew Lewis – "Caravan Man" – (B-side of BUY 5 "Boogie on the Street")
7. The Damned – "Help!" – (B-side of BUY 6 "New Rose")
8. Richard Hell – "You Gotta Lose" – (B-side of BUY 7 "Another World"/"Blank Generation")
9. Plummet Airlines – "This Is The World" – (B-side of BUY 8 "Silver Shirt")
10. Motörhead – "Leaving Here" (A-side of BUY 9 [B-side "White Line Fever"])
11. Elvis Costello – "Radio Sweetheart" (B-side of BUY 11 "Less Than Zero")

== See also ==
- Stiff Records discography
