= Where Are All the Nice Girls? =

Studio album by Any Trouble
- Released: 1980
- Studio: Pennine Sound Studios, Oldham
- Label: Stiff
- Producer: John Wood

Any Trouble chronology
| Where Are All the Nice Girls? (1980) | Wheels in Motion (1981) |

Where Are All the Nice Girls? is the debut studio album by English band Any Trouble, released in 1980 by Stiff Records.

The album was produced by John Wood and the band gained significant visibility after featuring on a Melody Maker front cover and in a very positive article by Allan Jones.

== Reception ==
Professional ratings
Review scores
| Source | Rating |
|---|---|
| AllMusic | 4.5/5 stars |
| Christgau's Record Guide | C+ |
| Record Collector | 4/5 stars |

Although the album did not chart at the time, it later achieved critical recognition. AllMusic said "more than 20 years after its release, Any Trouble's debut still sounds fresh, engaging, and exciting, packed with sharp tunes, clever observations". Record Collector called it a "sprightly debut" and "a worthy selection to spearhead the first wave of records heralding the label’s relaunch." Trouser Press, however, called them "a pub band five years after the end of that era, playing competent, melodic rock with no special character."

== Track listing ==
All tracks composed by Clive Gregson; except where indicated

1. "Second Choice"
2. "Playing Bogart" (Nick Simpson)
3. "No Idea"
4. "Foolish Pride"
5. "Nice Girls"
6. "Turning Up the Heat"
7. "Growing Up" (Bruce Springsteen)
8. "Romance"
9. "The Hurt"
10. "Girls Are Always Right"
11. "Honolulu"
12. "(Get You Off) The Hook"
13. "Name of the Game (Live)" (Benny Andersson, Björn Ulvaeus, Stig Anderson)

== Personnel ==
Any Trouble

- Clive Gregson - lead vocals, guitar, keyboards
- Chris Parks - guitar
- Phil Barnes - bass guitar, backing vocals
- Mel Harley - drums

with:

- Alison Tulloch, Diane Robinson - backing vocals
