= A Bunch of Stiff Records =

Compilation album by Various Artists
- Released: April 1, 1977
- Recorded: Various times
- Genre: New wave
- Label: Stiff; SEEZ2

Stiff Record Compilations chronology
A Bunch of Stiff Records (1977)	Hits Greatest Stiffs (1977)

Professional ratings
Review scores
Source	Rating
Allmusic	4/5 stars

A Bunch of Stiff Records, also known as A Bunch of Stiffs, is a various artists album to promote some of the first acts to be signed by Stiff Records. It is subtitled Undertakers to the Industry – If They're Dead - We'll Sign 'Em.

One of the tracks, Elvis Costello's "Less Than Zero", had been issued as single only a week prior to this album being released, although this is an unusual and otherwise-unavailable mix of the song, which has keyboards overdubbed over the intro. Motörhead's "White Line Fever" had been scheduled for release in December 1976, but the issue was cancelled. Wreckless Eric's "(I'd Go The) Whole Wide World" was issued as a single in August 1977.

The album did not enter the UK charts.

Graham Parker's track (No. 6, the final track on side 1 of the LP) was not listed on the original release, probably due to his contract with Phonogram, for whose Vertigo label he and the Rumour had already released two LPs.

The album was designed by Barney Bubbles (uncredited, as was his usual practice).

== Track listing ==
No.	Title	Writer(s)	Artist	Length
1.	"I Love My Label"	Nick Lowe	Nick Lowe	3:01
2.	"(I'd Go The) Whole Wide World"	Wreckless Eric	Wreckless Eric	2:52
3.	"White Line Fever"	Eddie Clarke, Ian Kilmister, Phil Taylor	Motörhead	2:50
4.	"Less Than Zero"	Elvis Costello	Elvis Costello	3:19
5.	"Little by Little"	Magic Michael	Magic Michael	3:53
6.	"Back to Schooldays"	Graham Parker	Graham Parker	2:57
7.	"Jump for Joy"	Martin Stone	Stones Masonry	–
8.	"Maybe"	Richard Barrett	Jill Read	2:50
9.	"Jo Jo Gunne"	Chuck Berry	Dave Edmunds	5:00
10.	"The Young Lords"	Sean Tyla	Tyla Gang	3:33
11.	"Food"	C. Kid	The Takeaways	3:36

== See also ==
- Stiff Records discography
