= Wrong End of the Race =

Studio album by Any Trouble
- Released: 1984
- Genre: Rock
- Label: EMI America
- Producer: Will Birch, John Wood

Any Trouble chronology
Any Trouble (1983)	Wrong End of the Race (1984)	Girls Are Always Right: The Stiff Years (2002)

Wrong End of the Race is the final studio album by the English band Any Trouble, released in 1984. The original LP release was a double album. The band supported it with UK and North American tours.

== Production ==
Recorded in New York and London, the album was produced by Will Birch and John Wood. "Baby, Now That I've Found You", released as a single, is a cover of the song made famous by the Foundations. "Learning the Game" was written by Buddy Holly. The rest of the songs were written by bandmembers Clive Gregson and Nick Simpson. "Open Fire", "Playing Bogart", "Turning Up the Heat", and "Yesterday's Love" are remakes of older Any Trouble songs. Gregson was influenced primarily by Richard Thompson, who sang and played guitar on "Lucky Day", "Open Fire", and "Baby, Now That I've Found You". Any Trouble used a horn section and strings on some of the tracks. "Lovers Moon" features Cajun music-inspired accordion and fiddle. The Sutherland Brothers provided backing vocals on a few tracks.

== Critical reception ==
Professional ratings
Review scores
Source	Rating
AllMusic	3/5 stars
The Birmingham News	5/5 stars
The Encyclopedia of Popular Music	3/5 stars
The Philadelphia Inquirer	4/5 stars
Santa Barbara News & Review	3/5 stars

The Philadelphia Inquirer praised "Gregson's knack for writing bracing pop-rock anthems inspired by the likes of Bruce Springsteen and English guitarist Richard Thompson." The Sunday Telegraph called Wrong End of the Race "the best LP of the year so far", and noted that the band "achieve the perfect punchy sound to complement Gregson's irresistible, up-tempo beat numbers". The Press labeled the album "a near flawless example of mainstream rock sonics." The Birmingham Post said of Gregson, "not since Elvis Costello ... has there been such a lyrically incisive personality." The Birmingham Evening Mail opined that the "superior, soul-inspired rock" should have been limited to a single disc. The Birmingham News admired Gregson's "powerful, deep-chested singing voice."

Trouser Press concluded that the album "is less stylized than its remarkable predecessor, but bristles with renewed vigor and rich horn-and-vocal-filled arrangements." In 2005, the Iowa City Press-Citizen said that "this tour-de-force swansong threw aside any attempts to suck-up to industry conventions to make one of the most eclectic and tuneful works of its era."

== Track listing ==
No.	Title	Length
1.	"Open Fire"
2.	"Old Before Your Time"
3.	"Lovers Moon"
4.	"Lucky Day"
5.	"Coming of Age"
6.	"Baby, Now That I've Found You"
7.	"All the Time in the World"
8.	"Wheels in Motion"
9.	"Turning Up the Heat"
10.	"Yesterday's Love"
11.	"Wrong End of the Race"
12.	"Learning the Game"
13.	"Like a Man"
14.	"Playing Bogart"
15.	"Eleventh Hour"
16.	"The Cheating Kind"
17.	"Snapshot"
18.	"Between the Black and the Grey"
19.	"Kid Gloves"
