= Darryl Hunt (musician) =

English musician (1950–2022)

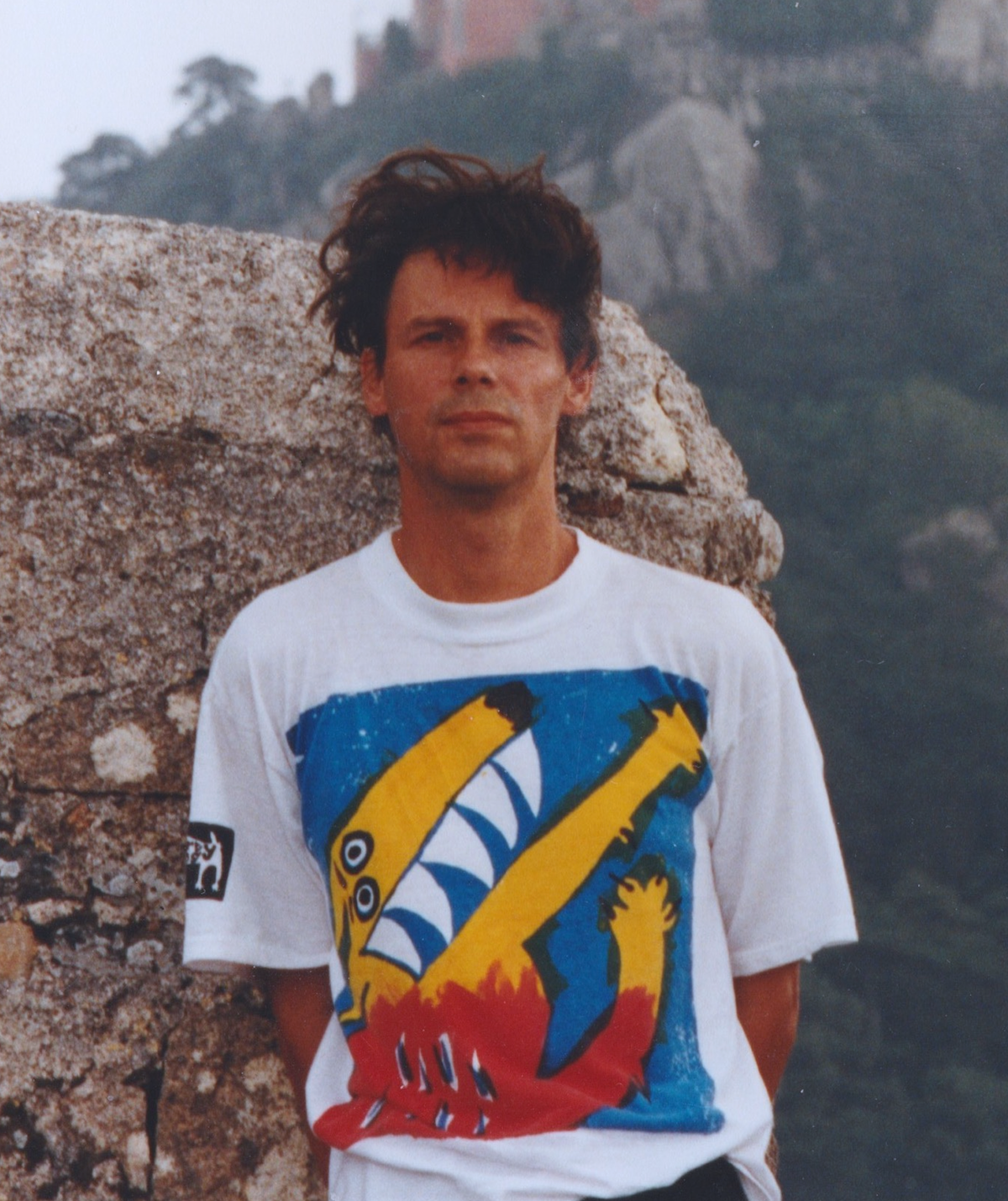

Background information
- Born: Darryl Gatwick Hunt; 4 May 1950
- Origin: Christchurch, England
- Died: 8 August 2022 (aged 72) London, England
- Genres: Celtic punk; folk punk
- Occupations: Musician; singer; songwriter
- Instruments: Bass; vocals
- Years active: 1973–2022
- Labels: Warner Bros.

Darryl Gatwick Hunt (4 May 1950 – 8 August 2022) was an English musician and singer-songwriter, who was best known for playing bass guitar in the Pogues.

== Early life ==
Hunt was born in Christchurch, Hampshire (now Dorset), England, on 4 May 1950. He was educated at Allhallows College in Lyme Regis, Devon and went on to study at Nottingham Trent University, where he earned a BA in fine art.

== Early career ==
At university, he made his first musical foray with The Brothel Creepers, a band formed for a student movie in 1973. This group evolved into the five-piece pub rock band Plummet Airlines in 1974, releasing two singles and an album before breaking up in 1977.

By the early 1980s, Hunt was DJing and playing with various groups in London at The Pindar Of Wakefield and elsewhere in the capital. He produced a one-off music fanzine, "Haywire", relating to the club nights at The Pindar Of Wakefield.

He was in the punk rock band The Favourites, and a pop band known as The Lemons, who released a single 7-inch on Coventry-based Race Records in 1981. He performed in a band, Crazeology, who were supported at least once by Pogue Mahone. Another band, Baby Lotion, morphed into lounge act Pride Of The Cross with the addition of Pogue Cait O'Riordan on vocals. Phil Gaston was a supporter of the band, ultimately writing for and producing their only release, a posthumously-released 7-inch single. However, the band came to an end as The Pogues' popularity increased, leaving O'Riordan unavailable. Hunt and Baby Lotion/Pride of the Cross guitarist Dave Scott then started a new group called The Troubleshooters, which included Debsey Wykes as singer and songwriter. Hunt also performed in a short-lived duo with Gaston called Pearl & Dean, whose material included a song called "The Ballad Of Pogue Mahone", a satirical overview of the members of Pogue Mahone set to the tune of The Old Orange Flute.

== The Pogues ==
Already familiar with the band and having helped them out with rides to gigs in his van, Hunt joined The Pogues as driver, front-of-house sound engineer and road manager for an Autumn 1984 UK/Ireland tour supporting Elvis Costello. This would quickly become a full-time job, putting an end to his other projects.

Hunt began playing bass in The Pogues in September 1986 after the departure of Cait O'Riordan, and remained their bass player and occasional songwriter for the rest of the band's career. His song "Love You Till The End" appears on the album Pogue Mahone and was used in the credits of the Jay Roach film Mystery, Alaska and used throughout the Richard LaGravenese film P.S. I Love You.

After The Pogues initial break-up in 1996, he briefly continued working with Spider Stacy and Andrew Ranken in The Vendettas. He joined The Pogues reunion in 2001, continuing to play with them through to their 2014 dissolution in the wake of Philip Chevron's death, and also participated in a Plummet Airlines reunion. In the early 2000s, Hunt founded the indie pop band Bish, ultimately releasing three albums of songs he wrote and produced.

== Additional works ==
In November 2021, Hunt sold the 1963 Fender Precision Bass that he had used for most of his career with The Pogues via Bonhams auction house in London.

== Death ==
Hunt died in London on 8 August 2022 at the age of 72.

== General references ==
- Clerk, Carol (2009). Kiss My Arse: The Story of the Pogues. Omnibus Press. ISBN 9780857120199.
