= Live Stiffs Live =

Live album by various artists
- Released: 17 February 1978
- Recorded: 3 October – 5 November 1977
- Venue: University of East Anglia, Leicester University, and Lyceum London
- Genre: Rock, new wave
- Label: Stiff
- Producer: Tim Summerhayes, Mick Crickmer

Stiff Record Compilations chronology
Hits Greatest Stiffs (1977)	Live Stiffs Live (1978)	The Stiff Records Box Set (1992)

Music for Pleasure re-issue cover

Professional ratings
Review scores
Source	Rating
AllMusic	4.5/5 stars
Christgau's Record Guide	B+

Live Stiffs Live is a live album released in 1978 by Stiff Records. It compiles concert performances by several of the record label's artists recorded during the "Live Stiffs Tour", which ran from 3 October to 5 November 1977.

== Songs ==
Among the recording artists featured on the album are Elvis Costello and the Attractions, Ian Dury & the Blockheads, Nick Lowe, Wreckless Eric, and Larry Wallis. The album opens with tour MC (and later Clash road manager) Kosmo Vinyl calling audience members away from the bar and introducing the first act as "Nick Lowe's Led Zeppelin". The final cut of the album is a performance of Ian Dury's hit, "Sex & Drugs & Rock & Roll" performed by all of the tour's artists and crew.

== Release ==
The album has been known by various names including Stiffs Live Stiffs, Stiffs Live and Live Stiffs. The name of the original Stiff Records release on 17 February 1978 was Live Stiffs Live. The album was later re-issued on Music for Pleasure (MFP 50445) as simply Live Stiffs.

The album entered the UK Albums Chart on 11 March 1980, eventually peaking at number 28.

It was released by Demon Records on CD in 1994 (Demon 621) and re-released in 1997 as (Edsel 621 & Diablo Records 851).

== Critical reception ==
Reviewing in Christgau's Record Guide: Rock Albums of the Seventies (1981), Robert Christgau wrote:

Elvis the C provides a brand new existentialist pronunciamento, 'I Just Don't Know What to Do With Myself,' but the real threat there is Nick Lowe's 'Let's Eat,' which garnishes a hot-and-greasy Mitch Ryder organ pump with lyrics like 'I wanna move move move move move my teeth' and 'Let's buy two and get one for free.' Filling out the good side are 'I Knew the Bride' (Lowe's answer to 'You Never Can Tell'), Larry Wallis's 'Police Car' (grand theft automatic), and two cuts by Wreckless Eric that seem unlikely to be eclipsed by their studio versions. Unfortunately, Costello's live 'Miracle Man' and the three Ian Dury performances were eclipsed before they came out.

In a retrospective review, AllMusic's Stephen Thomas Erlewine said "the entire record captures the wild, careening spirit of Stiff — it's fun, trashy rock & roll."

== Track listing ==
=== Side one ===
1. "I Knew the Bride" (Nick Lowe) - Nick Lowe's Last Chicken in the Shop - 3.25
2. "Let's Eat" (Lowe) - Nick Lowe's Last Chicken in the Shop - 2.44
3. "Semaphore Signals" (Wreckless Eric) - Wreckless Eric & the New Rockets - 3.25
4. "Reconnez Cherie" (Eric) - Wreckless Eric & the New Rockets - 3.45
5. "Police Car" (Larry Wallis) - Larry Wallis' Psychedelic Rowdies - 3.59

=== Side two ===
1. "I Just Don't Know What to Do with Myself" (Burt Bacharach, Hal David) - Elvis Costello & the Attractions - 2.27
2. "Miracle Man" (Elvis Costello) - Elvis Costello & the Attractions - 3.56
3. "Billericay Dickie" (Ian Dury) - Ian Dury & the Blockheads - 4.24
4. "Wake Up & Make Love with Me" (Dury) - Ian Dury & the Blockheads - 3.32
5. "Sex Drugs Rock & Roll & Chaos" (Dury) - All artists - 5.41

== Personnel ==
Nick Lowe's Last Chicken in the Shop (side one, tracks 1 & 2)

- Nick Lowe - bass, vocals
- Larry Wallis - guitar
- Terry Williams - drums
- Pete Thomas - drums
- Dave Edmunds - guitar
- Penny Tobin - keyboards

Wreckless Eric & the New Rockets (side one, tracks 3 & 4)

- Wreckless Eric - guitar, vocals
- Davey Payne - saxophone
- Denise Roudette - bass
- Ian Dury - drums

Larry Wallis' Psychedelic Rowdies (side one, track 5)

- Larry Wallis - guitar, vocals
- Nick Lowe - bass
- Penny Tobin - keyboards
- Terry Williams - drums
- Pete Thomas - drums

Elvis Costello & the Attractions (side two, tracks 1 & 2)

- Elvis Costello - vocals, guitar
- Steve Nieve - keyboards
- Bruce Thomas - bass
- Pete Thomas - drums

Ian Dury & the Blockheads (side two, tracks 3 & 4)

- Ian Dury - vocals
- John Turnbull - guitar
- Charley Charles - drums
- Norman Watt-Roy - bass
- Chaz Jankel - guitar
- Mickey Gallagher - keyboards
- Davey Payne - saxophone

== See also ==
- Stiff Records discography
