= Any Trouble =

British rock band

Background information
- Origin: Crewe, England
- Genres: New wave, pop rock
- Years active: 1975–1984, 2007–present
- Labels: Stiff, EMI America, Cherry Red
- Members: Clive Gregson; Mark Griffiths; Martin Hughes; Chris Parks
- Past members: Phil Barnes; Andy Ebsworth; Stephen Patrick M. Tom Jackson; Mel Harley

Any Trouble are a British rock band, originating from Crewe, England, best known for their early 1980s recordings.

In 1980, Melody Maker stated that Any Trouble were "the most exciting new rock 'n' roll group since the Pretenders".

== Early days ==
Any Trouble's founding members Clive Gregson (guitar), Tom Jackson (vocals) and Chris Parks (guitar) met at Crewe and Alsager Teacher Training College in 1974. Soon after, Mel Harley (drums) and Phil Barnes (bass) completed the lineup.

Initially Any Trouble were a covers band, playing anything they liked, including songs by Bob Dylan, The Band and a selection of American rock and roll numbers. With the advent of punk rock and then new wave, Gregson realised they needed a change of material. He explained in a 1999 interview, "We were like a human jukebox and it was obvious to me then if we wanted to get anywhere we needed original songs. I started to take it a bit more seriously then".

After vocalist Tom Jackson left, the band was fronted by Gregson. Any Trouble released the Gregson composition "Yesterday's Love" as an indie single in 1979. This was picked up by some radio stations and was played by BBC Radio 1 DJs John Peel, Andy Peebles and others in the UK.

== Signed to Stiff Records ==
Airplay for Any Trouble's debut indie single "Yesterday's Love" led to interest from major record labels including WEA, Chrysalis, EMI and Stiff. Any Trouble selected Stiff "because they were our kind of people".

Their first release on the Stiff label, Where Are All the Nice Girls? was perhaps their most successful. The album was produced by John Wood (Fairport Convention etc.) and the band gained significant visibility after featuring on a Melody Maker front cover and in a gushing article by Allan Jones. In some ways the band's career never recovered from this early rush of success and Gregson's singing was unfairly compared to that of Elvis Costello and Ian Dury.

The band's second album Wheels in Motion, with Martin Hughes replacing Mel Harley on drums, was produced by Mike Howlett; it would be the last recorded on the Stiff label in Any Trouble's original incarnation.

Despite frequent touring and the release of Wheels in Motion, Any Trouble's record sales failed to grow. The band were dropped by Stiff during a 1983 US tour supporting Ian Hunter, with their manager arranging for them to open for Molly Hatchet to help keep them afloat. At that point Clive Gregson "pulled my plug... threw in the towel... we straggled back to NYC, where our van was robbed whilst we were in the Stiff offices trying to wrestle return tickets to the UK out of the office manager". The band flew back to the UK on standby tickets.

== Move to EMI America and break-up ==
After returning from their US tour without a recording contract Any Trouble took a long break, after which Gregson returned to making demos. He had a meeting with Ray Williams who persuaded him Any Trouble had a sufficient following to justify its revival and took on the role of manager. Gregson re-formed the band and, on the strength of the demos, Williams secured a contract with Gery Gersh at EMI America.

Any Trouble's new line-up included Andy Ebsworth on drums and Steve Gurl on keyboards, with original members Gregson and Barnes. The sessions started promisingly enough with Val Garay (The Motels) as producer but Garay left after contract negotiations broke down. David Kershenbaum (best known for producing Joe Jackson and, later, Tracy Chapman) was brought on board to produce the band's eponymous third album but they were unhappy with the synthesizer-heavy sound of the final mix. While they toured the UK to support the album there were no funds available from the record company for a US tour; the album failed to chart on either side of the Atlantic.

Gregson decided to throw everything into Any Trouble's second effort for EMI America, producing an ambitious double album (an 11-track single LP in the US) that featured a mixture of new and previously recorded material to highlight the band's diverse range. The new release, titled Wrong End of the Race, also failed to chart despite support from the record company. After the failure of their second EMI album, Gregson broke the band up again. He recorded a solo album and joined Richard Thompson's band for a time before starting a successful folk-rock duo with Christine Collister in the mid-1980s, on the dissolution of which he resumed his solo career in 1992. Gregson has also toured and recorded in various combinations of musicians, including Boo Hewerdine, Eddi Reader, Nanci Griffith, Andy Roberts, Ian Matthews and Dennis Locorriere. Andy Ebsworth was one of the members of Ryder, the purpose-made pop group which represented the United Kingdom at the 1986 Eurovision Song Contest.

== Re-formation ==
In 2007, following the re-release of several Any Trouble albums on CD, the group reformed with the Wheels in Motion line-up of Clive Gregson, guitarist Chris Parks, bassist Phil Barnes and drummer Martin Hughes. After playing a few live gigs, Barnes had to bow out of the reformed group due to other commitments.

With Mark Griffiths as a session musician on bass, the revived group recorded a new album which was released on the reborn Stiff Records label on 10 September 2007. The album was titled Life in Reverse and featured thirteen new Gregson-penned songs. It was produced by John Wood, and had unique artwork by the Stiff Records designer Tobbe Stuhre. The band played a headlining reunion gig at the Jazz Cafe in London, England to support the release.

After another period of inactivity, in November 2013 Cherry Red Records released the 3-CD set The Complete Stiff Recordings 1980-81, comprising the band's first two studio albums with assorted singles and B-sides, plus the Live at the Venue album, packaged in mini-sleeves. The band supported this by re-forming to perform a one-off gig at London's 229 Club. By now, Griffiths was a full official member, and the line-up consisted of Gregson, Parks, Griffith and Hughes.

Any Trouble stayed together in 2014 to record the new album Present Tense and played a short tour in England in December 2014, which included Band on the Wall, Manchester, on 2 December 2014, dates in Newcastle, Birmingham and the 229 Club in London; they also played at the Purple Weekend Festival, in León, Spain. Present Tense was released in November 2015 featuring 18 new songs written by Gregson.

== Band members ==
=== Current members ===
- Clive Gregson (vocals, guitar & keyboards)
- Mark Griffiths (bass)
- Martin Hughes (drums)
- Chris Parks (guitar)

=== Former members ===
- Phil Barnes (bass)
- Andy Ebsworth (drums)
- Steve Gurl (keyboards)
- Tom Jackson (vocals)
- Mel Harley (drums)

=== Members' current work ===
- Phil Barnes worked producing music videos for bands such as Oasis and now produces TV adverts.
- Andy Ebsworth is now a music technology lecturer at Croydon College, England.
- Clive Gregson is still a full-time musician, touring countries including the UK, France, Germany, the Netherlands, Norway and Japan. He formed a new band The Guilty Men in 2022.
- Mel Harley runs a design and marketing company and property business.
- Tom Jackson worked with Clive Gregson again in the Oatcake Brothers. He then left the music business and went into social work.
- Chris Parks is now working in the UK as a music software developer.

== Discography ==
=== Albums ===
- Where Are All the Nice Girls? (1980, reissued in 2007), Stiff Records (produced by John Wood, Any Trouble, Bob Sargeant)
- Wheels in Motion (1981), Stiff Records (produced by Mike Howlett)
- Any Trouble (1983), EMI America (produced by David Kershenbaum)
- Wrong End of the Race (1984), EMI America (produced by John Wood & Will Birch)
- Life in Reverse (2007), Stiff Records (produced by John Wood)
- Present Tense (2015), Cherry Red

==== Live albums ====
- Live at the Venue (1981), Teldec (Germany only) (produced by Barry ‘Bazza’ Farmer)

==== Compilations ====
- Girls Are Always Right - The Stiff Years (2002), Cherry Red (produced by Any Trouble, John Wood, Bazza, Bob Sargeant, Mike Howlett, Martin Levan)
- The Complete Stiff Years (2013), Cherry Red

=== Singles ===
- "Yesterday's Love" (7") (1980), Stiff Records
- "Second Choice" (7") (1980), Stiff Records
- "Girls Are Always Right" (7") (1980), Stiff Records
- "Dimming of the Day"/"Another Heartache" (7", France only) (1981), Stiff Records
- "Trouble with Love" (7") (1981), Stiff Records
- "Touch and Go" (7") (1983), EMI America
- "I'll Be Your Man" (7") (1983), EMI America
- "Baby Now That I've Found You" (1984), EMI America
- "Open Fire" (7") (1984), EMI America
- "That Sound" (CDr) (2007), Stiff Records
