= Plummet Airlines =

British rock band

- Origin: Nottingham, England
- Genres: Rock, pub rock country rock
- Years active: 1973–1977
- Past members: Harry Stephenson; Richard Booth; Darryl Hunt; Simon Bladon; Keith Gotheridge; Duncan Kerr; Gasper Lawal; Malcolm Morley

Plummet Airlines was a British pub rock band of the mid-1970s, which was originally formed in Nottingham. Band members later joined The Pogues and Darts.

== History ==
The band was formed by students at Nottingham School of Art (now Nottingham Trent University, School of Art and Design), who needed a band for a film that fellow students John Crumpton and Graham Langford were making called 'One More Chance' about a fading rock and roll star, Shane Ventura. The band was initially called "The Brothel Creepers", after the band in the film. Harry Stephenson (vocal/guitar) had previously been in Harrogate band "Junkyard Angel", whilst Richard Booth (guitar/vocal), Darryl Hunt (bass) and Simon Bladon (drums) had played in a jazz-influenced band Moonlight Drive. Having completed the film, the band started playing gigs, and writing their own songs, mostly written by Stephenson.

In 1974 Duncan Kerr (guitar/vocals) joined. They changed their name to 'Glider' and got a residency at The Kensington, Olympia, London; one of the new pub-rock venues. A band called 'Glyder' forced them to change their name, so they became Plummet Airlines. Bladon left and was replaced on drums by Keith Gotheridge, and they played at the Hope and Anchor, Islington, where they met Malcolm Morley (ex Man and Help Yourself) who was living in the pub, and they soon moved in, after Fred Grainger and John Eichler, who ran "The Hope", became their managers.

They recorded their first Peel Session in August 1976. Dave Robinson, who ran the recording studio at The Hope and Anchor, gave them a one-record deal with Stiff Records who issued their first single: "Silver Shirt" / "This is the World" (BUY 8) produced by Sean Tyla. Morley started jamming with them and joined them for a Dutch tour in 1976, where they also supported Clancy. Morley recorded a solo album, at Foel Studios, using Plummet Airlines as the backing musicians, but the master tape was then lost until 2002, when it was issued as Lost and Found (Hux 34).

Gasper Lawal, who had been in Clancy, joined the band and appeared on their second Peel show in January 1977, and they supported Van der Graaf Generator, Rockpile and other bands. A second single "It's Hard" / "My Time in a While" was issued on State Records, but Grainger, their manager, could not agree an album deal. They split with Grainger, and sued him for mismanagement, as he was being ousted from "The Hope" by a coup d'état.

When punk arrived, they could not agree on what direction to follow. Booth left first, followed by Stephenson, and the band broke up in 1977. After the band split, Booth compiled a double album of their work, including live and studio recordings. This was issued in 1981 as a double LP On Stoney Ground on Armageddon Records. Three of the band formed The Favourites, a power-pop band. Bass player Darryl Hunt became lead vocalist, while Duncan Kerr on guitar and Keith Gotheridge on drums were joined by Tony Berry, guitar, and Kev Green, on bass, from Derby band the GTs. They played a lot of gigs and recorded two singles on Fourplay Records, covers of Abba's "SOS" and The Wasps "Angelica", and belatedly in 2017 released a full LP of unreleased songs from 1978 to 1979 by Kerr and Hunt, in the wake of an inferior Japanese bootleg. Gotheridge joined successful doo-wop/ r'n'b band Darts in 1980, joined by Kerr in 1982. Most of the original band still play occasional Darts gigs. Kerr played with The Electric Bluebirds for a while in 1985, joined up again with Booth in Country / honky-tonk band Audio Murphy from 1988 to 1992, playing in London and doing radio sets for Mary Costello on London radio GLR. From 2000 to 2019, Kerr collaborated with singer/songwriter Michael Proudfoot, releasing 2 CDs "Proudfoot" 2008, produced by BJ Cole, and 2016 "Flower of London". In 2004 there were two reunion concerts in Nottingham and one in London at former manager John Eichler's pub 'The Three Kings', Clerkenwell. In 2006 Kerr appeared in the 'Richard Booth Band', along with Ken Whaley (ex Man, and Help Yourself), on bass. Booth now fronts 'The Richard Booth Trio' along with keyboard player Andrew Hawkey and David Cornelius Eger on mandolin, releasing an album, Spill the Moon in early 2014.

Harry Stephenson continues to write and perform his material with his band 'The Last Pedestrians', which also includes Wayne Evans, front man and bass player of 'Gaffa' and occasional bassist for Plummet Airlines, now playing double bass. 'The Last Pedestrians' have played in Nottingham pubs since 2004.

== Personnel ==
- Simon Bladon – (drums) 1973–74
- Richard Booth – (guitar, vocals) throughout
- Keith Gotheridge – (drums) 1974–77
- Darryl Hunt – (bass, vocals) throughout
- Duncan Kerr – (guitar, vocals) 1974–77
- Gasper Lawal – (percussion) 1976–77
- Malcolm Morley – (guitar, keyboards) 1976
- Harry Stephenson – (guitar, vocals) throughout

== Subsequent careers ==
- Bladon – Played and recorded with British Bluesman Brian Knight, New Wave outfit AerialFX, Toured England/Europe and Greece with Folkband Pyewackett, London/Irish Band Schooners Rig and many others. Taught [drums] and has played in a Charity Band 'Step on the Gas' for the last 14 years including a concert in India following the 2003 tsunami. Retired from playing in 2015 following hearing problems.
- Booth – Played with Brainiac 5, Farenji Warriors and Audio Murphy before forming the Richard Booth Band, currently with The Richard Booth Trio who released Spill The Moon in 2014
- Hunt – Joined The Pogues and played with Steve Earle
- Gotheridge – Joined Darts
- Kerr – Joined Darts, later also joining Audio Murphy. As of May 2013 is with Brainiac 5.
- Lawal – Appeared with numerous other bands, including Stephen Stills, Graham Bond, Babe Ruth, Vinegar Joe, Camel and Wishbone Ash
- Morley – Played with Deke Leonard, Wreckless Eric and Kirsty McColl, issued solo albums Aliens (2001) and Lost and Found (see above)
- Stephenson – Played with Harry & The Atoms, Gaffa, Cycle Annie and The Last Pedestrians as well as regular solo slots on many Heineken Music Festivals during the 1990s.

== Discography ==
- "Silver Shirt" / "This is the World" – Stiff Records (BUY 8) Single (1976)

"Silver Shirt" also appeared in The Big Stiff Box Set 4CDs (SALVOBX402)
"This is the World" also appeared on the Hits Greatest Stiffs LP (FIST 1)

- "It's Hard" / "My Time in a While" – State Records – Single (1977)
- On Stoney Ground – Armageddon Records (Hedonics 1/2) Double LP (1981)

With Malcolm Morley

- Lost and Found – (Hux 34) CD (2002)

== In popular culture ==
The 2006 video game Grand Theft Auto: Vice City Stories, features an airline named after the band. The company logo, partially inspired by Australian airline Qantas, is that of a plane flying downwards and its slogan is called "The Last Resort".
