= Desperate Character =

Studio album by Kirsty MacColl
- Released: July 1981
- Recorded: 1981
- Studio: Regents Park Studios, London
- Genre: New wave, pub rock, pop rock
- Length: 34:55
- Label: Polydor
- Producer: Barry "Bazza" Farmer

Kirsty MacColl chronology
Desperate Character (1981)	Kite (1989)

Desperate Character is the first solo album by the British singer-songwriter Kirsty MacColl, released in 1981. The album was re-released in March 1985 as Kirsty MacColl, with three tracks replaced with other songs. The album has been remastered and received a CD release for the first time on 8 October 2012 on the Union Square Music label and features the original twelve track listing.

== Critical reception ==
Professional ratings
Review scores
Source	Rating
AllMusic	3/5 stars
Record Mirror	4/5 stars
Smash Hits	4/10
Sounds	1/5 stars

Upon its release, Robin Denselow of The Guardian commented: "MacColl enlivened the hit parade earlier this summer with the witty "There's a Guy Works Down the Chip Shop Swears He's Elvis", but hasn't quite developed the range necessary to fill an LP. The melodies are mostly pleasant and straightforward but even more adventurous lyrics are needed. She's certain got songwriting potential." Aberdeen Press and Journal stated: "Having successfully got herself into the public gaze with her unlikely single, Kirsty sounds as if she could make a bigger name for herself with this album. There is not much original in the content, but she has an interesting delivery and sounds as if she could do great things with better material." Johnny Black of Smash Hits felt the "well-respected" musicians playing on the album ensured a "musically competent outing", but added "the melodies are so derivative that it seems Kirsty has nothing original to offer."

Simon Mares of the Reading Evening Post wrote: "It's not that her country-rock totally lacks style, it's that so many others do it better." Paul Tickell of the NME called the album "so thin it has to be built around 'There's a Guy Works Down the Chip Shop Swears He's Elvis'". He noted that the "charm and novelty soon pall" as MacColl presents only "country pastiches" and "significantly abysmal" numbers that attempt to "captur[e] the '60s". He concluded: "Against the grain of her pastiches, Kirsty reveals hints of a genuine songwriting ability, but it's not the kind of talent which can be stretched over an eclectric hotchpotch and come out winning. The same can be said about that thin voice, bouncing notes off a tinny roof; neither hot nor cold."

== Track listing ==
All tracks composed by Kirsty MacColl; except where indicated

=== Desperate Character (1981) ===
Side A
No.	Title	Writer(s)	Length
1.	"Clock Goes Round"	Kirsty MacColl	2:33
2.	"See That Girl"	Kirsty MacColl	2:59
3.	"There's a Guy Works Down the Chip Shop Swears He's Elvis"	MacColl, Philip Rambow	3:04
4.	"Teenager in Love"	MacColl	2:33
5.	"Mexican Sofa"	MacColl, Lu Edmonds	3:11
6.	"Until the Night"	MacColl, Phil Johnstone	3:07

Side B
No.	Title	Writer(s)	Length
7.	"Falling For Faces"	MacColl, Edmonds	2:28
8.	"Just One Look"	Doris Payne, Gregory Carroll	2:17
9.	"The Real Ripper"	MacColl, Edmonds	3:20
10.	"Hard To Believe"	MacColl	2:17
11.	"He Thinks I Still Care"	Royden D. Lipscombe, Steve Duffy	2:54
12.	"There's a Guy Works Down the Chip Shop Swears He's Elvis" (country version)"	MacColl, Rambow	3:42

=== Kirsty MacColl (1985) ===
Kirsty MacColl is essentially a reworked version of Desperate Character, with the following changes:

- "Mexican Sofa", "Just One Look" and the country version of "There's a Guy Works Down the Chip Shop Swears He's Elvis" were dropped.
- The previously unissued tracks "Annie", "Roman Gardens" and "Berlin" were substituted in their places.
- For a "Special Edition" release of the album, two additional previously unissued tracks were added: "Man With No Name" and "Sleepless Nights".
- All previously unissued tracks were recorded in January 1983 at the sessions for MacColl's shelved second album Real. "Berlin" was later re-recorded for a one-off single on North of Watford Records, released in August 1983.
1. "Clock Goes Round" – 2:33
2. "See That Girl" – 2:59
3. "There's a Guy Works Down the Chip Shop Swears He's Elvis" (MacColl, Rambow) – 3:04
4. "Teenager in Love" – 2:33
5. "Annie" – 4:33
6. "Until the Night" (MacColl, Johnstone) – 3:07
7. "Falling For Faces" (MacColl, Edmonds) – 2:28
8. "Roman Gardens" (Hamish MacColl, Gavin Povey) – 3:57
9. "The Real Ripper" (MacColl, Edmonds) – 3:20
10. "Hard To Believe" – 2:17
11. "He Thinks I Still Care" (Lipscombe, Duffy) – 2:54
12. "Berlin" – 3:34
13. "Man With No Name" *
14. "Sleepless Nights" *

(* Special Edition only)

== Personnel ==
Musicians

- Kirsty MacColl – vocals
- Lu Edmonds – guitar
- Billy Bremner – guitar, background vocals
- Malcolm Morley – guitar
- Phil Rambow – guitar
- Barry "Bazza" Farmer – guitar
- Glyn Havard – bass
- Paul Riley – bass
- Gavin Povey – piano
- Lee Partis – drums
- Ben Mandelson – fiddle
- "Irish" John Earle – tenor and baritone saxophone
- Ray Beavis – tenor saxophone
- Chris Gower – trombone
- Dick Hanson – trumpet
- Lew Lewis – harmonica (credited as "vamping")
- Blanche McAdorey – background vocals

Technical

- Barry "Bazza" Farmer – producer, mixing
- Kirsty MacColl – mixing
- Rob O'Connor – design, art direction
- Alan Ballard – cover photography
- John Anderson – hand tinting

Kirsty MacColl previously unissued tracks

- Dave Jordan – producer
- Philip Bodger – engineer
- Recorded at Regents Park Studios

== Charts ==
Chart (1981)	Peak position
Dutch Albums Chart	44
