= The Stiffs (band) =

English punk rock and power pop band

- Origin: Blackburn, England
- Genres: Punk rock; pop punk; power pop
- Years active: 1976–present
- Labels: EMI; Stiff
- Members: Ian Barnes; Phil Hendriks; John McVittie; Tommy O'Kane
- Past members: Mark Coleridge; Steve Feilding; John Mayor; Nick Alderson; Mark Hurlbutt; John Wade; Jimmy Devlin

The Stiffs are an English band, variously referred to as punk rock, pop punk and power pop, hailing from Blackburn, Lancashire. Championed by Radio 1 DJ John Peel, their most successful singles were "Inside Out" and "Goodbye My Love". Band members are Phil Hendriks (vocals, guitar), Ian "Strang" Barnes (guitar, vocals), "Big" John McVittie (bass guitar, vocals) and Tommy O'Kane (drums).

== History ==
The Stiffs were formed in 1976 by 14-year-old school pals Phil Hendriks (lead vocals, guitar) and Ian "Strang" Barnes (guitar, vocals), joined by Tommy O'Kane (drums) and Mark "Ossie" Young (bass guitar) and played their first gig at East Lancs Cricket Club in 1977. Following several local church hall and youth club bookings playing a mixture of covers and original Hendriks/Barnes compositions, Young was replaced by "Big" John McVittie (bass guitar, vocals). Their first single "Standard English" b/w "Brookside Riot Squad" / "DC-RIP" was released on their own Dork Records label in early 1979, now regarded as rare and collectible. In December 1979 the band, having tightened by this time into a powerful live act despite being legally unable to order a pint at gigs, released their second single "Inside Out"/ "Kids On The Street", recorded at Oldham's Pennine Sound Studios on a budget of £75, produced by engineer Paul Adshead and the band. A mistake at the pressing plant led to the first 1,000 copies having the labels printed on the wrong sides.

John Peel played the record incessantly on his show, quoted as saying on air that "Inside Out" was "the greatest record in the history of the universe". Championing the band Peel, interrupted DJ Mike Read's show on air to insist that he play the record. The Skids and The Ruts had enjoyed Peel's patronage in 1978 and 1979, and similar was forecast for The Stiffs. Following Peel and Read radio sessions the single became an indie chart hit, the single was reissued by EMI's Zonophone subsidiary label in early 1980.

The Stiffs signed a long-term deal with EMI in mid-1980, the band now managed by Hedley Leyton, the brother of the musician and actor John Leyton. Initial recordings were produced by Dale Griffin and Pete Overend Watts of Mott the Hoople (Griffin was later to occupy the drum stool for the band on a later Peel session). The resulting tracks "Innocent Bystander", "Volume Control" and "Best Place In Town" were not to EMI's liking and, despite re-mixes, the tracks were consigned to their vaults. This meant that the Stiffs still had no follow-up record to "Inside Out".

At this point, their A&R man Chris Briggs left EMI for Phonogram Records, leaving the band unrepresented. New songs were being demoed but no-one at EMI seemed in any hurry to release any product by the band. Eventually, EMI booked the band into Rockfield Studios with production duties by engineer Pat Moran and former Rockpile and Love Sculpture bassist, John David. This time EMI were happy with the results and released "Volume Control" as the new single, backed with "Nothing To Lose", a demo recorded in September at EMI's Manchester Square Studios, a song reflecting this difficult situation with some humour. "Volume Control" was afforded considerable Radio 1 daytime airplay, DJ Paul Burnett naming them "The Slade of the 1980s". Journalist Gary Bushell enthused "...pile driving pop-punk of the first order... a band to be reckoned with I'd wager." The record climbed the Oi charts, while at the same time fooling rock DJ's that they were part of the new wave of British heavy metal. The band earned the respect of their London peers and were joined by Steve Jones of the Sex Pistols on stage at the Marquee Club on one occasion. "Innocent Bystander" was scheduled for release, then inexplicably cancelled. Plans for an album were put on hold, leading the band's management to demand they be released from their contract.

A deal with Stiff Records was secured, with the band being told to record their cover of The Glitter Band's 1975 hit "Goodbye My Love" at 12 hours notice. Dumbfounded as to why an original song had not been chosen, "Goodbye My Love" was released in February 1981 and declared by journalist Carol Clerk "Pop with steel toe caps". Despite radio and press promotion and a national tour with the UK Subs and Anti-Pasti, distribution problems ensued, in addition the single was difficult to obtain and sales were not sufficient to interest Stiff Records in a follow up. By mid-1981, six months after being hailed as a 'Slade for the 1980s', The Stiffs were now 'two years too late', by mid-1981 the original line-up split.

In 1982, a short lived line up emerged featuring Hendriks and Barnes with John Mayor (drums) and Nick Alderson (bass) recording a new Peel session but it lasted less than a year. This session featured ex Mott The Hoople drummer Dale Griffin, who also took up producing duties.

In December 1984, the EMI line-up reunited for a one-off gig, which had to be rescheduled for February 1985 at a larger venue, after enthusiastic fans caused the gig to be curtailed after 15 minutes due to fears for everyone's safety. Between these dates, the Stiffs recorded a fifth single "The Young Guitars"; Hendriks and Barnes recruiting John Mayer and Mark Hurlbutt (bass) with additional guitarist John Wade on the b-side "Yer Under Attack". Tommy O'Kane joined this five-piece line up on some dates throughout 1985 and 1986 in a two drummer format, and John McVittie rejoined with the band back to a four-piece with Hendriks, Barnes and Mayor. In late 1986, Liverpool drummer Mark Coleridge (Afraid of Mice, Glass Torpedoes) and bassist Steve Fielding joined with Hendriks and Barnes in a powerful 'glam punk' line up that went on to record several strong tracks and play over 250 live dates throughout Europe, finally splitting in 1988.

13 years after the Stiffs last record had been released, two of the group's songs finally appeared on CD, courtesy of Anagram Records, who released a compilation of EMI's Zonophone singles entitled The Zonophone Punk Singles Collection. March 1999 saw the release of the first complete album of Stiffs material, when Captain Oi! Records issued the Stiffs-the Punk Collection on CD. The album was a collection of the band's singles plus many hitherto unreleased demos and masters, covering the band's entire history.

== 1999 reunion ==
In 1999, The Stiffs were approached to appear in a reality TV show, the researchers interested in fractious situations relating to the reformation of a punk band. The show never went ahead, but the EMI line-up reconvened for a live show, with an overwhelming response. The gig was recorded by original Stiffs engineer Paul Adshead and released by Trojan/Receiver Records as a live album Volume Control - Live!.

Summer of the year 2000 found the original line-up re-united once more to play the UK 'Holidays in the sun' festival, which coincided with the release of the 'Volume Control - Live' album and towards the end of the year, negotiations took place with both EMI and Angel Air Records for the release of two separate retrospective albums. It was decided that the EMI album, Innocent Bystanders, would focus on the band's early career up to the end of 1980, while the Angel Air project, Stiffology, would take the story from 1981 to 1988. January 2000 saw the release of the Stiffology CD album. Rarities included the 1982 session recorded with Mott the Hoople's Dale Griffin performing the drums. Griffin also wrote the sleevenotes.

The EMI retrospective compilation album Innocent Bystanders, was issued in April 2001, just days after the original line up's two appearances at the 'Alternative Rock Weekend' at Butlins Minehead, a celebration of 25 years of punk, featuring many of the original bands such as The Damned, UK Subs, and Chelsea. The album received a 4K review in Kerrang! magazine who referred to the band as "one of the (punk) era's best kept secrets that's only just been let out".

In early 2002, another Stiffs track featured on the EMI compilation All Covered In Punk, while "Volume Control" cropped up a couple of months later on EMI's 24 Carat Punk compilation. Phil Hendriks entered the recording studio with a revised line-up in January 2002, including Glaswegian Jim Devlin of The Carpettes on guitar, Rob Fidler on bass and Rick Cook on drums. The four songs recorded at the session were "Four Winds", "Everlasting", "Terminal Crazy"' and "Trust in Me". In September 2002, 1977 Records of Tokyo re-issued the two singles, "Volume Control" and "Goodbye My Love" on vinyl in Japan. 1977 also released "Four Winds" b/w "Everlasting" from the January 2002 sessions as a 7" vinyl single. This line up played a short series of Japanese dates to promote the singles.

In September 2004, "Brookside Riot Squad" from the Stiffs first single was covered by Chicago punk band Street Brats on their album Dead End Kids, and covered again in 2009 by German band Loaded on their 'Proper Villains' EP, featuring the amended title and lyric 'Mannheim Riot Squad'.

The original EMI band members reunited for a concert at Blackburn King George's Hall on 11 November 2005, filmed by Blackburn College media students. The Stiffs were joined by the original Fast Cars, Dustin's Bar Mitzvah and Dave Philp of The Automatics, who joined The Stiffs on stage for Automatics songs "When The Tanks Roll Over Poland Again", "Trash", "She Devils Of Beverly Hills", "A Mighty Long Way From Memphis" and "British Beat". The event was released on DVD in July 2006 and in the same year the band were also included in Alex Ogg's book, No More Heroes: A Complete History of UK Punk from 1976 to 1980.

August 2007 saw The Stiffs appearing alongside Cockney Rejects and Sham 69 at the Antifest event in the Czech Republic to a crowd of 2,500, with Rick Cook standing in for an unavailable Tommy O'Kane. In November 2008, German label Still Unbeatable Records issued the cancelled 1981 single "Innocent Bystander" b/w "Affairs Of The Heart" on 7" vinyl. At the same time, Italian label Snaps issued a limited edition CD The Unreleased Singles EP featuring "Innocent Bystander", "Affairs Of The Heart", "Best Place In Town" (1982 version) and "Stand Up" (1982 version). 2009 saw a rare live appearances at the Darwen Live festival and a home town gig to mark the 30th anniversary of their first single, "Inside Out". In 2010, Still Unbeatable Records released a vinyl EP featuring The Stiffs, Mattless Boys, Boss Martians and Arctic Depression. The band also appeared at the Still Unbeatable 77 punk festival alongside the Mattless Boys, Fast Cars and The Plague as well as playing at the annual Rebellion Festival at the Winter Gardens, Blackpool.

In November 2010, the original line up played a series of dates in the Basque region of Spain, Donostia and Madrid. Spanish label Antiguays Records released two new songs recorded by the band in March 2012 on 7" vinyl, "Extreemager" b/w "Laugh In My Face", the first Stiffs single featuring all original members since 1981's "Goodbye My Love".

In 2023 US label PNV Records commenced to release a four vinyl album series on their Projectile Platters imprint, covering the bands output from 1978 to 1985, including a singles collection and three discs of demos and rarities.

The band continues to appear regularly on compilations alongside major bands of the time. They are one of a few remaining bands from the era who continue to perform with all four original members. The journalist, Carol Clerk stated, following a 1981 performance, "I haven't seen so much energy, musically or physically from any band in a long time. This is a marriage of instant melody and hooks with the power and forcefulness of punk".

== Discography ==
=== Singles ===
- 1979 - "Standard English" / "D-C RIP" / "Brookside Riot Squad" DORK records UR-1 7"
- 1980 - "Inside Out" / "Kids On The Street" DORK records UR-2 7"
- 1980 - "Inside Out" / "Kids On The Street" DORK records UR-2 7" (Second pressing)
- 1980 - "Inside Out" / "Kids On The Street" (Re-issue) EMI / Zonophone Z3 7"
- 1980 - "Volume Control" / "Nothing To Lose" EMI / Zonophone Z14 7"
- 1981 - "Goodbye My Love" / "Magic Roundabout" STIFF records BUY 86 7"
- 1985 - "The Young Guitars" / "Yer Under Attack" DORK records UR-7 12" Only
- 2002 - "Four Winds" / "Everlasting" 1977 RECORDS 1977-S041 7" JAPAN
- 2008 - "The Unreleased Singles E.P." SNAPS RECORDS CD E.P. ITALY
- 2008 - "Innocent Bystander" / "Affairs Of The Heart" STILL UNBEATABLE RECORDS SUR 001 7" GERMAN
- 2012 - "Extreemager" / "Laugh In My Face" ANTIGUAYS RECORDS AG-01 7" SPAIN

=== Known overseas singles ===
- 1981- "Goodbye My Love" / "Magic Roundabout" STIFF RECORDS MO2036 SPAIN
- 1981- "Goodbye My Love" / "Magic Roundabout" (Spanish Promo) STIFF RECORDS MO2036 (Promo) SPAIN
- 1981- "Goodbye My Love" / "Magic Roundabout" STIFF RECORDS BUY 86 BELGIUM
- 1981- "Goodbye My Love" / "Magic Roundabout" STIFF/ FESTIVAL K-8259 AUSTRALIA
- 2002 - "Volume Control" / "Nothing To Lose" 1977 RECORDS 1977-S039 7" JAPAN
- 2002 - "Goodbye My Love" / "Magic Roundabout" 1977 RECORDS 1977-S040 7" JAPAN
- 2002 - "Four Winds" / "Everlasting" 1977 RECORDS 1977-S041 7" JAPAN
- 2008 - "The Unreleased Singles E.P." SNAPS RECORDS CD E.P. ITALY
- 2008 - "Innocent Bystander" / "Affairs of the Heart" STILL UNBEATABLE RECORDS SUR 001 7" GERMANY
- 2012 - "Extreemager" / "Laugh In My Face" ANTIGUAYS RECORDS AG-01 7" SPAIN

=== UK albums ===
- 1999 - THE STIFFS - THE PUNK COLLECTION Captain Oi! Records AHOYCD102
- 2000 - VOLUME CONTROL - LIVE! Receiver Records RRCD289
- 2001 - STIFFOLOGY 1981-88 Angel Air Records SJPCD062
- 2001 - INNOCENT BYSTANDERS EMI Records 5324682

=== US Vinyl albums ===
- 2023 - THE STIFFS - THE SINGLES COLLECTION 1979–1985 (LP and Booklet) Projectile Platters US PP13
- 2024 - THE STIFFS - DEMOS AND RARITIES 1978–1981 (LP and Booklet) Projectile Platters US PP14

=== DVDs ===
2006 - "LET`S ACTIVATE" DVD Dork Records DORKVD 001 (Region 0 / PAL Format)

=== UK compilation appearances ===
- 1985 - "NORTH BY NORTH WEST" Compilation of bands from the North West of England, features: "Yer Under Attack" User Friendly records Vinyl LP
- 1986 - "THE ADVOCACY TAPES" Compilation in aid of "Children In Need" featuring: "Sold On You" Radio Lancashire Cassette
- 1997 - "ZONOPHONE - The Punk Singles Collection" Compilation of Zonophone releases featuring: "Inside Out" and "Volume Control" ANAGRAM CD PUNK 97 CD
- 2001 - "WHATEVER HAPPENED TO" New wave compilation, featuring: "Nothing To Lose" EMI records 7243 5 29238 2 CD
- 2001 - "PUNK LIVES - BEST OF PUNK" New wave compilation, featuring: "Tomorrow's Still Alive" (Live 1999 version) Castle Music / Sanctuary records CMDDD 352 Double CD
- 2001 - "CASH FROM CHAOS" 100 songs by 100 New Wave bands, featuring: "Inside Out" EMI records 7243 5 35824 2 5 4 X CD Book/box set
- 2002 - "ALL COVERED IN PUNK" Compilation of New Wave bands playing covers, featuring: "Goodbye My Love" EMI records 7243 5 37760 2 2 CD
- 2002 - "24 CARAT PUNK" featuring: "Volume Control". EMI records 7243 5 39134 2 7 CD
- 2003 - "RAIDING THE VAULTS - Volume 2" Stiff Records rarities album, featuring: "Goodbye My Love" Blitz / Pickwick Records 781052 CD
- 2004 - "GUITAR ANTHEMS - 18 HEADBANGIN' HITS" Rock compilation, featuring: "Goodbye My Love" EMI Gold 7243 5 96750 2 2 CD
- 2004 -"GREATEST HITS OF PUNK & NEW WAVE" (3 x CD Set) Punk compilation, featuring: "Goodbye My Love" EMI Gold 7243 8 63476 2 6 3 x CD
- 2005 - "IF THE KIDS ARE UNITED" (3 x CD Set) featuring: "Volume Control" Castle Music / Sanctuary records CMETD 1194 3 x CD
- 2006 - "COMPLETE PUNK" (2 x CD Set) featuring: "Inside Out" EMI & Sony BMG - 0946 3 74316 2 7 2xCD Exclusive to Tesco Stores
- 2006 - "PRETTY VACANT - THE HISTORY OF PUNK" (2 x CD Set) featuring: "Inside Out" EMI Gold B000GPI3J4
- 2012 - "THE ULTIMATE DIY SONGS" (2 x CD Set) featuring: "Goodbye My Love" EMI Gold 50999 635437 2 8
- 2017 - "GARY CROWLEY'S PUNK AND NEW WAVE (30 Tracks Rare Punk Gems And New Wave Nuggets 1977–1982)" (3 x CD Set) featuring: "Inside Out" Edsel Records EDSL0015
- 2018 - "BURNING BRITAIN - A STORY OF UK INDEPENDENT PUNK 1980-1984" (4 x CD Set) featuring: "Volume Control" Cherry Red CRCDBOX53
- 2018 - "HARMONY IN MY HEAD: UK POWER POP & NEW WAVE 1977-81" (3 x CD Set) featuring: "Magic Roundabout" Cherry Red CRCDBOX62
- 2022 - "KIDS ON THE STREET - UK POWER POP AND NEW WAVE 1977-1981" (3 x CD Set) featuring: "Kids On The Street" Cherry Red CRCDBOX137
- 2022 - 1980 (BRAND NEW RAGE) (3 x CD Set) featuring: "Volume Control" Captain Oi! AHOYBX387
- 2023 - TEENAGE GLAMPAGE! (80 GLAMBUSTERS, SHOCKERS AND TEENYBOPPERS FROM THE 70's!) (4 x CD Set) featuring: "Yer Under Attack" 7T's Records GLAMBOX195
- 2023 - 1981 (ALL OUT ATTACK!) (3 x CD Set) featuring: "Magic Roundabout" Captain Oi! AHOYBX390
- 2023 - "WHERE HAVE ALL THE BOOT BOYS GONE? (A CELEBRATION OF YOB ROCK)" (3 x CD Set) featuring: "Nothing To Lose" Captain Oi! AHOYBX391
- 2024 - "NEW GUITARS IN TOWN: POWER POP 1978-82" (3 x CD Set) featuring: "Innocent Bystander" Cherry Red CRCD3BOX167

=== Overseas compilation appearances ===
- 2001 - "ANOTHER BUNCH OF STIFFS FROM NISHI-SHINJUKU 747" (Japanese release) Compilation of STIFF label releases featuring: "Goodbye My Love" and "Magic Roundabout" VINYL JAPAN SELL3 2 x Vinyl Album
- 2002 - "ESSENTIAL PUNK ROCK" (U.S.A release) featuring: "Tomorrow's Still Alive" (Live 1999 version) BMG Special Products 46982 CD and Cassette 75517 46992 2 1
- 2005 -"PUNK EXPLOSION" (3 X CD Set) (Netherlands release) Punk compilation, featuring: "Goodbye My Love" DISKY Records CB 902727 3 x CD

== Bibliography ==
- Ogg, Alex. No More Heroes: A Complete History of UK Punk from 1976 to 1980. London: Cherry Red Books, 2006. ISBN 1-901447-65-0.
