= Lew Lewis =

English harmonica player and vocalist (1953–2021)

Keith "Lew" Lewis (21 April 1953 – 16 April 2021) was an English harmonica player and vocalist, who was a member of Eddie and the Hot Rods before forming his own bands. Influenced in style by Little Walter, he also guested on albums by The Stranglers, The Clash and others.

== Career ==
Lewis was born in Hammersmith, London, England, and moved to Canvey Island when he was thirteen. He soon became friends with Lee Brilleaux, who taught Lewis to play harmonica. Lewis' first performances were as a member of the Southside Jug Band on Canvey Island, which included future Dr Feelgood members Brilleaux and John B Sparks, together with Chris White. Guitarist Dave Higgs joined and they renamed themselves the Fix.

Higgs later invited Lewis to become a member of Eddie and the Hot Rods, where Lewis performed on their first two singles "Writing on the Wall" and "Wooly Bully". He was known as a wild frontman, but left "after falling out with the management".

He then released a solo single for Stiff Records, their fifth single "Boogie on the Street" / "Caravan Man", backed by a thinly disguised Dr Feelgood; the B side of the single later appearing on Hits Greatest Stiffs. Briefly moving to United Artists Records he released "Out for a Lark" / "Watch Yourself", which could credit Brilleaux and Sparks, as they were on UA. He returned to Stiff for his next single "Lucky Seven" / "Night Talk" (1978) his most successful single, which led to his appearing on Top of the Pops, and which was covered by Dr Feelgood on their album Sneakin' Suspicion and also appears in the film, Oil City Confidential.

His album Save the Wail (1979) produced by Paul Riley, featured Buzz Barwell (ex Dr. Feelgood) and Bob Clouter (Ex Mickey Jupp's The Orioles) on drums, Rick Taylor and Pete Zear on guitars and Johnny Squirrel on bass, collectively known as Lew Lewis Reformer, they were, stylistically, "between pub rock and blues-rock". They toured Europe, being particularly popular in France and appeared on Musikladen in 1979. Also in 1979 Lewis, Dr Feelgood and Jools Holland performing as 'The Oil City Sheiks', issued a single "Don't Take but a Few Minutes" / "Blues Jam".

Lewis was also a guest on several albums, including The Stranglers' Black and White (1978), Jean-Jacques Burnel's Euroman Cometh (1979), The Clash's Sandinista! (1980), Kirsty MacColl’s Desperate Character (1981), Sniff 'n' the Tears Ride Blue Divide (1982) and Wilko Johnson's Bottle Up and Go! (1983).

In 1987, Lewis was given a seven-year jail sentence for armed robbery, after holding up a post office with a fake pistol, stealing £5,000 and trying to escape on a shopping bike.

On his release, he issued a single "Shame, Shame, Shame" whilst Boogie on the Street Again!, a live album recorded in June 1977 and July 1979, was released in Japan in 1999. The 2002 CD reissue of Save the Wail, also included the Stiff singles, "Boogie on the Street" and "1–30, 2–30, 3–35", as well as live recordings from 1977 and 1979.

Despite his prison sentence, Lewis had undiagnosed "bipolar and psychotic episodes", and a drug addiction. In November 2009, he announced that having had "mental health issues" and "a breakdown", and been in and out of hospital "for the past eight years", he was finally drug-free, and only taking prescribed medication.

Lewis performed with a new band Spooky Blues but, as of December 2010, he was performing as the Lew Lewis band, with Dave Deville (guitar and backing vocals) and Emma May (bass and backing vocals), and was looking for a new drummer to perform on their forthcoming European tours, and a Japanese tour in March 2011.

His death was announced by the CanveyIsland.org website on 17 April 2021.

== Discography ==
With Eddie and the Hot Rods

- "Writing on the Wall" / "Cruisin' (in the Lincoln)" (1976)
- "Wooly Bully" / "Horseplay (Weary of the Schmaltz)" (1976)

As Lew Lewis and his Band

- "Boogie on the Street" / "Caravan Man" (1976) Stiff (BUY 5)
- "Out for a Lark" / "Watch Yourself" (1977) United Artists

As Lew Lewis Reformer

- "Lucky Seven" / "Night Talk" (1978) Stiff (LEW1)
- "Win Or Lose" / "Photo-Finish" (1979) Stiff (BUY 48)
- Save the Wail (1979) Stiff (SEEZ 16), re-released with bonus tracks in 2002 on Hux 033
- "1–30, 2–30, 3–35" / "The Mood I'm In" (1980) Stiff (BUY 68)

As Lew Lewis

- Boogie on the Street Again! (1999) CD (Vinyl Japan 82)
- "Shame, Shame, Shame" / "Louie Louie" (1987) (Waterfront Records WTF 35)

As The Oil City Sheiks

- "Don't Take but a Few Minutes" / "Blues Jam" (1979)

As Wilko Johnson & Lew Lewis Band

- " I Wanna Be Your Lover"/"Caravan Man" (1983)(Magnum Force Records, Carrere Distribution;13188/1 & 13188/2)

=== Compilations ===
- Hits Greatest Stiffs (1977) Stiff
- Last Compilation Stiff
- Motorway Cassette Stiff – unclear if ever issued
- Live and Rare – Eddie and the Hot Rods (1993) Receiver
- Best of Sniff 'n' the Tears – Sniff 'n' the Tears (2000) Chiswick
- Do Anything You Wanna Do – Eddie and the Hot Rods (2000) Spectrum
- Stiff, Stiffer, Stiffest: A Stiff Records Collection (2001)
- The UA Singles '77–'79 – The Stranglers (2001) EMI
