= Dirty Looks (New York band) =

American rock band

- Origin: Staten Island, New York, United States
- Genres: Power pop
- Years active: 1977–1982
- Labels: Stiff, Epic

Dirty Looks was an American rock band from Staten Island, New York, United States, formed in 1977. They are best known for the songs "Let Go" and "Tailing You", which were minor hits. Both videos were in rotation in the early days of MTV.

== Background ==
Dirty Looks was formed in 1977 and began playing cover songs before writing a set of gritty pop songs inspired by the 1960s. The band consisted of singer/guitarist Patrick Barnes, drummer Peter Parker Minucci, and bassist Marco Sin.

The band released two albums for Stiff Records in the UK (Epic Records in the US), Dirty Looks and Turn It Up, along with several singles. Their debut album was Stiff's biggest album release in the United States, selling more than 100,000 copies in 1980. Turn It Up was originally produced and mixed by Nick Garvey (of The Motors), but Epic Records did not like the edgy approach and wanted a more mainstream sound for the band.

The band was discovered by Squeeze bassist John Bentley when they played at CBGB in New York. Bentley brought then Grand Funk Railroad manager Andy Cavaliere to the band's next show. Cavaliere made the band sign a napkin promising to appear in his office the next day.

Their first album, Dirty Looks, was first released in America. The band launched the record by appearing unannounced outside the 52nd Street New York offices of EPIC on a flat-bed truck complete with PA, drums and a film crew. The street filled with lunch-time office workers grooving to the band, and New York cops from the local precinct fought through the crowd to stop the disturbance. The result was an arrest and a fifteen-minute movie of three Dirty Looks tracks. A second album, Turn It Up, was released in 1981.

In 1980, Dirty Looks came to the UK for the Son of Stiff tour. With four other Stiff acts, Dirty Looks played 61 gigs in 11 countries in 70 days. They are best known for the songs "Let Go" and "Tailing You," which were minor hits. Both videos were in rotation in the early days of MTV.

In 1983, the group prepared demos for an unreleased third album titled "Unsung Heroes." Four tracks from that album were included on 12 O'Clock High, an Italian career retrospective compilation, in 2002.

Bassist Marco Sin (born Marcus Robert Weissmann) died in 1995.

In February 2014, drummer Peter Parker Minucci worked with Omaha band "Naive Filter" to record two Dirty Looks originals, "Love Crimes" and "Kiss of Death."

== Discography ==
=== Albums ===
- 1980: Dirty Looks
- 1981: Turn It Up
