= King Kurt =

British rock band

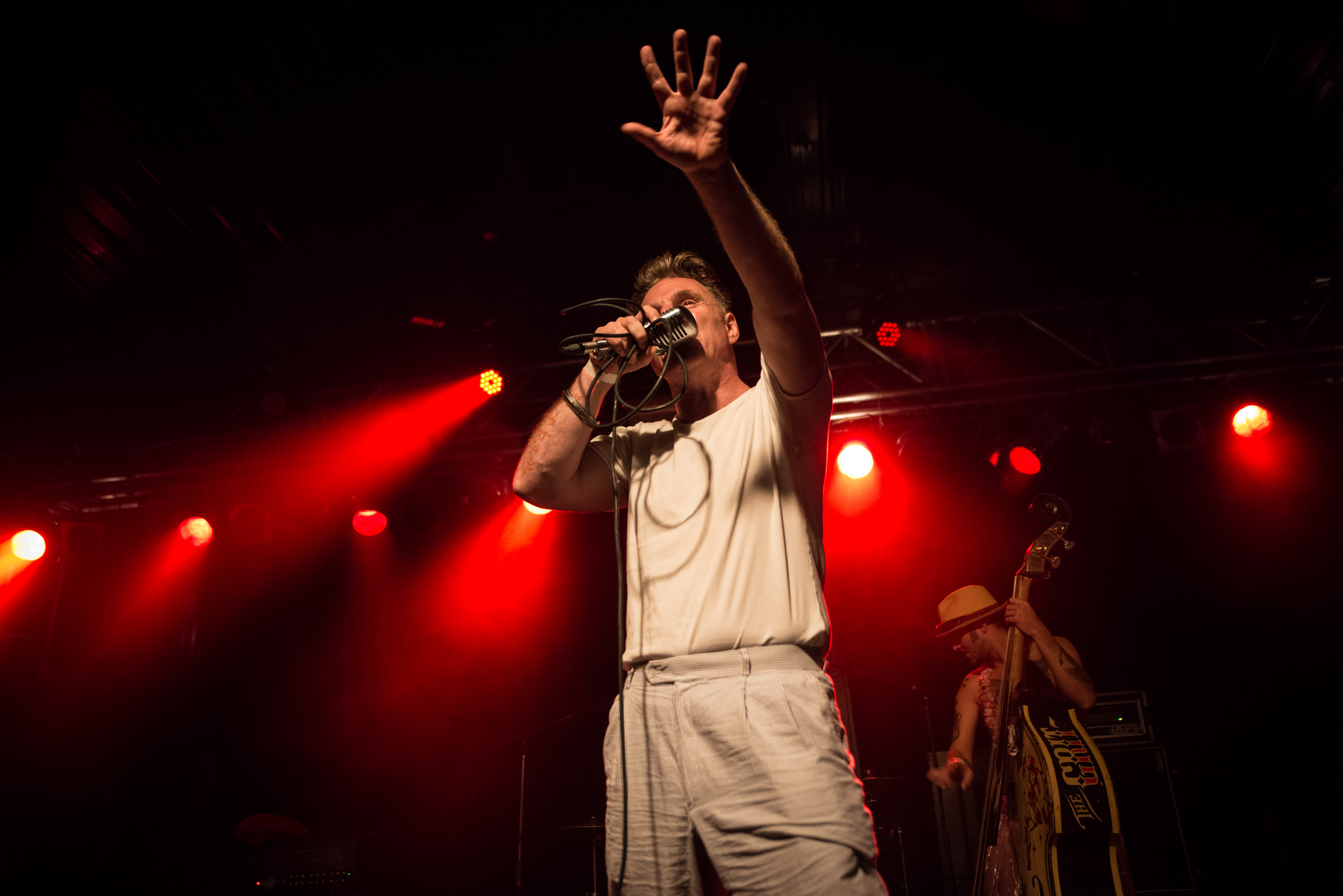
- King Kurt Live in Munich

Background information
- Genres: Rock n Roll; Psychobilly
- Years active: 1981–1988, 1992–1996, 2012–present
- Label: Stiff
- Spinoffs: Rockin' Kurt
- Members: Gary "The Smeg" Cayton - Vocals
- Past members: Paul "Thwak" Laventhol - Guitar; John Reddington - Saxophone; Gaff - Drums; Bert Boustead - Bass; Eli Irvine - Guitar
- Website: Official website

King Kurt are a rock-n-roll band from the UK. They formed in 1981 and split up in 1988, although they have reformed sporadically and played a reunion concert in 2010 or the Psychobilly Meeting in Spain 2024. They are best known for their song, "Destination Zululand" (1983).

== Formation ==
The band began as Rockin' Kurt and his Saur Krauts in 1981, with Jef Harvey on vocals, John Reddington on guitar, Bert Boustead on bass guitar, Alan "Maggot" Power on saxophone and Rory Lyons on drums. Paul "Thwack" Laventhol joined on guitar at their third gig in July 1981, and the name was shortened to King Kurt later that year.

== Notoriety ==
Harvey left in 1982 to be replaced by Gary "The Smeg" Cayton as vocalist, and it was at Harvey's farewell concert at the 101 Club in Battersea, London that the infamous "food fight" gigs started. The band were known for their stage performances in which eggs and bags of flour were thrown around both on and off stage. Free haircuts and other audience participation included stage props such as "The Wheel of Misfortune", a wheel on which a fan was strapped and fed Snakebite through a tube. Themed concerts included "Kurt Skirts", where admittance was refused to men unless wearing a skirt, or Easter concerts with the band dressed as legionaries, angels on flying trapeze, and an extra in a loincloth on a cross at the back of the stage.

== Albums ==
The band joined Stiff Records in 1983 and recorded the album Ooh Wallah Wallah with producer, Dave Edmunds. They had a few minor hit singles that featured in the UK Singles and UK Indie Charts, such as "Zulu Beat", Weill and Brecht's "Mack the Knife" and "Banana Banana", along with their Top 40 hit "Destination Zululand", which reached No. 36 in the UK Singles Chart in October 1983.

Their second album, Big Cock, was produced by Phil Wainman and released on Polydor in 1986.

== Post-heyday ==
During 1988 the band split, though between 1992 and 1996 the group, featuring three of the original members, were performing as a live act. John Reddington has been a solicitor and trademark lawyer for two decades. Smeg performed as 'I Can't Believe It's Not King Kurt'. A compilation album was issued in 2009, and a reunion concert took place in March 2010. In 2012 they were confirmed to play the Olympia 1 and 2 at the Rebellion Festival in Blackpool on the same bill as Conflict, Subhumans and Stiff Little Fingers. In 2017 the band were booked to play several gigs in the north of the UK, and since then have played numerous concerts and festivals across the country and abroad, including a messy 'Pudding Party' gig at the Underground in Stoke-on-Trent in 2026.

In September 2026 the band's promoter announced that Gary "The Smeg" Cayton would be parting ways with the rest of the band but continuing as King Kurt with new musicians, while the rest of the members would be continuing as Rockin' Kurt with a new vocalist.

King Kurt at Free & Easy Festival 2014 in Munich

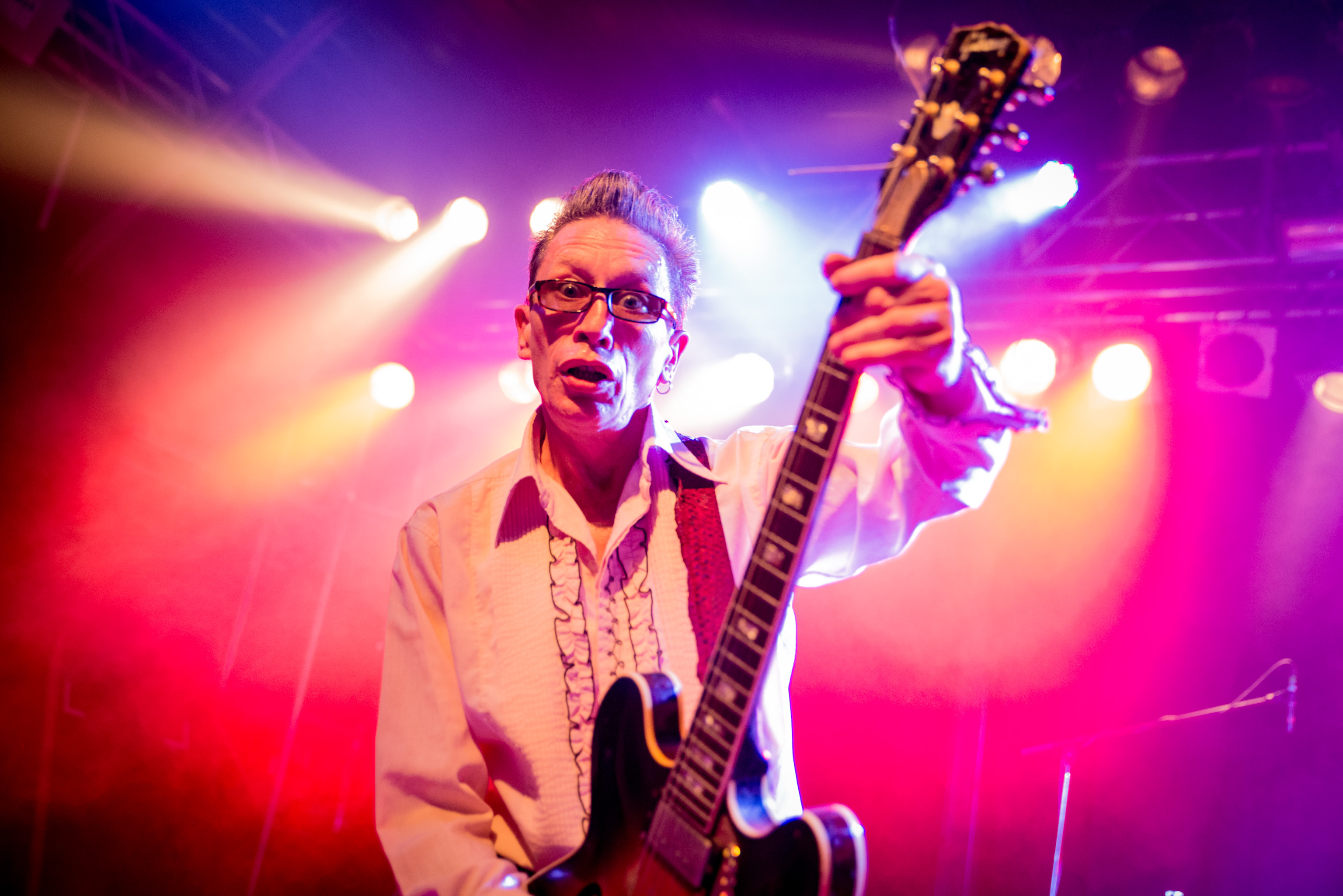
Paul "Thwak" Laventhol

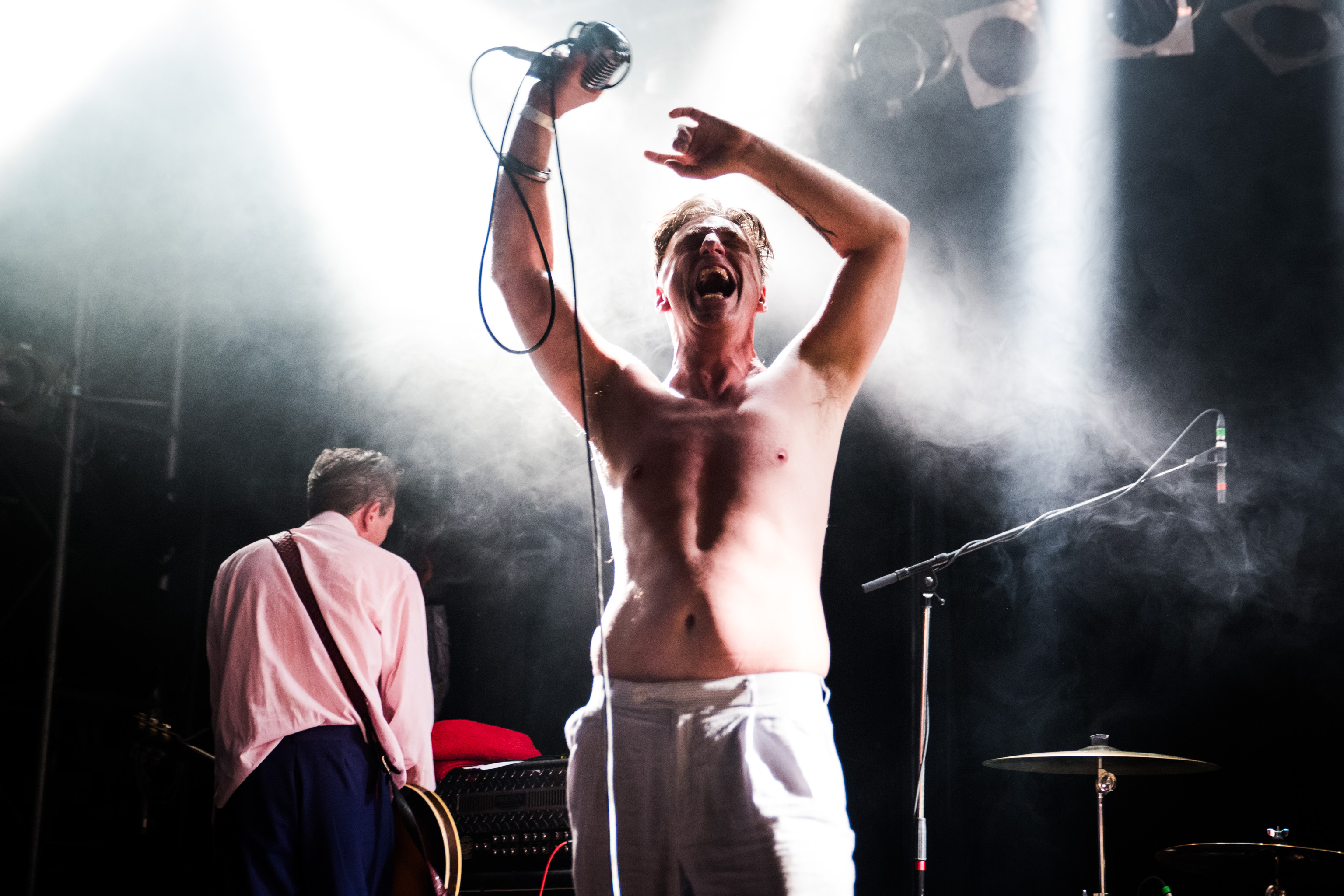
Gary "Smeg" Cayton

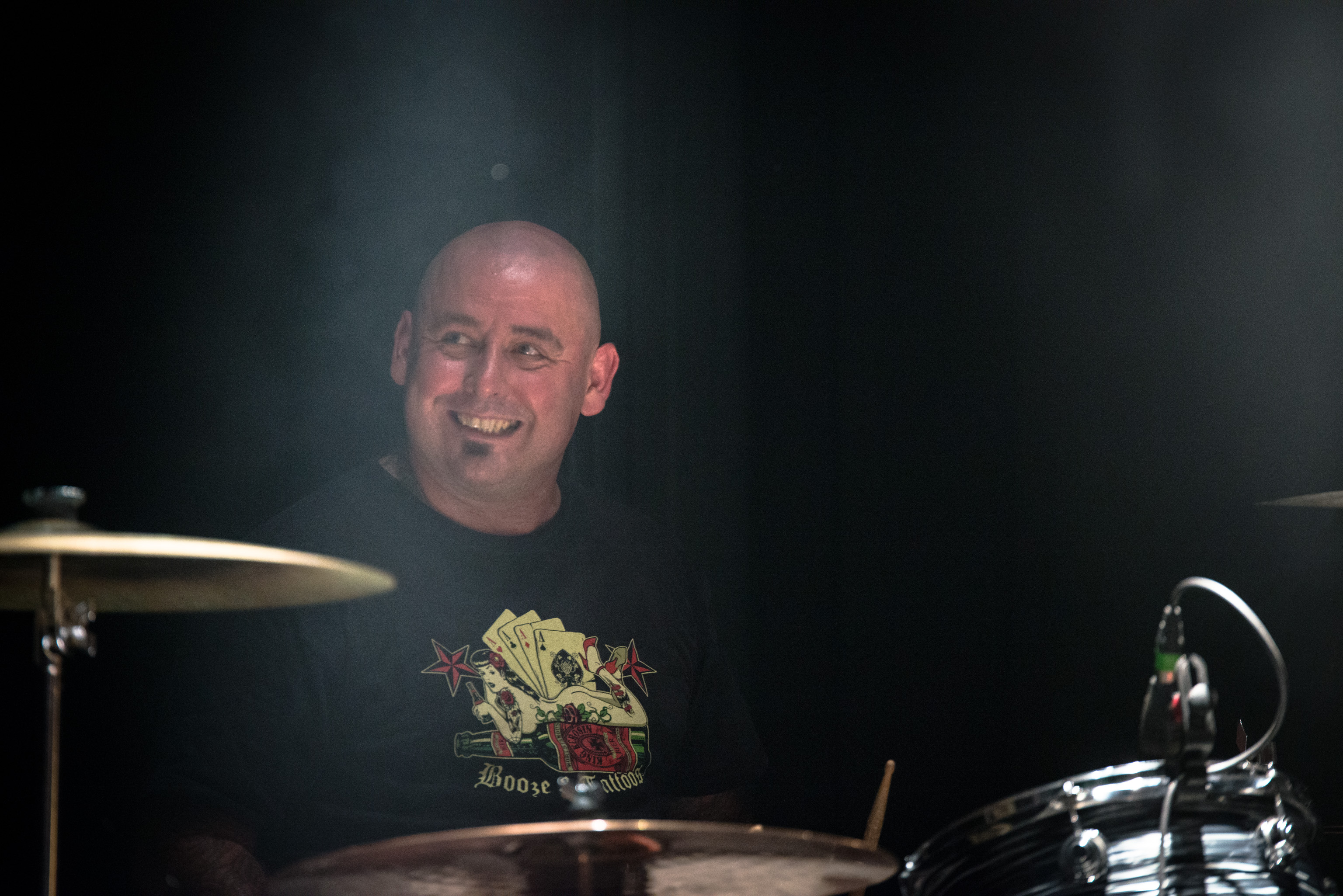
Gaff

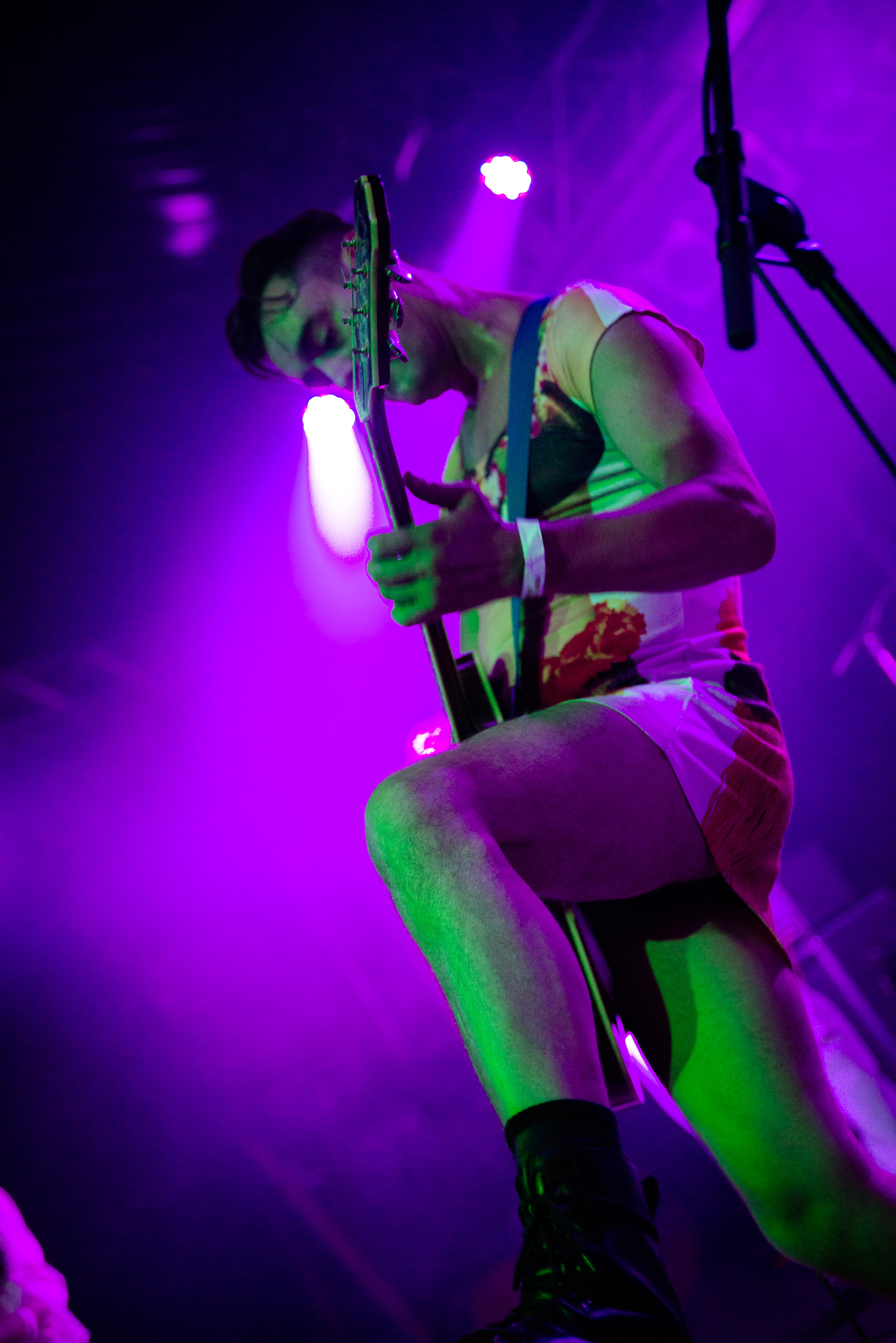
Eli Irvine

== Discography ==
=== Singles ===
Year	Month	A-side	B-side	UK	Record Label
1982	N/K	"Zulu Beat"	"Rockin' Kurt"	#153	Thin Sliced Records
1983	October	"Destination Zululand"	"She's as Hairy"	#36	Stiff Records
1984	April	"Mack the Knife"	"Wreck a Party Rock"	#55	Stiff Records
1984	August	"Banana Banana"	"Bo Diddley Goes East"	#54	Stiff Records
1985	June	"Billy"	"Back on the Dole"	#81	Stiff Records
1985	September	"Road to Rack n Ruin"	"Poppa Wobbler"	#94	Stiff Records
1985	November	"Slammers"	"Ape Hour"	#102	Stiff Records
1986	November	"America"	"High and Mighty"	#73	Polydor
1987	May	"Land of Ring Dang Do" / "Zulu Beat"	"Horatio" / "Gather Your Limbs"	#67	Polydor
1988	February	"Bye Bye Baby"	"Prussian Stomp" – (as 'The Kurts')	#135	GWR

=== Albums ===
Year	Title	UK	Record Label
1983	Ooh Wallah Wallah	#99	Stiff Records
1986	Big Cock	#50	Stiff Records
1988	The Last Will & Testicle	dnc	GWR
1994	Poor Man's Dream	dnc	Demon Records
2021	Best of Live	dnc	Secret Records Limited

=== Compilation albums ===
Year	Title	Label
1985	Road to Rack and Ruin	Ralph Records (US); Stiff Records (Japan)
1989	Live & Rockin	
1990	Destination Demoland	
2001	Alcoholic Rat	
	Live and Unreleased	
2009	Ooh Wallah Wallah (CD/DVD)	Jungle Records
2012	Zulu Beat (CD/DVD)	Secret Records

== See also ==
- List of psychobilly bands
