= Stiff Records =

British record label

- Parent company: Universal Music Group (label); Concord (American back catalogue)
- Founded: August 1976
- Founder: Dave Robinson; Jake Riviera
- Status: Active
- Distributor: Universal Music Group
- Genre: Pub rock; punk rock; new wave
- Country of origin: United Kingdom
- Official website: stiff-records.com

Stiff Records is a British independent record label formed in London by Dave Robinson and Jake Riviera. Originally active from 1976 to 1986, the label was reactivated in 2007.

Established at the outset of the punk rock boom, Stiff signed various punk rock and new wave acts such as Nick Lowe, the Damned, Lene Lovich, Wreckless Eric, Elvis Costello, Ian Dury, and Devo, also signing artists with significant crossover appeal such as Motörhead, Larry Wallis and Mick Farren. In the 1980s, with most of their early signings having moved on, the label found commercial success with Madness, The Pogues, Tracey Ullman, The Belle Stars, Kirsty MacColl and others.

In December 2017, Universal Music Group acquired Stiff Records and ZTT Records. Razor & Tie, a division of the Concord Music Group, holds the American rights to the Stiff catalogue. The British rights to the Stiff catalogue were held by BMG Rights Management under Union Square Music until 2022, when Universal relaunched the Stiff and ZTT labels.

== History ==
Stiff Records logos

The original Stiff Records logo

Alternate version of the logo

Robinson and Riviera were well-known London music business characters. Robinson had briefly worked for Jimi Hendrix in the late 1960s and also managed minor pub rock band Brinsley Schwarz in the early 1970s, in which Nick Lowe was the bassist, vocalist and main songwriter; while Riviera had been an early manager for another pub rock band, Dr. Feelgood, from Essex. The label was started with a loan of £400 from Lee Brilleaux of Dr. Feelgood.

Originally, Stiff had been called Demon, but the phrase "It’s a stiff!" was more appropriate for the artists on the record label. Stiff found quick success. Its first release, on 14 August 1976, was a single (in the normal 7" vinyl 45 rpm format) by Nick Lowe, "So It Goes", B-side "Heart of the City", with the striking catalogue number BUY 1. That record sold 10,000 copies, but Stiff's next release, "Between The Lines" by Pink Fairies, sold only around half of that. Robinson and Riviera used money from their Advancedale management company to finance the release of what is generally accepted as the United Kingdom's first punk single, "New Rose" by The Damned, on 22 October 1976.

Early in 1977, Stiff Records picked up speed, signing Wreckless Eric, Ian Dury, and Elvis Costello, who had once been a part-time roadie for Brinsley Schwarz. Bigger sales followed, and a distribution deal with Island Records through EMI was set up. After arranging for Costello and Lowe to be signed directly to CBS Records' Columbia label, a similar deal was made with Arista who released Ian Dury's first album and the Live Stiffs Live album. The deal was short-lived and Stiff then made a deal with CBS Records for Stiff releases in the United States, at both the Columbia and Epic subsidiaries on the Stiff/Columbia and Stiff/Epic labels.

Robinson and Riviera were a fiery management combination, and after a series of disagreements, Riviera left Stiff in early 1978 to form the short-lived Radar Records, taking Elvis Costello, Nick Lowe and Yachts with him as a settlement package. Riviera's departure coincided with the end of the "5 Live Stiffs Tour", which showcased emerging star Ian Dury. Dury's album New Boots & Panties!! had raced up the charts and its sales kept the label in business over the following months. In 1979, Robinson signed Madness, who released albums from 1979 to 1984.

The next few years were the halcyon period, with many Top 20 single chart placings, including the label's first No. 1 single, "Hit Me with Your Rhythm Stick" by Ian Dury, and a number of other big-selling albums. Stiff expanded rapidly and moved its premises twice. It also continued to release dozens of obscure and uncommercial releases. For example, Stiff Records released the parody album The Wit & Wisdom of Ronald Reagan. That LP, on Magic Records, was completely silent on both sides, with Reagan's own slogan, "If it's a success it must be Magic!".

At the end of 1983, Island Records bought 50% of Stiff, and Robinson ran both labels. Island was short of money at the time and Robinson had to lend it £1,000,000 to fund the share purchase and pay the payroll. In 1984 Island Records released hit single "Relax" by Frankie Goes to Hollywood. Stiff signed The Pogues, but then Madness left to start their own label, Zarjazz. The Island deal failed and Dave Robinson regained control of the newly independent label in 1985. Hits by The Pogues and Furniture helped Stiff to survive another twenty months, but the underlying causes for the failure of the Island deal finally became too burdensome for Stiff. It was sold to ZTT in 1987.

In 2007, ZTT and its parent company SPZ Group reactivated the label. Stiff quickly broke one of the UK's hottest new indie acts, The Enemy. It then released a string of well-received albums of new work from legacy Stiff artists, including as Wreckless Eric, Henry Priestman, Any Trouble, and Chris Difford. Brand new acts signed to the label included The Tranzmitors and Eskimo Disco. Swedish designer Tobbe Stuhre was appointed official Stiff Records designer.

In 2008, Union Square Music released The Big Stiff Box Set.

== The Stiffs Tours ==
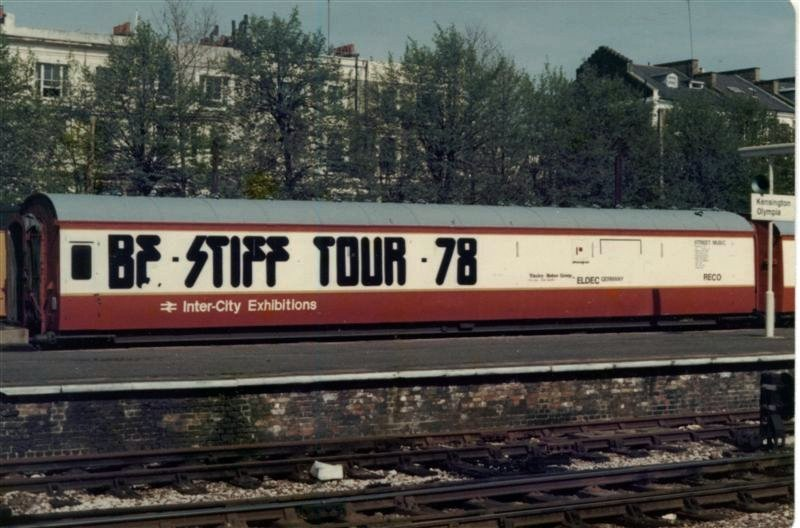
Part of the train that was used on the Be Stiff Route 78 Tour

Robinson and Riviera had arranged package tours ‒ such as the 1975 Naughty Rhythms tour ‒ for acts they managed before forming Stiff. The first tour, known as the Live Stiffs Tour or 5 Live Stiffs (3 October to 5 November 1977), comprised five bands: Elvis Costello and The Attractions, Ian Dury and the Blockheads, Wreckless Eric and The New Rockets, Nick Lowe's Last Chicken in the Shop, and Larry Wallis's Psychedelic Rowdies. Having signed all the named artists as individuals, bands had to be formed in order to tour: these were largely based on the session musicians used for the artists' solo records. There were 18 musicians on the tour, several doubling up, e.g. Dury playing drums for Wreckless Eric while the last two "bands" had the same line up (Nick Lowe, Larry Wallis, Dave Edmunds, Terry Williams, Pete Thomas and Penny Tobin).

The original idea was that the running order would rotate each night, but Dury and Costello were clearly the strongest acts. Costello played mostly new material and cover versions, rather than numbers from his recently released album My Aim is True, so the gigs usually ended with most of the artists on stage performing Dury's "Sex & Drugs & Rock & Roll". A live album titled Live Stiffs Live and a video of the tour were produced, but the tour only covered the UK.

After the departure of Riviera, Robinson arranged a second tour, the Be Stiff or the Be Stiff Route 78 tour, from October to November 1978 (UK), again comprising five acts; Wreckless Eric, Lene Lovich, Jona Lewie, Mickey Jupp, and Rachel Sweet. The mainland section of the UK tour was undertaken by train and the Irish section by coach, and then continued on to the USA without Jupp, who was afraid of flying. The artists contributed to an EP with cover versions of the Devo song, and early Stiff single, "Be Stiff".

The final tour, the Son of Stiff Tour 1980, comprised Ten Pole Tudor, Any Trouble, Dirty Looks, Joe "King" Carrasco and the Crowns, and The Equators. Undertaken by bus, this European tour was not successful. The tour led to a 12" EP Son of Stiff Tour 1980 (SON 1) and a short movie directed by Jeff Baynes. The movie has not been released for sale, but was shown on BBC4 in September 2006.

== Marketing and design ==
The label's marketing and advertising was often provocative and witty, billing itself as "The World's Most Flexible Record Label". Other slogans were "We came. We saw. We left", "If It Ain't Stiff, It Ain't Worth a Fuck", and "When You Kill Time, You Murder Success" (printed on promotional wall clocks). On the label of Stiff's sampler compilation Heroes & Cowards was printed: "In '78 everyone born in '45 will be 33-1/3". A very early Stiff sampler album, A Bunch of Stiff Records, introduced the slogan, "If they're dead, we'll sign them" and "Undertakers to the Industry".

Stiff also produced eccentric but highly effective promotional campaigns, such as the three package tours in 1977 (Live Stiffs), 1978 (Be Stiff) and 1980 (Son of Stiff), Elvis Costello's "street performance" outside CBS Records.

Barney Bubbles was responsible for much of the graphic art associated with the early Stiff releases.

== Label artists ==
- The Adverts
- Alberto y Lost Trios Paranoias
- Alvin Stardust
- Any Trouble
- The Belle Stars
- The Bongos
- Billy Bremner
- Joe "King" Carrasco & the Crowns
- The Catch
- Elvis Costello
- The Damned
- Department S
- Desmond Dekker
- Devo
- Dr. Feelgood
- Ian Dury and the Blockheads
- Electric Guitars
- The Enemy
- The Feelies
- Fingerprintz
- Furniture
- Ian Gomm
- Richard Hell and The Voidoids
- Jakko
- Mickey Jupp
- King Kurt
- Jona Lewie
- Lew Lewis
- Lene Lovich
- Nick Lowe
- Kirsty MacColl
- Madness
- The Members
- The Mint Juleps
- Motörhead
- Humphrey Ocean and the Hardy Annuals
- John Otway
- Graham Parker and The Rumour
- Pink Fairies
- Plasmatics
- Plummet Airlines
- The Pogues
- Pointed Sticks
- The Dubliners
- The Prisoners
- Roogalator
- The Sports
- Dave Stewart
- Rachel Sweet
- Bobby Tench
- Tenpole Tudor
- Sam and the Womp
- Sean Tyla and Tyla Gang
- The Stiffs
- Tracey Ullman
- The Undead
- The Untouchables
- Max Wall
- Larry Wallis
- Wazmo Nariz
- Wreckless Eric
- Yachts
- Yello

== See also ==
- Stiff Records discography
- 2 Tone
