= Allan Jones (editor) =

British music journalist and editor (born 1951)

Allan Jones (born 1951 or 1952) is a British music journalist and editor. Following university, Jones took a job in the stockroom of Hatchards on Piccadilly. While he was there he applied for a writing job at the music weekly Melody Maker with a letter that concluded, "Melody Maker needs a bullet up its arse. I’m the gun – pull the trigger." He joined the staff in 1974 and became editor ten years later. In 1977, Black Sabbath guitarist Tony Iommi dragged Jones from a Glasgow hotel into a bloody fight over an interview that the journalist published about him. During Jones's tenure as editor Melody Maker provided early publicity for bands ranging from the Stone Roses to Pearl Jam. One of his most significant early decisions was to resist the publisher's instruction to put Kajagoogoo on the cover, choosing instead the Smiths.

In 1997 Jones left Melody Maker to found and edit Uncut, a monthly magazine covering music and films. He was still editor as of 2022. Uncut won Consumer Specialist Magazine of the Year and International Consumer Magazine of the Year PPA Awards in 2003, and Consumer Specialist Magazine of the Year in 2004.

Media offices
Preceded by Michael Oldfield	Editor of Melody Maker; 1984–1997	Succeeded by Mark Sutherland
