= Ezra Furman =

American musician

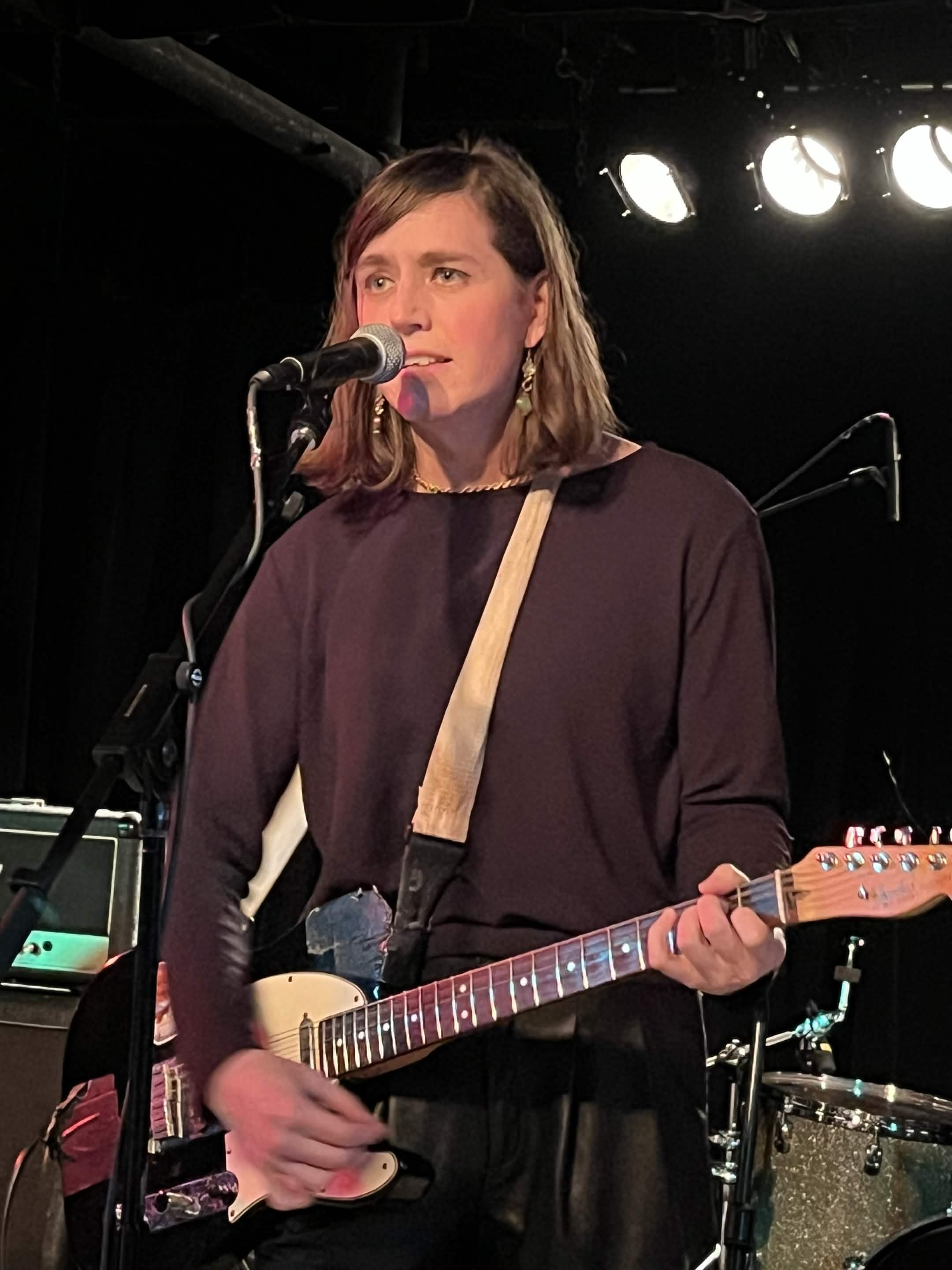
- Furman in 2026

Background information
- Born: September 5, 1986 (age 40); Chicago, Illinois, U.S.
- Genres: Art pop; rock and roll; alternative pop; indie pop; indie folk
- Occupations: Musician, songwriter
- Instruments: Guitar, vocals, harmonica
- Years active: 2006–present
- Labels: Bar/None Records; Bella Union
- Website: www.ezrafurman.com

Liz Furman (born September 5, 1986), known professionally as Ezra Furman, is an American musician and songwriter.

Furman was the lead singer and guitarist of Ezra Furman and the Harpoons, formed in 2006, which ended with Mysterious Power (2011). Her subsequent work has included the albums Day of the Dog (2013), Perpetual Motion People (2015), Transangelic Exodus (2018), All of Us Flames (2022), and Goodbye Small Head (2025) as well as parts of the soundtrack for all four seasons of the Netflix series Sex Education.

== Early life ==
Furman is Jewish. Her father is from a Jewish family, and her mother converted to Judaism. She has three siblings. Her younger brother Jonah was the lead singer and bassist of the Boston-based rock band Krill, which broke up in 2015. Her elder brother Noah is a visual artist who designed the cover of the Harpoons album Banging Down the Doors.

Furman began attending the rabbinical school of Hebrew College in Newton, Massachusetts, planning to become a rabbi and later dropped out, saying in an interview "I tried to be in rabbinical school and I dropped out, but I am trying to be both a spiritual person and a leader of the Jewish people in some way. The title 'rabbi' is the official way, but you don't need to have a title to do these things and create literature and gather your people."

By 2016, Furman was observing Shabbat while touring, avoiding Friday-night performances and Saturday travel, and putting on tefillin and studying the weekly Torah portion on the road.

== Career ==
=== Ezra Furman and the Harpoons ===
Ezra Furman and the Harpoons was a four-piece rock band active between 2006 and 2011. The band consisted of Ezra Furman (vocals, guitar), Job Mukkada (bass guitar), Adam Abrutyn (drums), and Andrew "Drew" Langer (guitar). They formed at Tufts University in 2006. They released four albums: the self-released Beat Beat Beat (2006), followed by Banging Down the Doors (2007), Inside the Human Body (2008) and Mysterious Power (2011). The group broke up in 2011, and Furman began touring as a solo artist. After their contract with Minty Fresh Records expired, the band released a self-produced compilation album in 2009, Moon Face: Bootlegs and Road Recordings 2006–2009, which included live recordings and some of Furman's solo work.

=== The Year of No Returning ===
Ezra Furman and the Visions
- Also known as: Ezra Furman and the Boyfriends
- Genres: Indie rock, psychedelic rock
- Years active: 2012–present
- Labels: Bar/None Records; Bella Union
- Members: Ezra Furman; Jorgen Jorgensen; Ben Joseph; Sam Durkes; Tim Sandusky

After touring in support of the album Mysterious Power, Furman recorded a solo album, entitled The Year of No Returning, without a label. Furman raised money through Kickstarter to fund the recording and self-release of the album. The album was recorded at Studio Ballistico, located at the time in the attic of the house Furman was living in, and produced by Tim Sandusky, who owned both the house and the studio. The album was released in February 2012. At the end of the year, Furman signed to Bar/None Records, who re-released The Year of No Returning in the summer of 2013.

The touring band Ezra Furman and the Boy-Friends formed in spring of 2012, and toured in support of The Year of No Returning. The band consisted of Jorgen Jorgensen (bass), Ben Joseph (keyboard, guitar), and Sam Durkes (drums). Tim Sandusky (saxophone) joined in 2013.

=== Day of the Dog ===
Furman released Day of the Dog in October 2013, also produced by Tim Sandusky, recorded at Studio Ballistico and released through Bar/None Records. This album got Furman notable press in the UK, receiving a 5/5 review in The Guardian by Michael Hann: "Ezra Furman has made an album of classicist rock'n'roll that never feels like an exercise, but a living, breathing piece of self expression", and an 8/10 review in NME: "A bratty, ragged take on New York Dolls, Spector-era Ramones and E Street Band carnival rock. An unexpected gem."

The band toured the UK in 2014 and were met with positive press. "The punk-fired rock'n'roller isn't too cool to be touched by a richly deserved rave reception", wrote Malcolm Jack for The Guardian, giving the show a five-star review. The tour finished in the autumn with a sold-out gig at Scala in London in September 2014.

=== Perpetual Motion People ===
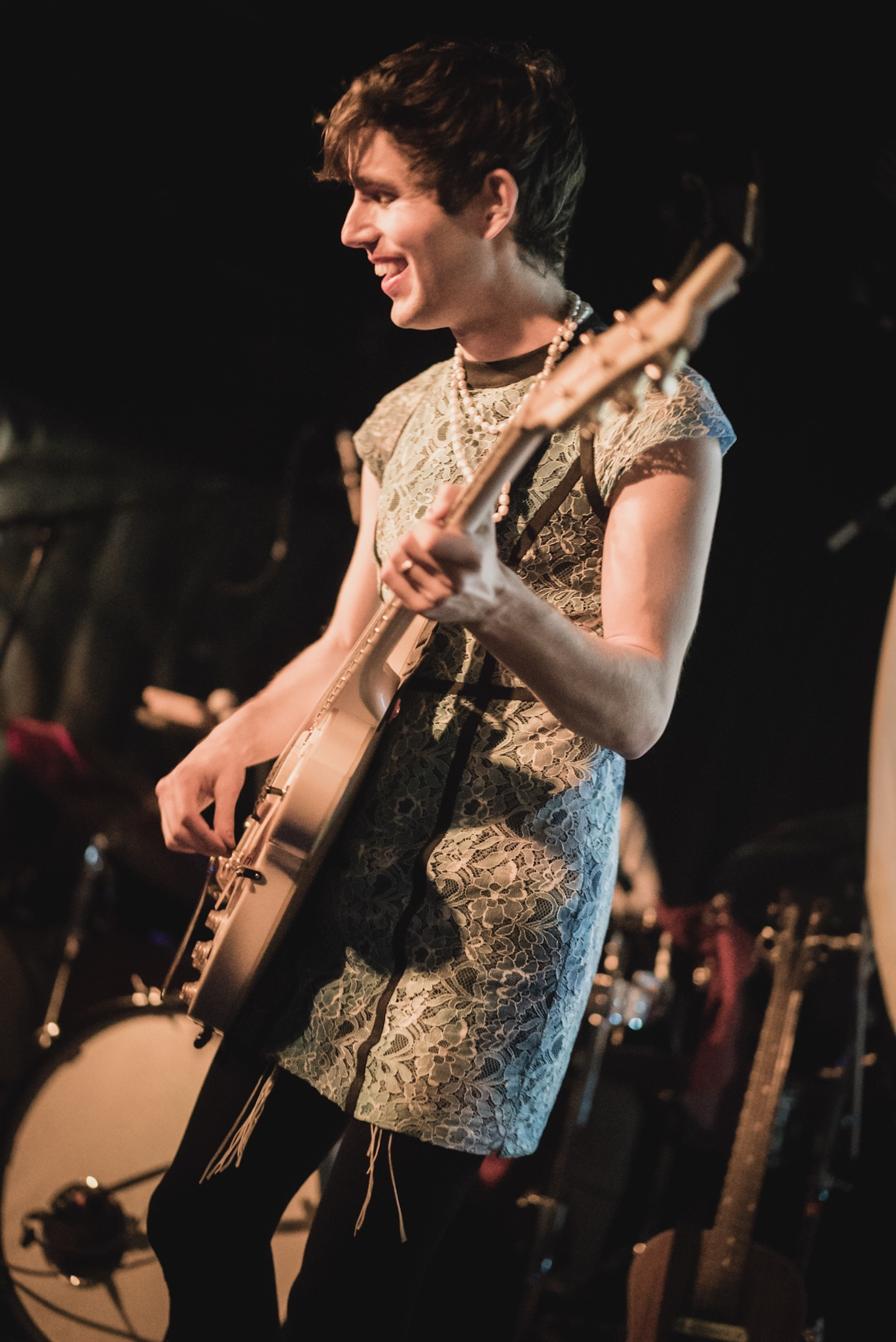
Furman in 2018

In early 2015, Furman signed to Bella Union and on April 27, announced that a new album, Perpetual Motion People, would be released on July 6 in the UK and Europe, and on July 10 in the US. Aided by positive critical reviews, Perpetual Motion People peaked in the UK charts on its entry week at number 23. A series of concerts in Europe and the US took place to coordinate with the release of the album.

In 2016, Furman released the EP Big Fugitive Life, saying it felt like the "end of a chapter, musically" and calling the collection a "group of our favourite orphaned songs", four of which missed out on inclusion on Perpetual Motion People, and two which came from the time of The Year of No Returning.

In September 2017, Furman's social media posts indicated that the Boy-Friends, active since 2012, had been renamed or reformed as the Visions. There was no change made to the line-up of Ben Joseph, Jorgen Jorgensen, Sam Durkes, and Tim Sandusky.

=== Transangelic Exodus ===
Transangelic Exodus, Furman's seventh album, was released February 9, 2018. The album follows a narrative of Furman and an angel on the road, running away from an oppressive government. The same year, 33⅓ published a book by Furman about Lou Reed's album Transformer.

=== Twelve Nudes ===
Furman's eighth album, Twelve Nudes, was released August 30, 2019. The album was inspired by her anger at the perceived injustices of the Trump administration and late capitalism, as well as her Jewish and transgender identities. She recruited John Congleton as producer for the album.

=== All of Us Flames ===
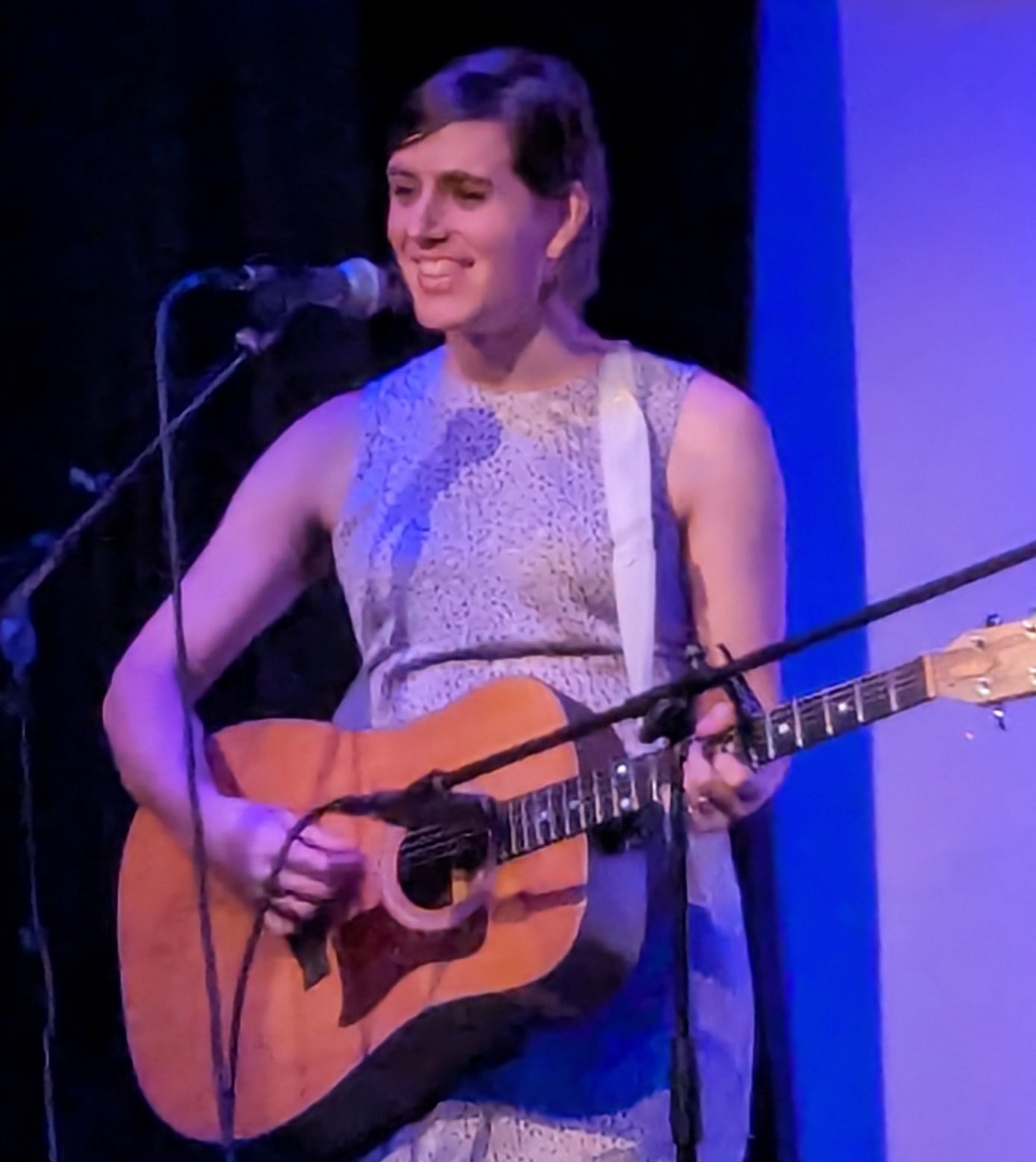
Furman in 2023

Furman released her ninth album, All of Us Flames, also produced by Congleton, in 2022. Its themes and topics included gender envy, also drawing connections between transgender oppression and Jewish exile. Pitchfork wrote that the album "feels like the most complete picture yet of Ezra Furman as a songwriter: genres fluidly co-existing with one another, projecting a fearless image while struggling with her own internal fearfulness", and compared parts of the album to Bruce Springsteen, Future Islands and Perfume Genius. NME gave the album three stars, writing that it felt "a little heavy and dragging", but that "where it works best is that clear marriage of anger and aspiration, interwoven with Furman's melodic drawl, musical tenderness and reverb."

In 2023, Furman announced that she would be taking a hiatus from touring, citing "a popular explosion of transphobia", "increasingly corporate-owned music venues", "COVID-19" and "the demands of motherhood" that had led to "pressure and exhaustion" upon her. She released Sex Education: Songs from Season 4, an EP of three songs made specifically for the fourth and final season of Sex Education, her music having been featured in every season of the show.

=== Goodbye Small Head ===
Furman announced her tenth studio album Goodbye Small Head in February 2025 with the single "Grand Mal", also announcing a UK and North American tour. The title of the album references a line from the 1999 Sleater-Kinney single "Get Up", whereas "Grand Mal" refers to an antiquated term for a seizure. She has described the record as "an orchestral emo prog-rock record sprinkled with samples", with 12 songs that portray "12 variations on the experience of completely losing control, whether by weakness, illness, mysticism, BDSM, drugs, heartbreak or just living in a sick society with one's eyes open." Brian Deck, who had previously produced Harpoons albums Banging Down The Doors and Inside The Human Body, returned to produce this album.

== Personal life ==
Furman has a child. She resides in Somerville, Massachusetts.

Furman is bisexual, and uses she/her and they/them pronouns. She came out as a transgender woman in late April 2021. Prior to this, she identified as genderqueer. In July 2025 Furman stated she is also using the name Liz.

== Discography ==
=== Albums ===
==== Ezra Furman and the Harpoons ====
- Banging Down the Doors (2007)
- Inside the Human Body (2008)
- Mysterious Power (2011)

==== Solo ====
- The Year of No Returning (2012)
- Day of the Dog (2013)
- Perpetual Motion People (2015)
- Transangelic Exodus (2018)
- Twelve Nudes (2019)
- All of Us Flames (2022)
- Goodbye Small Head (2025)

=== Extended plays ===
- Songs by Others (2016)
- Big Fugitive Life (2016)
- Jam in the Van (2018)

=== Singles ===
- "My Zero"/"Caroline Jones" (2013)
- "Restless Year" (2015)
- "Lousy Connection" (2015)
- "Driving Down to LA" (2017)
- "Unbelievers" (2018)
- "Calm Down aka I Should Not Be Alone" (2019)
- "Forever in Sunset" (2022)
- "Grand Mal" (2025)
- "One Hand Free" (2025)
