= That's How I Got to Memphis (album) =

Studio album by Kara Grainger
- Released: 3 October 2025
- Studio: Royal Studios
- Genre: Blues; soul; R&B
- Length: 36:11
- Label: Red Parlor, Station House Records
- Producer: Lawrence "Boo" Mitchell

Kara Grainger chronology
Living with Your Ghost (2018)	That's How I Got to Memphis (2025)

Professional ratings
Review scores
Source	Rating
Blues Rock Review	9/10 stars

That's How I Got to Memphis is the fifth solo studio album by Nashville-based blues rock musician from Australia, Kara Grainger. It was released on 3 October 2025 by Red Parlor.

== Development ==
The album was produced by Lawrence "Boo" Mitchell, recorded in Memphis and Nashville, working with the Hi Rhythm Section. Grainger selected "Love Played a Game" to pay tribute to Ann Peebles. "Texas Blues" was inspired by some Texas blues musicians, Freddie King, Stevie Ray Vaughan, and Smokin' Joe Kubek.

== Track listing ==
No.	Title	Writer(s)	Length
1.	"Texas Blues"	Kara Grainger, Dany Franchi, Don Ritter	4:44
2.	"That's How I Got to Memphis"	Tom T. Hall	4:07
3.	"Light Your Fire"	Grainger, Mark Punch	3:32
4.	"Wake Up with You"	Grainger, Craig Lackey, Daniel Ness, Ken Veltz	4:20
5.	"Mama Said"	Grainger	5:05
6.	"Love Played a Game"	Ann Peebles, Don Bryant, Fred Hodges	3:18
7.	"Doodle Loop (World Is a Bit Little Under the Weather)"	Leo Nocentelli, Allen Toussaint	3:23
8.	"Same Old River"	Grainger, Lackey, John Cirillo	3:35
9.	"Lessons"	Grainger	4:07
Total length:			36:11

== Personnel ==
Musicians

- Kara Grainger - vocals, guitar
- Lina Beach - rhythm guitar
- Leroy Hodges - bass
- Lannie McMillan - tenor saxophone
- Kirk Smothers - baritone saxophone
- Marc Franklin - trumpet
- Rev. Charles Hodges - Hammond organ
- Archie Turner - Wurlitzer
- Bobby Chase - viola, violin
- Alex Krew - cello
- Jackie Bristow - background vocals
- Louis Grainger - background vocals
- Candise Marshall - background vocals
- Sharisse Norman - background vocals
- Shontelle Norman - background vocals

Production

- Produced & Engineered by Lawrence "Boo" Mitchell
- Mixed by David Hagen
- Mastering by Hans Dekline
- Mastered by William Bowden
- Assistant recording engineer by Grace Ritter
