= Kara Grainger =

- Born: Kara Grainger; Balmain, Sydney, Australia
- Genres: Blues rock, soul blues, roots rock
- Occupations: Singer-songwriter, guitarist
- Instruments: Guitar, vocals
- Years active: 1996–present
- Labels: Station House Records, Eclecto Groove Records, Craving Records
- Formerly of: Papa Lips, Grainger
- Website: www.karagrainger.com

Kara Grainger is an Australian soul blues and roots rock singer-songwriter, based out of Nashville, Tennessee, United States. She played with the Papa Lips band starting in 1994. In 1998, they were awarded the "Best New Band" award at the Australian Blues Music Awards. They changed their name to Grainger in 1998 and continued to play together until 2001. She signed as a solo artist with Craving Records in 2006.

== Early life ==
Grainger was always singing, and started learning how to play the guitar at age 12, improvising by her mid-teens. Grainger taught herself to play while listening to musicians such as Etta James, John Lee Hooker, Stevie Ray Vaughan, and Little Feat. She grew up in Balmain, a suburb of Sydney, Australia, known for its pubs and live music venues that caters to jazz and blues music. She played in several bands during secondary school, and was encouraged by a teacher to perform live, and she took guitar lessons from a local instructor, Mark Williams who had connections to professional musicians, which lead to regular opportunities to play at one of Sydney's premiere music venues, The Basement.

== Career ==
=== Bands: Papa Lips and Grainger ===
In 1994, when Grainger was 16 and just out of Balmain High School, she formed the band Papa Lips with her brother Mitch Grainger who had recently left his previous band, the Bondi Cigars. Papa Lips was a Blues & Roots band fronted by the Graingers, but also included Declan Kelly on drums, Rowan Lane on bass, Danny Guerrero on percussion, and Clayton Doley on keyboards. John Brewster managed the band along with Mitch.

Papa Lips recorded and released one EP in 1996, Harmony, and one album in 1998, High Time Now, both distributed by Festival Records. They toured extensively on Australia's east coast, and played major Australian music festivals such as the Byron Bay Blues & Roots Festival, the East Coast Blues and Roots Festival and Woodford Folk Festival. In 1998 Papa Lips were awarded, "Best New Band" at the Australian Blues Music Awards.

In 1998 the band was introduced to the producer Harry Vanda of The Easybeats and AC/DC fame and signed by Albert Productions. The band changed their name to Grainger and were in the studio for a period of two years recording an EP, "Sky Is Falling", and an unreleased album. In September 2001 Kara Grainger traveled along with her brother Mitch to New York to meet with American record labels, Atlantic Records, Sony BMG, Virgin Records and Elektra Records. The pair arrived in Manhattan on 9 September and were witness to the 11 September attacks. This brought on a period of reflection and the band was soon to be disbanded with Kara and her brother Mitch deciding to take separate musical paths.

=== Solo career ===
After separating from the band Grainger, Kara Grainger played briefly with the Steve Prestwich Band in 2005. In 2006, Grainger signed as a solo artist with the Australian label Craving Records, releasing her solo EP Secret Soul in 2006. The label encouraged her to go to the United States to record her first solo album, and in 2008 she moved to Los Angeles, and released her debut solo album, Grand and Green River. The album charted on the top 40 Americana charts for 38 straight weeks, and won first prize for a Roots album in 2008 from the Indie Acoustic Project (IAP). Grainger was invited to perform at the Folk Alliance International in 2006, 2007, and 2008 in Austin, Texas, and Memphis, Tennessee.

In 2011, Grainger released her second album, L.A. Blues. The album was mostly a cover album, with only two original tracks, while the covers paid tribute to the early blues musicians who influenced her. Grainger toured throughout the US, Europe, Australia, and Asia, and has opened for several well-known artists, such as Buddy Guy, Marc Cohn, Peter Frampton, Robert Plant, Heart, Taj Mahal, and Jonny Lang.

Shiver & Sigh was recorded and released in 2013. Members of Bonnie Raitt's touring band, James Hutchinson and Mike Finnigan, supported Grainger in the recording of the album. Grainger's brother, harmonica player Mitch Grainger supports her on her cover of Robert Johnson's "C'mon in My Kitchen". Graham Clarke, of Blues Bytes states that the album is "a smooth, sensuous, slow burner of a release, as Kara Grainger shows that you can be as effective with a whisper as with a scream. This is a marvelous set of soulful blues that really hits home."

On 1 June 2018, Grainger released Living with Your Ghost, on Station House Records.

On 3 October 2025, Grainger released That's How I Got to Memphis.

== Personal life ==
Grainger currently lives in the US in Nashville, Tennessee. When she first moved to L.A., California, she did not anticipate staying beyond a year, but she found herself playing with some musicians she knew from albums. After living there for six months, she decided to make the move permanent. The American musicians were pushing themselves to improve and take it up a level, while she felt that many of the Australian musicians were laid-back. Grainger moved to Texas for a while, where she got to play with Eric Johnson. Grainger moved back to Los Angeles for a period of time, where she eventually found herself at home with the community. In her own words, "It took me a while to settle there but at the same time, it has the most amazing facilities, the best recording studios, no end of great musicians."

== Discography ==
=== Papa Lips album ===
==== High Time Now ====
Album details
- Release date: 1998
- Genre: Roots, soul, blues, funk
- Label: LipSync Records
- Produced by Papa Lips, Phil Punch, Trent Williamson; Recorded at Electric Avenue & Vault Studios by Trent Williamson; Mixed at Electric Avenue by Phil Punch; Mastered by Phil Punch, Robin Gist
- Kara Grainger - lead vocals (tracks 1, 2, 3, 5, 7, 9, 10, 13), lead guitar (tracks 2, 5, 10, 13); Mitch Grainger - lead vocal (track 6), lead guitar (tracks 3, 6, 7, 8), guitar, harmonica; Rowan Lane - lead vocals (track 12), low down vocal (track 13), bass guitar; Declan Kelly - lead vocal (track 4), drum; Danny Guerrero - lead vocal (track 8), percussion
- Special Guests: Clayton Doley - Hammond organ, piano; Roger Janes - Trombone (track 4); Trent Williamson - lap steel guitar (track 12); Gustavo Fernandez & Gustavo Cereijo - Candombe drums (track 12)
Tracks

No.	Title	Length
1.	"High Time Now"	3:47
2.	"Dek' Da"	4:32
3.	"Love Miracle"	5:05
4.	"You Ain't Gotta"	3:29
5.	"In Your Arms"	3:47
6.	"Rain"	3:12
7.	"I'll Be Free"	4:10
8.	"Todo El Mundo"	4:23
9.	"Stay with Me Tonight"	5:03
10.	"Never Give It Up"	5:05
11.	"Jam 1"	0:42
12.	"Just Got to Try"	4:57
13.	"Soul"	3:48
Total length:		52:01

=== Kara Grainger solo albums ===
==== Grand and Green River ====
Album details
- Release date: 24 June 2008
- Genre: Blues rock, soul music, country blues, Americana
- Label: Craving Records
- Produced by David Kalish; Co-Produced by Kara Grainger, Barrie Maguire; Additional Production by Paul McKercher (track 8); Engineered by Mark Johnson, David Kalish, Shane Smith; Mixed by David Kalish, Barrie Maguire, also Joe Chiccarelli (tracks 1, 2, & 10) and Paul McKercher (track 8); Mastered by Joe Gastwirt, and also Oscar Gaona (track 8)
- Kara Grainger – vocals, electric guitar, lead guitar, slide guitar, acoustic guitar; Mitch Grainger – harmonica; David Kalish – electric guitar, acoustic guitar, dobro; Val McCullum – electric guitar; Barrie Maguire – bass, acoustic guitar; Craig Eastman – mandolin; Dan Rothchild – bass; Reggie McBride – bass, double bass; Jonathan Zwartz – double bass; Joel Guzman – piano, accordion, Hammond; Stuart Hunter – piano, Hammond; Jeff Young – Hammond, wurlitzer, clavinet, piano; Gary Ferguson, Pete Thomas, Richie Hayward, Hamish Stuart, Tom Breckline – drums; Jacob Cook, David Leach – percussion; Lee Thornburg – horn arrangement, trumpet, trombone; Paulie Cerra – saxophone; Arnold McCuller, David Lasley, Ernie Halter, Sky Nichols, Lara Goodridge – backing vocals
Tracks

No.	Title	Writer(s)	Length
1.	"What You Wanted"	Kara Grainger, David Kalish, SLIM (Ari Shine, Martyn LeNoble, Victor Indrizzo, Gavin MacKillop), John Fisher	3:37
2.	"On My Way" (featuring Amos Lee)	K. Grainger, Kalish, SLIM	3:07
3.	"Cannot Be Denied"	K. Grainger, Kalish	3:29
4.	"Dreamed I Was the Devil"	Charlie Terrell	4:09
5.	"I'm Going to Live the Life I Sing About in My Song"	Thomas A. Dorsey	4:17
6.	"Sky Is Falling"	K. Grainger	3:07
7.	"Holding On"	K. Grainger	4:00
8.	"Bring Me Back"	K. Grainger, Kalish, SLIM	3:43
9.	"Secret Soul"	K. Grainger	3:01
10.	"Struck in Love"	K. Grainger, Kalish, SLIM	3:15
Total length:			35:45

==== L.A. Blues ====
Album details
- Release date: 22 August 2011
- Genre: Blues rock
- Label: NewTrax Records
- Produced, engineered, mixed by Tom Weir; Recorded in Studio City Sound
- Kara Grainger – vocals, guitar, slide guitar; Mitch Grainger – harmonica; "Hutch" Hutchinson, Mary Beth Kedzior – bass; Stacey Lamont Sydnor – drums; Arlan Schierbaum – Hammond, Moog
Tracks

No.	Title	Writer(s)	Length
1.	"C'mon in My Kitchen"	Robert Johnson	4:17
2.	"Dust My Broom"	R. Johnson	4:25
3.	"Voodoo Woman"	Koko Taylor	4:17
4.	"Babe What You Want Me to Do"	Alline Bullock	4:26
5.	"I'll Make Love to You Anytime"	J. J. Cale	4:01
6.	"Holding On"	Kara Grainger	4:29
7.	"Sky Is Falling"	K. Grainger	4:31
8.	"Come to Mama"	Earl Randle, Willie Mitchell	6:55
Total length:			37:22

==== Shiver & Sigh ====
Album details
- Release date: 16 July 2013
- Recorded: 10–16 December 2012
- Genre: Blues, roots, soul, Americana
- Label: Eclecto Groove Records, Delta Groove
- Produced, Engineered, and Mixed by David Z at the Hobby Shop Studios; Executive Produced by Randy Chortkoff; Additional Engineering by Andrew Murdock, David Spreng, Mike Lee, and also Ben Rosen for Tracks 3 & 9; Mastered by Ryan Foster; Artwork & Design by Joshua Temkin
- Kara Grainger – vocals, lead guitar, slide guitar; Mitch Grainger – harmonica; Kirk Fletcher, Josh Sklair – rhythm guitar; "Hutch" Hutchinson – bass; Mike Finnigan – keyboard; James Gadson, Jimi Bott – drums; Lenny Castro – percussion; The Pacific Coast Horns: Paulie Cerra – saxophone, horn arrangement; Paul Litteral – trumpet; George Stanford – trombone
Tracks

No.	Title	Writer(s)	Length
1.	"Little Pack of Lies"	Kara Grainger	4:27
2.	"Shiver & Sigh"	Kevin Bowe	4:22
3.	"Lost in You"	K. Grainger	4:10
4.	"Shut Down"	K. Grainger, Bruce McCabe	3:37
5.	"I'm Not Ready"	K. Grainger	3:32
6.	"No Way You Can Hurt Me Now"	Bruce McCabe	3:44
7.	"Holding Out for Love"	Mike Zito	4:06
8.	"C'mon in My Kitchen"	Robert Johnson	3:51
9.	"You're the One"	K. Grainger	3:25
10.	"Breaking Up Somebody's Home"	Al Jackson Jr., Timothy Matthews	4:12
11.	"Overdue for the Blues"	Wayne Perkins	3:52
Total length:			43:18

==== Living with Your Ghost ====
Album details
- Release date: 1 June 2018
- Genre: Roots, blues, soul
- Label: Station House Records
Tracks

No.	Title	Writer(s)	Length
1.	"Living with Your Ghost"	Kara Grainger	4:08
2.	"Working My Way Back Home"	Grainger	4:12
3.	"Man with Soul"	Grainger, Trevor Manear	3:40
4.	"Nowhere to Be Found"	Grainger	4:06
5.	"You're in New Orleans"	Grainger, Anders Osborne, Andrew Duhon	3:23
6.	"Groove Train"	Grainger, Osborne	4:40
7.	"Reason to My Verse"	Grainger	3:41
8.	"Broken Record"	Jackie Bristow, Mark Punch	3:43
9.	"Favourite Sin"	Grainger, Osborne, Julia King	3:42
10.	"Nobody But You"	Grainger	4:34
11.	"Love Will Get You Through the Door"	Grainger, Osborne	3:52
12.	"Freedom Song"	Grainger	6:01
Total length:			49:42

==== That's How I Got to Memphis ====
Album details
- Release date: 3 October 2025
- Genre: Blues, soul
- Label: Red Parlor Records
Tracks

No.	Title	Writer(s)	Length
1.	"Texas Blues"	Kara Grainger, Dany Franchi, Don Ritter	4:44
2.	"That's How I Got to Memphis"	Tom T. Hall	3:32
3.	"Light Your Fire"	Grainger, Mark Punch	3:32
4.	"Wake Up with You"	Grainger, C. Lackey, D. Ness, K. Veltz	4:20
5.	"Mama Said"	Grainger	5:05
6.	"Love Played a Game"	Ann Peebles, Don Bryant, Fred Hodges	3:18
7.	"Doodle Loop (World Is a Bit Little Under the Weather)"	Leo Nocentelli, Allen Toussaint	3:23
8.	"Same Old River"	Grainger, Lackey, J. Cirillo	3:35
9.	"Lessons"	Grainger	4:07
Total length:			36:11

=== EPs ===
==== Harmony (Papa Lips) ====
Album details
- Release date: 1996
- Genre: Roots, downtempo
- Label: LipSync Records
Tracks

No.	Title	Length
1.	"I'll Be Free"	4:11
2.	"What a Day"	3:43
3.	"Harmony"	3:33
4.	"I'm Still Around"	3:29
5.	"Got Me Movin'"	2:58
Total length:		17:54

==== Sky Is Falling (Grainger) ====
Album details
- Release date: 2002
- Genre: Roots
- Label: Coady Music, MGM Distribution
- Produced by Grainger; mastered by Don Bartley; mixed by Paul Hoare (track 1), David Hemming (tracks 2, 3, 4)
- Grainger consists of: Mitch Grainger – vocals, guitar; Kara Grainger – vocals, guitar; Declan Kelly – drums, percussion, backing vocals; Rowan Lane – bass, backing vocals
Tracks

All tracks are written by Grainger.

No.	Title	Length
1.	"Evil"	3:23
2.	"Ain't Going for That"	4:30
3.	"Sky Is Falling"	3:39
4.	"This Feeling"	4:07
Total length:		15:39

==== Secret Soul (Kara Grainger) ====
Album details
- Release date: 10 February 2006
- Genre: Roots rock, soul
- Label: Craving Records
- Formats: Digital, CD (limited)
- Recorded by Phil Punch at Electric Avenue, except "Secret Soul" recorded by Trent Williamson at 301 Studios
- Mixed by Brent Clark
- Kara Grainger – vocals, guitar; Mitch Grainger – harmonica; Stuart Hunter – piano, keyboards; Jonathan Zwartz – upright bass; Hamish Stuart – drums; Kimi Tepai, Jackie Bristow – backing vocals; Clayton Doley – keyboards (track 1); Tim Curnick – bass (track 1); Mark Punch – guitar (track 4)
Tracks

All tracks are written by Kara Grainger.

No.	Title	Length
1.	"Secret Soul"	3:41
2.	"Holding On"	6:00
3.	"Sky Is Falling"	4:35
4.	"River of Fire"	4:35
Total length:		18:51
