= Jinx Titanic =

- Jinx Titanic 2007

Background information
- Also known as: Jinx Titanic
- Born: John Patrick Kamys; September 21, 1968 (age 57); Chicago, Illinois, U.S.
- Genres: Punk rock Rockabilly; Pop rock Alternative rock Incidental music Theater Music
- Occupations: Composer, singer, songwriter, recording artist, author, actor, comedian
- Instrument: Voice piano keyboards
- Label: Big Dixie
- Website: Jinx Titanic; John Kamys

John Patrick Kamys (born September 21, 1968, Chicago, Illinois, United States), better known by his stage name Jinx Titanic, is an American composer, singer, songwriter, recording artist, and author, best known for his outrageous stage persona, and image as the beer-swilling, cigar-smoking, sexually-candid, lead singer of the eponymous rock band. Occasionally he will appear as a stage actor, movie actor, comedian, television personality, or host, and is also considered a notable member of the Queercore and Homocore movements.

== Biography ==
=== Pre Jinx Titanic ===
Before taking on the persona and public life of Jinx Titanic, Kamys worked regularly in Chicago as a composer and songwriter. His first score for theater was written in 1994 for Teatro Vista's production of Romulus Linney's play Ambrosio. Henry Godinez, Goodman Theatre resident artistic associate and curator of The Goodman's Latino Theater Festival played the title role. At the time, Godinez was also scheduled to direct Jose Rivera's new play Cloud Tectonics at the Goodman Theatre and asked Kamys to create the score. Cloud Tectonics was a critical success, considered one of the 10 best productions of 1995 by both The Chicago Tribune and The Chicago Sun Times, and Kamys went on to receive a Joseph Jefferson Award nomination for his score. Though he did not win the award at that time, eventually receiving the "Jeff" in 1998 for his work for El Paso Blue at the Next Theater Company, the success of Cloud Tectonics initiated a longstanding collaborative relationship between Kamys, Godinez. Teatro Vista, and The Goodman Theatre.

In 1999 he released his first solo recording, a clash of genres and pop-forms titled Supremacist. According to the review by author and syndicated columnist Gregg Shapiro, then a writer for the Windy City Times, and Outlines, the recording was "unabashedly sexy and powerful," with "moments of dark and unexpected beauty." Though sales of the recording were considerably small, the work was artistically solid enough to garner two GLAMA (Gay and Lesbian American Music Award) nominations for Best New Artist, and Out Song Trade. Trade a blend of alternative rock and Hip Hop would also appear in a Heavy Metal version on both Super 8 Cum Shot Volume II and JINX TITANIC Booted & Cuffed. Also from Supremacist the punk song Your Hearse Is Here would later be re-recorded for Super 8 Cum Shot Volume I, and eventually find its way onto the MTV show The Real World. Supremacist is currently out of print and unavailable in a digital format.

In 1999, he also wrote and played the lead (Logan John) in the alt-country/Americana musical Future City Homosexual Tells All "about a small town boy trying to do the big town thing." at The Theater Building in Chicago. Though the musical received favorable reviews, "an unforgettable character and some of the best and most memorable songs you are likely to hear for years to come," stated Chicago's Outlines, and "His raspy voice evoking Joe Cocker and his down-home songs recalling John Prine, Kamys offers a true-blue slice of Americana," declared Chicago Reader theater critic Lawrence Bommer, low attendance and high production costs would close the show in six weeks. However, his exploration of the Alt-Country/Americana sound and some of the songs from Future City Homosexual Tells All, would inform and inspire his second solo effort Guns (2001) and the single There Just Wont Be a Christmas This Year (2001) recorded by vocalist and actress Catherine Smitko.

=== Super 8 Cum Shot ===
Jinx Titanic, was born in May 2002 at a recording session at Chicago's Rax Trax Studios. Kamys had assembled four musicians to record under the band name Super 8 Cum Shot. He described the band as a "good-natured, bawdy and unforgettable punk/party/porno/pop experience," and dubbed its members, "the beer-swilling ambassadors of the orgasm." In keeping with the spirit of the band, each member was asked to choose a pseudonym. Kamys chose Jinx Titanic for himself. Super 8 Cum Shot Volume I was released July 31, 2002 with a performance and party at the historic Whisky a Go Go in Los Angeles, California. The original members of Super 8 Cum shot, performing on the recording are: John Kamys aka Jinx Titanic vocals, Jeff Kust aka G.I. Tarbaby Barbra guitar, Mitch Marlow aka Machine Gun Garafalo guitar, Chris Sewell aka Dax Malkovich bass, Timothy Ford aka Posey (t-mint) Parker drums.

Super 8 Cum Shot – January 2003

Super 8 Cum Shot quickly gathered a following among the underground culture, primarily due to the band's DIY punk aesthetic, and the boisterous, wildly sexual and raucous antics of front-man Titanic. Often cited for their superior musicianship, an early review called the players "dedicated rock n' rollers, with a commanding stage presence, respectable guitar riffs, and a unique sound all their own." And adding to the mix, were a plethora of surprising and provocative guests, including porn-stars, burlesque dancers, transvestites, circus acts and featured regulars the Lickity Split Radical Cheerleaders, a non-traditional, politically motivated genderfuck squad.

In February 2003 American music critic Jim DeRogatis solidified the band's credibility by inviting Titanic to be a guest on the radio show Sound Opinions. During the show, DeRogatis described Super 8 Cum Shot's music as "rip roaring garage rock but with a sort of show tune sensibility and these very, very, very funny lyrics," adding, "the songs are really wonderful melodically and they kick like the best garage rock should," and closed with, "you have to see Jinx Titanic live!" The following month, the band received its first national review in Unzipped, and journalist Pat Bonum crowned Titanic "a force to be reckoned with, both on stage, and in the sack." In May 2003 Super 8 Cum Shot Volume I received an OMA (Outmusic Award) nomination for Outstanding Recording by a Duo or a Group, and in July 2003 Titanic and the band, now a foursome, Jeff Kust having departed late in 2002 to pursue solo efforts, returned to Rax Trax Studios to record Super 8 Cum Shot Volume II.

In the summer of 2003, looking to create a truly alternative venue for live music, Titanic turned to the Chicago leather bar the Cell Block for support. According to book HOMOCORE The Loud and Raucous Rise Of Queer Rock, "They began hosting a monthly rock night: Super 8 Cum Shot kicks off the punk rock party with a short set before turning the stage over to three or four handpicked local bands."

Jinx Titanic at the CellBlock 2005

Titanic is quoted as saying, "though we dislike the labels 'homocore' and 'gay band' we see to it that bands with LGBT members are given the opportunity to showcase their material alongside bands with only heterosexual members." The series was tremendously successful, throughout its run, which ended in summer 2005. Following is a smattering of the bands and artists who have played in the series: Bang! Bang!, The Rotten Fruits, The Redwalls, Tijuana Hercules, Dead Electric, The Paperbacks, Masters of the Obvious, Mommy Can Wait, The Hot Behind You, The Countdown, The Stewed Tomatoes, Three Dollar Bill, Vortis, The Decibators, Enemy Sun, TAFKAV, The Pages, Johnny Dangerous, Ripley Caine, Scott Free, The Paper Bullets, Baby Kage, Polymer, San Andreas, Reagan National Crash Diet, and The Ike Reilly Assassination.

Super 8 Cum Shot Volume II was released in October 2003 with a performance and party at Man's Country, a notable gay bathhouse owned by Chuck Renslow, founder of International Mister Leather. The band continued to tour and perform throughout 2003 and into early 2004 as Super 8 Cum Shot but with further personnel changes. In November 2003 original bassist Chris Sewell aka Dax Malkovich left the band to concentrate on playing drums. He was replaced by Josh (Spike) Maguire bassist from the now-defunct metal band Dead Electric. Due to mounting difficulties imposed by the name Super 8 Cum Shot, Titanic decided to change the band name to the eponymous JINX TITANIC. The first performance of the band JINX TIANIC was March 31, 2004 at The Cell Block, Chicago. In June 2004 Titanic won the OMA for Outstanding Production for Super 8 Cum Shot Volume II. Soon after, personality conflicts began to escalate between Maguire and the band and in July 2004 he was replaced by Garrison Latimer formerly of the art-rock band Polymer. In September 2004 guitarist Mitch Marlow aka Machine Gun Garofalo left the band to pursue a career in artist management and was replaced by Jay Bennett aka Whisky Newman. In order to solidify the name change and insure a stable future for the "new" band, Titanic re-released Super 8 Cum Shot Volume II in early 2005 as JINX TITANIC Booted & Cuffed. The recording received the number 8 position in Out magazine columnist David Ciminelli's top 10 albums of 2005.

=== Solo ===
In January 2005, Titanic, who is openly bisexual, was invited to play the Queer Lounge at the Sundance Film Festival. This event marked the beginning of his affiliation with the Q Television Network, and in June 2005 he began working as a guest host and regular correspondent for the network, continuing to do so until Q Television closed its doors in late 2006. During this period, while retaining a band, Titanic repositioned himself as the solo artist Jinx Titanic. The April 2006 issue of Out magazine named Jinx Titanic one of the top five independent artists in the country. Stuporstardom!, released in April 2007 marked his first solo release as Jinx Titanic. It was recorded and mixed by Steve Albini at Electrical Audio in Chicago, Illinois in December 2006. Musicians performing on the recording are: John Kamys aka Jinx Titanic vocals and keyboards, Mitch Marlow aka Machine Gun Garafalo guitar, Jay Bennett aka Whisky Newman guitar, Pat Mallinger alto and tenor saxophones, Rob Kassinger aka Tamale Ringwald bass, and Timothy Ford aka Posey (t-mint) Parker drums. Artist/writer/video artist Kevin Evans contributed artwork, website and music videos based on several songs.

In April 2008, on the eve of embarking on trip to Haiti, Titanic gave a farewell concert in his native Chicago. Promoted as "The Last Jinx Titanic Show Ever," the concert did not so much signify an end to Kamys performing as Jinx Titanic as much as it did a period of career expansion.

The trip to Haiti, originally planned as a short get-away, inspired a second trip in May and laid the foundation for Kamys' foray into microcinema and multimedia – culminating in the experimental documentary Stirring Water, its title derived from the Haitian proverb "I stir water to make butter." Despite a severe bout of dengue fever, contracted while shooting in Haiti, the effects of which debilitated Kamys for several months, Stirring Water was completed in late 2008. It received its world premiere as a documentary finalist in March 2009 at the 11th annual Washington DC Independent Film Festival in a themed program created to explore the African Diaspora. Shot in and around Port-au-Prince, Stirring Water employed elements of classic newsreel style documentation, silent era intertitling, and a soundscape of field recordings and original music.

In June 2009 Kamys stepped out of the Jinx Titanic persona to release I Want Some Sun – a gospel tinged roots rock album. This marked a return to an earlier sound and the completion of several songs that had been started prior to the advent of Super 8 Cum Shot.

=== Jinx Titanic and Super 8 Cum Shot ===
In 2009 Big Dixie released the recordings 100% Pure Class, The Very Best of Jinx Titanic & Super 8 Cum Shot, (a tongue-in-cheek greatest-hits compilation), and Found in Trunk (Good and Bad Demos Live Junk & Oddities). Performances to support these releases sparked an open-door policy between Titanic and former members of Super 8 Cum Shot, who would now perform under the name Jinx Titanic & Super 8 Cum Shot. These lineups also included new members, bassist Jason Narducy, of The Bob Mould Band, and formerly Verbow and Jason & Allison and drummer Larry Beers.

=== Alpine Skiing at the 1952 Winter Olympics ===
In 2010, Kamys formed the pseudo-group Alpine Skiing at the 1952 Winter Olympics to serve as a catch-all heading for recording projects that could not be defined as either Jinx Titanic & Super 8 Cum Shot or John Kamys. The name, Alpine skiing at the 1952 Winter Olympics was chosen randomly, using a Facebook meme for designing an album cover. To first establish a band-name, individuals were directed to go to Wikipedia.org and select "random article" – the title of which would become the name of the band. Several singles, in a variety of genres, have been released under the Alpine Skiing at the 1952 Winter Olympics moniker, including the full-length We Welcome You to Elevate, a venture into electronica, which includes songs featuring Jinx Titanic.

=== Jinx Titanic and The Ladykillers ===
In 2012, Kamys returned to performing as Jinx Titanic with a new band The Ladykillers in support of the recording "Mister Casanova."

Recorded by engineer Doug Boehm at The Sound Factory in April 2012, "Mister Casanova" is rooted in Rockabilly and incorporates elements of Burlesque, Doo-wop, Lounge music, Latin American Music, Cabaret, Ska, Rhythm and blues, Surf music, and Gospel music.

The Ladykillers, Titanic's supporting band on the recording, included all of the original members of his previous band Super 8 Cum Shot, along with the addition of vocalists Jay Bennett, and Catherine Smitko, bassists Rob Kassinger and William Lovell III, trombonist Charlie Morillas, and drummer Ted Atkatz.

== Discography ==
- I Killed Juanita (2015) as Jinx Titanic and the Ladykillers
- Meat Man (2014) as John Kamys
- Maybe You Don't Love Me Anymore (2013) as Jinx Titanic and Carpacho's Combo
- Mister Casanova (2012) as Jinx Titanic and the Ladykillers
- We Welcome You To Elevate (2010) as Alpine Skiing at the 1952 Winter Olympics
- Found in Trunk (Good and Bad Demos Live Junk & Oddities) (2009) as Jinx Titanic & Super 8 Cum Shot
- 100% Pure Class, The Very Best of Jinx Titanic & Super 8 Cum Shot (2009) as Jinx Titanic & Super 8 Cum Shot
- I Want Some Sun (2009) as John Kamys
- Stuporstardom! (2007) as Jinx Titanic
- Booted & Cuffed (2005) with band JINX TITANIC
- Anal Sunshine (2005) with band JINX TITANIC
- Super 8 Cum Shot Volume II (2003) with band Super 8 Cum Shot
- Super 8 Cum Shot Volume I (2002) with band Super 8 Cum Shot
- Guns (2001) as John Kamys
- Supremacist (1999) as John Kamys

== Music for theater ==
- Bent play by Martin Sherman, Directed by Jacob Christopher Green – Hubris Productions 2009
- Red Noses play by Peter Barnes, Directed by Patricia Savio – Hubris Productions 2009
- Suenos Bebes y Vampiros play by Teatro Vista Collaborative Ensemble, directed by Sandra Marquez – Teatro Vista 2004
- A Christmas Carol book by Charles Dickens, adapted by Tom Creamer, directed by Henry Godinez (1999, 2000, 2001), and Kate Buckley (2002) – Goodman Theater 1999–2002
- The Winter's Tale play by William Shakespeare, Directed by Henry Godinez – Missouri Repertory Theater 2002
- Icarus play by Edwin Sanchez, Directed by Eddie Torres – Teatro Vista 2002
- Future City Homosexual Tells All Play by John Kamys, Directed by Tab Baker – The Theater Building Chicago 1999
- Wrong For Each Other play by Norm Foster, Directed by Gary Griffin – Victory Gardens Theater 1999
- Straight As A Line play by Luis Alfaro, Directed by Henry Godinez – Goodman Theater 1998
- The Boiler Room by Reuben Gonzalez, Directed by Eddie Torred – Steppenwolf Theater/Teatro Vista
- El Paso Blue play by Octavio Solis, Directed by Henry Godinez – Next Theater/Teatro Vista
- Romeo and Juliet Play by William Shakespeare, Directed by Henry Godinez – Colorado Shakespeare Festival 1997
- Santos and Santos Play by Octavio Solis, Directed by Henry Godinez – Teatro Vista 1996
- Cloud Tectonics Play by Jose Rivera, Directed by Henry Godinez – Goodman Theater 1995
- Ambrosio play by Romulus Linney, Directed by Eddie Torres – Teatro Vista 1994

== Filmography ==
- Stirring Water (2008)
- Masterz in Motion (2007)
- Hot Chicks (2006)
- Jean Genet in Chicago (2006)

== Awards and nominations ==
- 2005 Chicago Free Press Pressie Award – Best Chicago Musician
- 2004 OMA – Outstanding Producer Super 8 Cum Shot Volume II
- 2004 OMA Nomination – Outstanding Recording by a Band Super 8 Cum Shot Volume II
- 2003 OMA Nomination – Outstanding Recording by a Duo or a Group Super 8 Cum Shot Volume I
- 2000 GLAMA Nomination – Best New Artist – John Kamys
- 2000 GLAMA Nomination – Out Song Trade
- 1998 Joseph Jefferson Award – Best Original Music El Paso Blue
- 1996 Joseph Jefferson Award Nomination – Best Original Music Cloud Tectonics

== Performances ==
The Empty Bottle, Folsom Street Fair, Gay Games VII – Closing Ceremonies, Knitting Factory, North Halsted Market Days, NXNE, PrideFest (Milwaukee), Pride Week (Toronto), Sundance Film Festival – Queer Lounge, Troma Films – Tromathon, Whisky A Go Go, Willamette Week – MusicFest NW
