= The Year of No Returning =

Studio album by Ezra Furman
- Released: February 2012

Ezra Furman chronology
The Year of No Returning (2012)	Day of the Dog (2013)

The Year of No Returning is a 2012 album by Ezra Furman. Having previously released three albums as Ezra Furman and the Harpoons, this was the first to be released solely under her name. It was released in February 2012.

== Track listing ==
No.	Title	Length
1.	"Dr Jekyll & Mr Hyde"	3:47
2.	"American Soil"	4:34
3.	"Lay in the Sun"	3:54
4.	"Sinking Slow"	4:27
5.	"That's When It Hit Me"	3:25
6.	"Down"	3:55
7.	"Cruel, Cruel World"	3:23
8.	"Are You Gonna Break My Heart?"	2:53
9.	"Bad Man"	4:55
10.	"The Queen of Hearts"	4:57
11.	"Doomed Love Affair"	2:57
12.	"40 Days in Kansas"	4:25
