= Day of the Dog (Ezra Furman album) =

Studio album by Ezra Furman
- Released: 8 October 2013
- Genre: Rock and roll
- Length: 41:17
- Label: Bar/None Records

Ezra Furman chronology
The Year of No Returning (2012)	Day of the Dog (2013)	Perpetual Motion People (2015)

Day of the Dog is the second studio album by Chicago rock musician Ezra Furman. It was released in October 2013 by Bar/None Records. It comes after her début solo album The Year of No Returning which follow three albums with her previous backing band the Harpoons, it was recorded with her new backing band the Boyfriends, who formed in 2012 to tour The Year of No Returning.

Professional ratings
Review scores
Source	Rating
AllMusic	4/5 stars
The Guardian	5/5 stars
The Line of Best Fit	7.5/10 stars

== Track listing ==
All songs written and composed by Ezra Furman, except "The Mall", written and composed by Paul Baribeau

No.	Title	Length
1.	"I Wanna Destroy Myself"	2:30
2.	"Tell 'em All to Go to Hell"	2:13
3.	"My Zero"	3:55
4.	"Day of the Dog"	3:25
5.	"Walk on in Darkness"	3:30
6.	"Cold Hands"	2:40
7.	"Anything Can Happen"	2:26
8.	"And Maybe God is a Train"	2:15
9.	"Been So Strange"	3:26
10.	"The Mall"	2:25
11.	"At the Bottom of the Ocean"	3:23
12.	"Slacker / Adria"	5:10
13.	"Cherry Lane"	4:12
Total length:		41:17
