= Mitch Grainger =

Australian musician, record producer, educator, and inventor

- Born: Mitchell Grainger; February 12, 1974 (age 51); Balmain, New South Wales, Australia
- Genres: Blues; roots; rock
- Occupations: Musician; record producer; educator; inventor
- Instruments: Vocals; guitar; harmonica
- Years active: 1988–present
- Labels: Albert Productions; Flashpoint Music; Festival Records
- Formerly of: The Beefs; Bondi Cigars; Papa Lips; Grainger; The Lovers
- Website: mitchgrainger.com

Mitch Grainger (born 12 February 1974), is an Australian blues and roots rock musician, record producer, educator and inventor who started performing professionally at the age of 13 in Sydney and has since worked with a long list of iconic Australian musicians, such as Harry Vanda of The Easybeats, Malcolm Young of AC/DC and John Brewster of The Angels, as well as Tommy Emmanuel, Alex Lloyd, Kara Grainger, Rick Price, and the Bondi Cigars.

== Australian music career ==
=== The Beefs ===
Mitch Grainger grew up in Balmain, Sydney, in the 70's and 80's and by age 13 was playing the Harmonica and Guitar professionally in local venues, emulating American blues artists Little Walter and Muddy Waters in 'The Beefs', a band he formed with fellow high school students, singer-songwriter Alex Lloyd and Declan Kelly.

Despite all members of the band being under 18 years of age, The Beefs performed in pubs and clubs across Sydney's inner west 5 nights a week for a period of 4 years, before disbanding in 1990 when Alex Lloyd left to form a new group called 'Mother Hubbard'. During this period The Beefs met Malcolm Young of AC/DC who took Mitch Grainger and the band into Albert's studios to record.

=== The Bondi Cigars ===
In 1993 Mitch Grainger (now 19 years old) was hired by the Bondi Cigars to play guitar and harmonica across Australia as a part of their touring show. The Bondi Cigars were on the road for 3 weeks out of every 5 during this period of their career. Mitch Grainger stayed with the band for 2 years in which time he recorded on The Bondi Cigars album "After Closing Time".

=== Papa Lips (Grainger) ===
After leaving The Bondi Cigars Mitch Grainger formed Papa Lips (a six-piece Blues & Roots band) with his sister Kara Grainger, Declan Kelly, Rowan Lane, Danny Guerrero and Clayton Doley. Through Mitch Grainger's connections with Malcolm Young and Albert Productions, the band was introduced to John Brewster of The Angels who managed the band.

Papa Lips recorded and released one EP (Harmony – 1996) and one album (High Time Now – 1998) distributed by Festival Records. They toured extensively on Australia's east coast, and played major Australian music festivals such as the Byron Bay Bluesfest and Woodford. In 1998 Papa Lips were awarded, "Best New Band" at the Australian Blues Music Awards.

In 1998 the band was introduced to producer Harry Vanda of The Easybeats and AC/DC fame and signed by Albert Productions. The band changed their name to "Grainger" and were in the studio for a period of two years recording an unreleased album, and an EP, Sky Is Falling. In September 2001 Mitch Grainger traveled along with his sister Kara Grainger to New York to meet with American record labels, Atlantic Records, Sony BMG, Virgin Records and Elektra Records. The pair arrived in Manhattan on 9 September and were witness to 11 September attacks.

=== Love & Demons ===
In 2004 Mitch Grainger was signed by Harry Vanda's new production company Flashpoint Music and Mitch began work during studio down time on his debut solo album, entitled "Love & Demons". In 2006 the first single "Insane" was released to Australian radio with the full-length album released in Australia the same year. The album was not a commercial success, however Harry Vanda was impressed with Mitch Grainger's production skills and Mitch started working as a recording engineer at Harry Vanda's Flashpoint studios. During this period Mitch Grainger worked as a recording engineer with established Australian acts such as The Wrights, Harry Vanda and John Paul Young.

=== 2UP with Rick Price ===
Also during this period Mitch Grainger was introduced to Australian pop star Rick Price and the two quickly formed a strong working relationship that saw Mitch Grainger perform "Nobody Knows my Name" for the soundtrack of the feature film December Boys, starring Daniel Radcliffe and Jack Thompson. In 2007 Rick Price and Mitch Grainger recorded and album of acoustic duets named 2UP, borrowing from the Australian gambling game Two-up of the same name.

== US music career ==
=== The Lovers ===
In 2011 Mitch Grainger relocated to Los Angeles and started collaborating with his sister Kara Grainger (who had relocated there a few years earlier), and a group of artists and musicians known as The Beachwood Rockers. This group of actors and musicians, all living around the Beachwood Canyon area of Hollywood consisted of people like James Michael Tyler of Friends, musician Lissie, John Hawkes and Rosa Pullman of The Lovers.

Mitch Grainger and Rosa Pullman started making music together very soon after they met in 2011, and by 2012 had formed a band called 'The in From out of Towners' an acoustic duo that performed 2 to 3 nights a week across Los Angeles, and held a weekly residency at The Piano Bar, a well known Hollywood venue, where they met and jammed with a diverse group of musicians including Billy Gibbons and Kamasi Washington who also played there on a regular basis.

In the process of recording their debut album "The in From Out of Towners" took on a rhythm section and changed the band name to The Lovers.

The Lovers self-titled debut was released in 2013 at The Hotel Cafe in Hollywood and has been featured in American national TV shows, such as Nashville, Killer Women (ABC) and Rake (Fox) as well as in the feature film 'Is That a Gun in Your pocket', released September 2016. Despite this success The Lovers broke up in 2015.

=== The Blues ===
After The Lovers broke up (In 2015) Mitch Grainger recorded and released The Blues, a solo acoustic blues album. Growing in confidence as a lead vocalist and stepping out of the sideman role, this was Mitch Grainger's first release as a solo artist in over 9 years and according to some Australian media at the time was "a signpost of artistic and personal growth that brings Mitch out of a recording hiatus and into the spotlight".

After its Australian release the album spent five months in the Australian Blues & Roots Radio Chart, debuting at number 16 before reaching as high as number 6. Its success on Australian blues radio saw Grainger return to tour Australia twice in six months, playing over 40 dates across the east coast of Australia as a part of "The Blues Tour".

=== Showcase Festivals ===
In February 2016 Grainger was officially invited to showcase for the American Folk Alliance National Conference in Kansas City, which was followed by a performance in September 2016 (and again in 2017) at the Live @ Heart Festival in örebro, Sweden. Following this Mitch Grainger was invited to open for Tommy Emmanuel on his 2017 east coast US tour, receiving standing ovations at some shows.

== Harmonica ==
=== YouTube Success ===
Before relocating to America, Mitch Grainger taught Harmonica privately in Sydney for over 20 years. After one of his students recommended Mitch look into posting some videos on YouTube, In March 2012 Mitch Grainger uploaded the first lesson in his Step-by-Step Harmonica Course to YouTube, "Step by Step Harmonica Lessons – Lesson 1".

This first video now has over 3.4 million hits, and along with his other videos has seen his YouTube channel grow to currently receive 2,500 – 3,000 hits a day and have over 76,000 subscribers.

=== Dyna-Mic ===
Between touring for The Blues, Mitch Grainger focused his attention on inventing a harmonica microphone that enables him to perform and record his own form of Blues Rock with a full band, yet without compromising on the sound of the harmonica, in high volume, amplified situations, and in September 2017 Mitch Grainger was awarded a US Patent for his invention "Harmonica Microphone with improved Control of Audio Feedback", known commercially as Dyna-Mic.

Dyna-Mic was successfully launched on Kickstarter in 2018, and first used on stage by Bob Dylan during his 2018 New Zealand stadium tour.

== Select discography ==
Year	Title	Artist	Label	Credits
1995	After Closing Time	The Bondi Cigars	Larrikin/Festival	Guitars, Harmonicas
1996	Harmony (EP)	Papa Lips	LipSync Records, FIDO/Festival	Vocals, Guitars, Harmonicas
1998	High Time Now	Papa Lips	LipSync Records, FIDO/Festival	Vocals, Guitars, Harmonicas
2002	Sky Is Falling	Grainger	Coady Music, MGM Distribution	Vocals, Guitars, Harmonicas
2006	Love and Demons	Mitch Grainger	Flashpoint Music	Vocals, Guitars, Harmonicas, Engineer, Producer.
2007	2 Up	Rick Price & Mitch Grainger	Clarice Records/MGM	Vocals, Guitars, Harmonicas.
2008	Grand and Green River	Kara Grainger	Craving Records	Harmonica.
2011	L.A. Blues	Kara Grainger	NewTrax Records	Harmonica.
2013	The Lovers	The Lovers	GENT	Vocals, Guitars, Harmonicas, Engineer, Producer.
2015	Four String Confessions	Sereetsi & The Natives	In The Loop	Harmonica.
2015	The Blues	Mitch Grainger	GENT	Vocals, Guitars, Harmonicas, Engineer, Producer.
2018	Living with Your Ghost	Kara Grainger	Station House Records	Harmonica.
