= Moonshine Highway =

- Promotional poster
- Written by: Andy Armstrong
- Directed by: Andy Armstrong
- Starring: Kyle MacLachlan; Randy Quaid; Maria del Mar
- Music by: Steve Dorff
- Country of origin: United States
- Original language: English

Production
- Producers: Andy Armstrong; Becky Arntzen; Chris Danton
- Cinematography: Richard Quinlan
- Editor: Patrick McMahon
- Running time: 96 minutes
- Production company: Showtime Networks

Original release
- Network: Showtime
- Release: May 5, 1996

Moonshine Highway is a 1996 American Southern noir crime thriller television film written and directed by Andy Armstrong. It stars Kyle MacLachlan, Randy Quaid, and Maria del Mar. It was broadcast in the United States by Showtime on May 5, 1996.

The film has been described as a recent example in a tradition of popular cultural depictions of moonshiners as "noble renegades" of the backwoods South (also found in 1958's Thunder Road).

== Plot ==
Set in the 1950s, in backcountry Tennessee, the story focuses on Jed Muldoon (Kyle MacLachlan), a World War II veteran who smuggles illegal corn whiskey in his modified Lincoln.

Muldoon is having an affair with Ethel Miller (Maria del Mar), whose husband is the corrupt, local sheriff Wendell Miller (Randy Quaid). Sheriff Miller is under pressure from federal agent Bill Rickman (Alex Carter) to arrest the moonshiners.

== Cast ==
- Kyle MacLachlan as Jed Muldoon
- Randy Quaid as Sheriff Miller
- Maria del Mar as Ethel Miller
- Alex Carter as Bill Rickman
- Gary Farmer as "Hooch" Wilson
- Jeremy Ratchford as Dwayne Dayton
- Les Carlson as Pappy
- Dennis Fitzgerald as Clancy Clayton
- Raliegh Wilson as Claude Clayton
- Michael Copeman as Ol Man Clayton
- Jody Racicot as Haywood Possum
- Rick Roberts as Travis Saunders
- Lori Hallier as Rose
- Eleanor Joy Lind as Lorna, The Waitress
- Dick Callahan as Moody
- Doug Lennox as Parker
- David Cronenberg as Clem Clayton
- Beau Starr as Dale Lister
- Andy Armstrong as Bill Meyers
- Stuart Hughes as Stopwatch Man
- J. Winston Carroll as Ned, The Barman
- Todd William Schroeder as Deputy Clyde
- Mike Lee as Deputy #2
- Jason Deline as Grocery Boy (uncredited)

== Production ==
Moonshine Highway was filmed in Ontario, Canada: in Markham; Mississauga; New Tecumseth; Pickering; Scarborough; Toronto; and Whitchurch-Stouffville.

== Home media ==
It was first released on videotape on August 6, 1996. It later was released on DVD in Argentina in May 2008.

== See also ==
- Moonshine in popular culture
