= Big Fugitive Life =

EP by Ezra Furman
- Released: August 19, 2016
- Length: 17:54
- Label: Bella Union

Ezra Furman chronology
Songs by Others (2016)	Big Fugitive Life (2016)	Transangelic Exodus (2018)

Professional ratings
Aggregate scores
Source	Rating
Metacritic	72/100
Review scores
Source	Rating
AllMusic	3/5 stars
The Line of Best Fit	(7.5/10)

Big Fugitive Life is an EP by Ezra Furman. It was released on 19 August 2016 by Bella Union.

== Track listing ==
No.	Title	Length
1.	"Teddy I'm Ready"	4:19
2.	"Haley's Comet"	2:42
3.	"Little Piece of Trash"	2:01
4.	"Penetrate"	2:24
5.	"Splash of Light"	2:00
6.	"The Refugee"	4:28
