= Moonshine in popular culture =

Moonshine (illicit distillation) is referenced in many works, including books, motion pictures, musical lyrics and television.

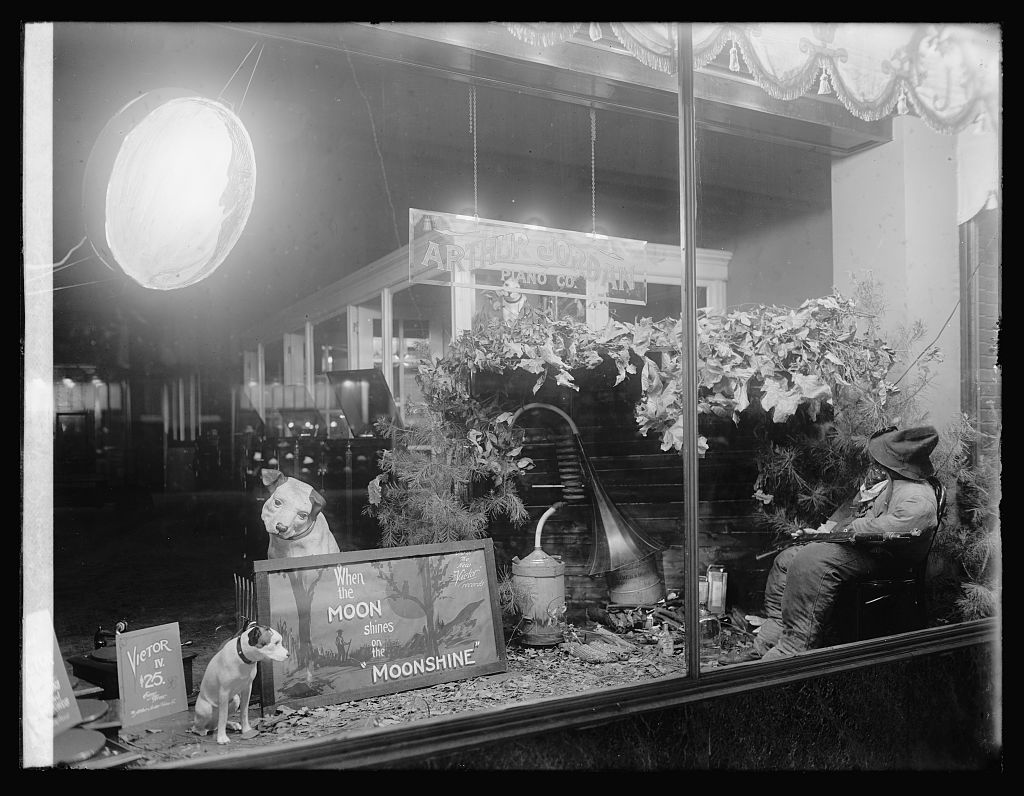
Moonshine window in the Arthur Jordan Piano Company storefront, Washington, D.C., ca. 1920

== Literature ==
- In Patrick Dennis' fictional biography First Lady, the early years revolve around a moonshine called "Lohocla" (alcohol spelled backwards) produced by the father of protagonist Martha Dinwiddie Butterfield. As time passes in the story the concoction is less prominent, until the time of World War II, when the now-aged Martha Dinwiddie Butterfield donates her father's original formula for Lohocla to the United States government, which uses it in the atomic bombs dropped on Japan.
- In Rocket Boys (and the follow-on movie) by Homer H. Hickam Jr., moonshine plays a role in one of the home-made rocket fuels the protagonists create. In order to obtain it, they wind up getting drunk.
- In The Goblin Reservation by Clifford D. Simak, the Neanderthal Alley Oop makes a very strong moonshine which everyone but him finds disgusting.

== Movies ==
- In the 1924 cartoon Felix Finds Out, Felix the Cat is asked by his friend Willie to find out what makes the moon shine which is the latter's homework. As a mistake, Felix goes to a distillery serving moonshine, and drinks a bottle.
- In the 1953 movie Stalag 17, featuring William Holden as prisoner of war Sgt. Sefton, Sefton's still is one of his more "profitable" ventures. Of its product, made from potato peels and a few strings from Red Cross packages, he says the house "only guarantees you won't go blind."
- The 1958 movie Thunder Road starred Robert Mitchum as a moonshine runner who takes risks driving his family's product through the hills of Tennessee for delivery in Memphis.
- The 1961 Soviet short comedy film Moonshiners directed by Leonid Gaidai.
- The 1963 film The Great Escape is about an escape by Allied prisoners of war from a German POW camp during World War II. The two principal characters were U.S. Army Air Force Captain Virgil Hilts "The Cooler King," played by Steve McQueen and British Royal Air Force Flight Lieutenant Bob Hendley DFC "The Scrounger", played by James Garner. The two make moonshine in celebration of the 4th of July. On that day while passing out their potent concoction to the detainees, German guards discover the tunnel—nicknamed "Tom"—being dug by these two and the other prisoners.
- The 1968 film Killers Three. Moonshine runner in NC mountains, post WW2. Dick Clark co-star.
- In the John Wayne films True Grit (1969) and Rooster Cogburn (1975), Wayne's character Ruben J. "Rooster" Cogburn is a heavy-drinking United States Marshal who refers to his favorite moonshine as "genuine, double-rectified busthead". However, he never buys his moonshine, instead confiscating it from other drunks for his own consumption.
- The 1972 Finnish film Eight Deadly Shots features sequences of moonshining.
- Moonshine was central to the plots in the 1973 Burt Reynolds films White Lightning and its sequel Gator.
- The 1973 film The Last American Hero is based on the true story of American NASCAR racing driver and owner Junior Johnson and his family's long involvement in moonshining in North Carolina.
- The 1973 film Walking Tall depicts Sheriff Buford Pusser, who combats, among other things, illegal moonshine distilleries in McNairy County.
- The 1975 film Moonrunners is a fictionalized account of the real-life experiences and stories of moonshiner Jerry Rushing.
- In the 1977 film Greased Lightning stars Richard Pryor as Wendell Scott, the first African-American stock car racing champion in the United States. The film is loosely based on Scott's true life story. As a taxi cab driver in post-World War II, Scott had learned the skill of car racing by transporting illegal moonshine in the backwoods of Virginia.
- The 1970s TV series The Waltons had two recurring characters, the elderly and genteel Baldwin sisters, Southern belle spinsters who follow in their father's footsteps making and sharing a product they describe as "Papa's recipe" or "The Recipe" which they naively believe to be a harmless folk remedy; in fact it is powerful moonshine whiskey.
- The 1996 film The People vs. Larry Flynt depicts Flynt and his brother Jimmy selling moonshine as children.
- In the 1996 made-for-TV-movie Moonshine Highway, Kyle MacLachlan stars as a driver who smuggles illegal moonshine through backcountry Tennessee in his modified Lincoln. Set in the 1950s, the moonshiners contest with federal agents, and a corrupt sheriff.
- The 2002 Hungarian film Hukkle (Hiccups) is a study of a rural community where the regular distribution of moonshine is suddenly responsible for a series of mystery deaths when the rebellious women of the town kill the more chauvinist men with select bottles tinctured with lily of the valley root.
- In the 2009 film Inglourious Basterds, Lt. Aldo Raine (played by Brad Pitt) says "Maynardville, Tennessee. I done my share of bootleggin'. Up there, if you engage in what the federal government calls illegal activity, but what we call a man just trying to earn a living for his family selling moonshine liquor, it behooves oneself to keep his wits. Long story short, we hear a story too good to be true—it is.
- The 2012 film, Lawless is a biographical drama gangster film directed by John Hillcoat based on Matt Bondurant's 2008 novel The Wettest County in the World about his grandfather and great-uncles in Prohibition-era Franklin County, Virginia.

== Music ==
- Moonshine appears in a number of artists' songs, like Bruno Mars sang moonshine, Bob Dylan, James Taylor, Van Morrison, John Denver, Ol' Dirty Bastard, Steve Earle, Jimmy Buffett, Akon, Jamie T, Mike Oldfield and Hank Williams, Jr. as well as Hank Williams III. Dolly Parton sang a song called "Daddy's Moonshine Still". American country-roots singer/songwriter Gillian Welch released a moonshiner's dying lament, "Tear My Stillhouse Down". Hank Williams III sang "A Moonshiner's Life", paying homage to one man by name.
- George Jones' 1959 chart-topping song "White Lightning" tells the story of a North Carolina moonshiner. "Well in North Carolina, way back in the hills, lived my ol' pappy and he had him a still. He brewed white lightning 'til the sun went down. Then, he'd fill him a jug and he'd pass it around. Mighty mighty pleasin', pappy's corn squeezin'."
- Robert Mitchum recorded a song in 1958 titled "The Ballad of Thunder Road," in which a moonshiner and his son run the stuff in a truck and the "revenuers" never catch him. At the end the son goes too fast—"He left the road at ninety," says one line. The last line of the chorus goes, "The Law they never got him 'cause the Devil got him first!"
- "Copper Kettle" is a witty song about moonshine performed by artists such as Joan Baez and Bob Dylan.
- The Grateful Dead song "Brown Eyed Women (and Red Grenadine)" contains moonshine references: "Daddy made whiskey and he made it well / Cost two dollars and it burned like hell / I cut hick'ry to fire the still / Drink down a bottle and you're ready to kill".
- Funk band Parliament, led by George Clinton, recorded a song called "Moonshine Heather (Taking Care of Business)", about a mother who must sell moonshine to support her kids.
- Black metal band Venom praise the beverage in a song by the same name, found in their album Possessed.
- Covington, Georgia rapper Boondox recorded a song titled "Sippin on down", about making and consuming moonshine.
- Hoyt Axton's "No No Song" describes progressive attempts to sell drugs and Tennessean moonshine to a recovered addict who refuses it all. Ringo Starr's cover of this song was a number-one hit in Canada.
- The bluegrass song "Rocky Top" (Univ. of Tennessee's fight song) speaks of strangers who went looking for a moonshine still and never returned, as well as locals who "get their corn from a jar" because the ground is too rocky to actually grow corn.
- In the song "Ready or Not" sung by The Fugees, there is a reference to drinking moonshine.
- The Beach Boys' drummer Dennis Wilson recorded a song titled "Moonshine" on his only solo album, Pacific Ocean Blue.
- In the song "Clear Blue Flame" on the album of the same title, Delta Moon stated that "good moonshine burns with a clear, blue flame".
- In the song "Rag Doll", Aerosmith talks about "getting crazy on the moonshine".
- Florida Georgia Line has a song on their album Here's to the Good Times entitled "Get Your Shine On."
- Jake Owen has a song on his album Barefoot Blue Jean Night entitled "Apple Pie Moonshine."
- Rapper Yelawolf is known to reference moonshine, an homage to his Alabama heritage. He considers himself a connoisseur of Southern alcohol, including moonshine.
- Record producer and singer Timbaland said in the Bubba Sparxxx song Deliverance "I've been travelling for some time, with my fishing pole and a bottle of 'shine..."
- Country singer, Brad Paisley's tenth album, released in 2014, is called Moonshine in the Trunk, and includes a song with the same title.
- The Irish folk songs The Moonshiner and The Hills of Connemara both concern moonshine. It is referred to as "mountain tay" in 'Hills'.

== Television ==
- Granny from the 1960s television series The Beverly Hillbillies runs a moonshine still by the Clampett family swimming pool (also referred to as the "cement pond") and refers to the product as rheumatism medicine and as an ingredient in her "spring tonic" and claims to drink only a thimbleful at a time.
- The Waltons featured the elderly spinster Baldwin sisters, who, in memory of their dear departed father, keep alive the knowledge of "The Recipe." Unbeknownst to them, their father was a bootlegger, and the concoction they lovingly produce from "The Recipe" is in fact moonshine whiskey.
- In the television series M*A*S*H, the characters Hawkeye Pierce and Trapper John McIntyre, later replaced by B. J. Hunnicutt, made moonshine (which they usually referred to as gin) in a makeshift distillery in their tent.
- The protagonists of the series The Dukes of Hazzard are depicted as having run a still either presently or in the past, depending upon the adaptation.
- In the Sanford episode "In the Still of the Night", Calvin (Dennis Burkley) sets up a still in Fred Sanford's kitchen.
- A fourth-season episode of Emergency! included a major plot thread about a minor epidemic of psychotic behavior in alcoholics, which was ultimately traced to lead poisoning from a moonshine still. By the end of the episode, Engine Co. 51 was putting out a fire that destroyed that very distillery (and the house where it was located).
- In CSI: Crime Scene Investigation, cases involve suspects and perpetrators possessing moonshine.
- In the second season of The Unit it showed a former member of The Unit brewing Moonshine for other members. It was then showed in a number of episodes the Unit members drinking Moonshine from mason jars.
- In an episode of It's Always Sunny in Philadelphia Frank Reynolds is shown pouring large amounts of moonshine in a secret micro-brew he and Mac were making.
- Early Cuyler of Squidbillies is said to be a frequent brewer of moonshine.
- In the eight episode of Stargate Atlantis's first season, the Atlantis crew meets a civilization that makes their own moonshine.
- In 'The Simpsons, Homer befriends moonshiners, and due to a cultivated taste for alcohol developed from frequent drinking, he becomes an official taste tester.
- In an episode of Oz, the HBO drama series based in a jail, Beecher is given moonshine by a fellow bunkmate.
- A reality television show titled Moonshiners began airing on the Discovery Channel in the fall of 2011.
- In several episodes of The Real Housewives of Orange County Tamra Judge's brother and mother are shown drinking moonshine.
- In the reality show Frontier House, Gordan Clune manufactures and sells moonshine.
- In MythBusters, the MythBusters find out if an exploding still really could blow a house down and if it really could use hooch to fuel an unmodified car on a "moonshine run".
- In Pablo Escobar, The Drug Lord, there are various scenes where Moonshine is consumed by characters.

== Video games ==
- In the game Redneck Rampage, moonshine was used as a power-up that increased fighting ability.
- In Grand Theft Auto: Vice City and Grand Theft Auto: Vice City Stories, a fictional booze called Boomshine is similar to moonshine.
- In Grand Theft Auto V, Franklin, Michael, and Lester celebrate the success of the mission "The Bureau Raid" by toasting with moonshine that Lester had near his desk.
- In BioShock, alcohol entitled "Moonshine" can be found in various locations and may be ingested to increase one's health status at the expense of lowering a player's Eve.
- In Red Dead Redemption, moonshine can be bought and consumed to refill the player's Dead eye meter.
- In Red Dead Redemption 2, moonshine can be bought and consumed to fortify the player's Health core. In the video game's multiplayer component, players are able to produce, manage and distribute moonshine. In order to produce moonshine, the player must purchase mash and allow the distilling process to complete before they are required to sell the goods to buyers. Non-playable Revenue Agents act as an enemy deterrence to challenge the player as they attempt to sell.
- In Alan Wake, the protagonist has an out-of-body experience after drinking moonshine.
- In the two most recent games in the Fallout series, moonshine is a consumable item that raises strength and charisma but lowers intelligence. In the Fallout 3 downloadable content "Point Lookout," the drink is brewed as part of an optional quest. It is the strongest alcohol present in the game. In Fallout: New Vegas, it can be crafted by the player with the assistance of the companion character Rose of Sharon Cassidy. Fallout 4 features "Bobrov's Best Moonshine" famous throughout Massachusetts. Fallout 76 has a public event called "Moonshine Jamboree" in which players must protect various stills from waves of enemies for a moonshining robot.
- In the game This War of Mine—a war survival game inspired by the Siege of Sarajevo—moonshine is an alcohol produced from sugar and clean water. In order to produce moonshine, the player first needs to build a Moonshine still and add a piece of fuel to the sugar and clean water. The product can be traded, drank to calm depression or used as the basis to prepare pure alcohol which has a higher trading value.
- In the game Moonshine Inc. - recreate the life of an American moonshiner from production to distribution as authentically as possible in this tycoon & simulation game. Fermentation and distillation are simulated using exact formulas to produce complex alcohols using accurate apparatuses and production methods.

== Bibliography ==
- Harkins, Anthony. Hillbilly: A Cultural History of an American Icon. Oxford University Press, US, 2005, ISBN 978-0195189506
