= Manda Mosher =

American singer-songwriter

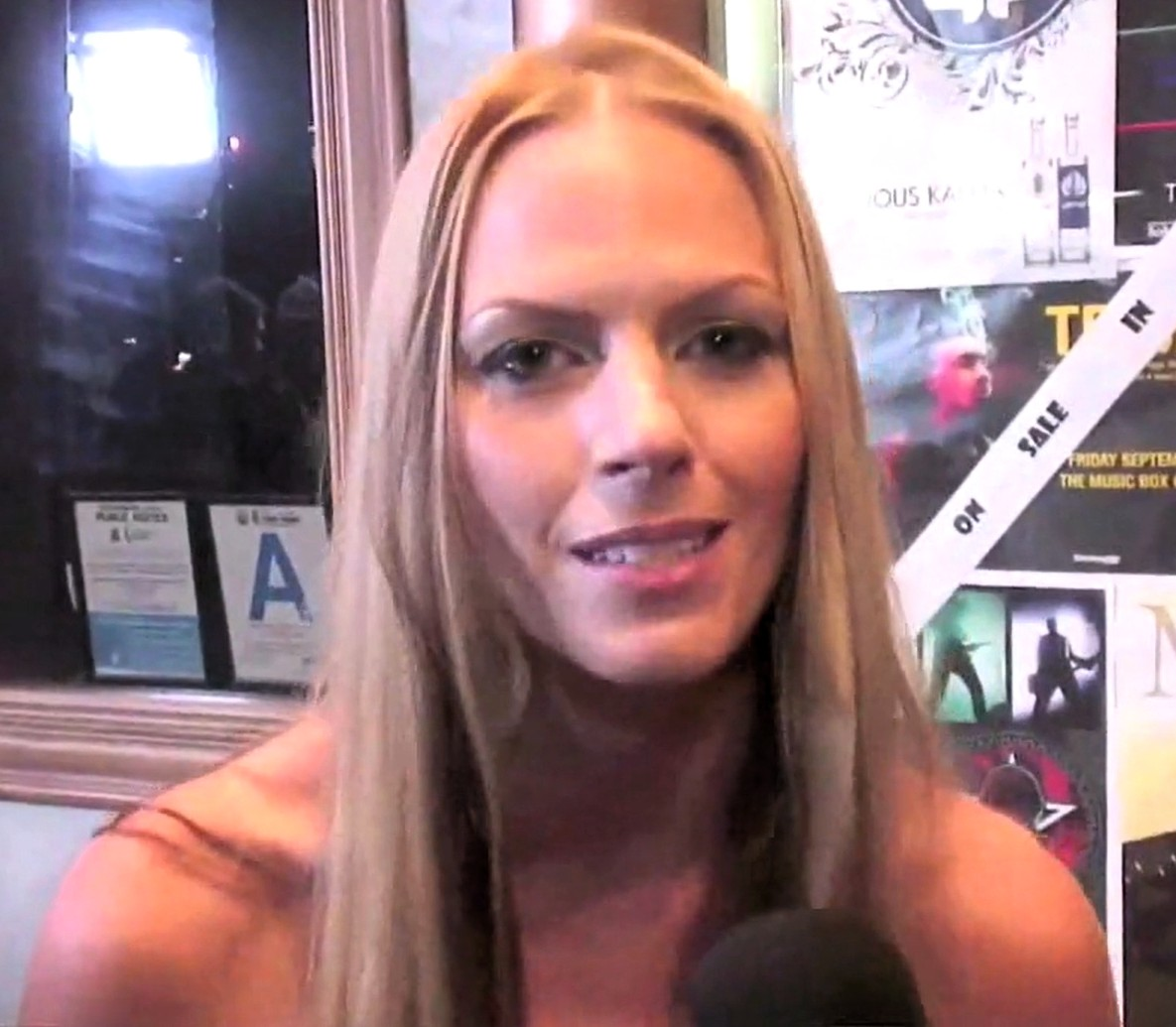
- Mosher in 2009

Background information
- Born: La Crescenta, CA
- Genres: Americana, rock, country
- Occupation: Singer-songwriter
- Instruments: Vocals, guitar, harmonica
- Years active: 1993–present
- Labels: Red Parlor Records; Lakeshore Records; California Country Records
- Website: mandamosher.com

Manda Mosher is an American singer-songwriter and guitarist, and a founding member and co-leader of the Americana country group CALICO the band.

== Early life and education ==
Mosher was born and raised in La Crescenta, California. She grew up in a musical family and, starting at 15, was the lead singer for several local rock bands. She graduated from the Berklee College of Music in 1997 with a bachelor's degree in songwriting. After graduating, she worked for a time at Zomba Music and The Recording Academy.

== Career ==
=== Solo ===
Mosher's debut album Everything You Need was released in 2009 on Red Parlor Records. It was made up entirely of originals that she wrote or co-wrote, other than a cover of "Blue, Red, and Grey" by Pete Townshend. In 2010, she released her follow-up, the five-song EP City of Clowns, on Red Parlor Records. It includes a cover of Bruce Springsteen's "State Trooper". The EP was recorded in Bronxville, New York, and Encino, California.

Mosher performed "Lay Me Down" on The Late Late Show with Craig Ferguson in 2009. Her song "Walk On", which she co-wrote, was featured on the soundtrack to the 2014 film Walk of Shame, starring Elizabeth Banks. She has won several Los Angeles Music Awards, including the 2005 Female Singer/Songwriter of the Year, 2006 Rock Single of the Year for her song “Mr. Madness”, and 2010 National Touring Artist of the Year.

=== Calico the Band ===
In 2012, Mosher and fellow Los Angeles-based singer-songwriters Kristen Proffit and Jaime Wyatt formed CALICO the band, a California country Americana group, influenced by artists like Gram Parsons and Emmylou Harris, and inspired by 1960s and 1970s Laurel Canyon country-rock music. In April 2014, Wyatt was replaced by Aubrey Richmond, who joined the band on vocals, violin and mandolin, with CALICO featuring the three-part harmonies of Mosher, Proffit and Richmond. The band's first album, Rancho California, was released on September 2, 2014, on their label California Country Records, which Mosher co-founded. It features original compositions, along with a cover of Bob Dylan's "You Ain't Goin' Nowhere", and production by Rami Jaffee of the Foo Fighters. American Songwriter called the album "music of great passion and beauty, cloaked in warm acoustics and close harmonies." It won Americana Album of the Year at the 2014 Los Angeles Music Awards. Now a duo of Mosher and Proffit, their follow-up, Under Blue Skies, was released in 2017, with songs by Mosher and Proffit, plus covers of John Phillips' "California Dreamin'" and Joni Mitchell's "Ladies of the Canyon". No Depression called the album "one of the ten best Americana albums of 2017."

The band performed at the 2014 Stagecoach Festival in Indio, California, and has toured the United States, United Kingdom, and Europe.

== Discography ==
=== Albums ===
Year	Artist	Title
2009	Manda Mosher	Everything You Need: Released: April 7, 2009; Label: Red Parlor Records; Formats: CD, digital download
2014	CALICO the band	Rancho California: Released: September 2, 2014; Label: California Country Records; Formats: CD, LP, digital download
2017	CALICO the band	Under Blue Skies: Released: September 15, 2017; Label: California Country Records; Formats: CD, LP, cassette, digital download

=== Extended plays ===
Year	Artist	Title
2010	Manda Mosher	City of Clowns: Released: July 12, 2010; Label: Red Parlor Records; Formats: CD, digital download

=== Singles ===
Year	Song	Artist	Album
2011	"You Belong With Me"	Manda Mosher	
2014	"Walk On"	Manda Mosher and Kirsten Proffit	Walk of Shame OST

=== Film/TV soundtrack appearances ===
Year	Song	Artist	Film/TV show	Notes
1999	"Climb"	Manda Mosher	Living Positive	PBS
2009	"You Belong With Me"	Manda Mosher	Venice: The Series	YouTube series
2014	"Walk On"	Manda Mosher and Kirsten Proffit	Walk of Shame OST	Lakeshore Entertainment
2014	"Never Really Gone"	CALICO the band	The Night Shift	NBC
2016	"Never Really Gone"	CALICO the band	Calico Skies	Hot Tub Films
2017	"Santa Have Mercy"	CALICO the band	The Ranch	Netflix
2017	"Wayfaring Stranger"	CALICO the band	The Ranch	Netflix
2017	"Cold, Cold Love"	Manda Mosher	NCIS: Los Angeles	CBS
2018	"Cold, Cold Love"	Manda Mosher	Please Stand By	Magnolia Pictures
