= Cristina Vane =

Country blues musician

Background information
- Born: Turin, Italy
- Genre: Country blues
- Occupations: Singer, guitarist, banjoist, songwriter
- Instruments: Guitar, banjo, vocals
- Years active: 2010s–present
- Website: Official website

Cristina Vane is a country blues singer, guitarist, banjoist and songwriter. She has been influenced by Skip James, Robert Johnson, Blind Willie Johnson, Alanis Morissette and Rory Block. Vane has released two albums, released by Red Parlor Records. Vane noted "I write and perform original music inspired by old-time blues, country, and folk music".

== Life and career ==
She was born in Turin, Italy, to a Sicilian-American father and a Guatemalan mother. She grew up in Europe, moving between Walton-on-Thames in England, then France and Italy, before relocating to the United States for her university education when aged 18. Over this time span her introduction to music started with piano and the recorder in first grade, before moving on to the flute in middle school. She also sang in school choirs, and took voice and guitar lessons for around two years. By high school, Vane started writing songs for fun. She first encountered slide guitar when performing at a weekly gig in Camden, London, when on her summer's break from university. She also played at the Half Moon, Putney, London. She graduated from Princeton University with a degree in Comparative Literature, then moved to Los Angeles where she worked at McCabe's Guitar Shop. Those latter years steered her into a deeper examination of fingerstyle guitar playing and country blues, which led towards old-time music and bluegrass, adding her own clawhammer banjo playing to more regular guitar work. During her time in Southern California, Vane drew songwriting inspiration from musicians including Skip James, Robert Johnson and Blind Willie Johnson.

In 2018, Vane relocated to Nashville, Tennessee. A year earlier, Vane had acquired a customised National Reso-phonic guitar. Late that year, she auditioned for the 17th season of American Idol, advancing through the competition before been eliminated in the Hollywood rounds. She appeared in 2020 at the SVN West when opening for Bob Weir, Wynonna Judd and Cass McCombs. By this time, Vane had traveled across the United States, performing and staying where she could and absorbing the varied cultures and musical trends. The resultant album drawing on these experiences was Nowhere Sounds Lovely, recorded with Wynonna Judd's husband, Cactus Moser, and their band, being a mainly acoustic country blues affair. Nowhere Sounds Lovely, earned her plaudits from American Songwriter, Nashville Scene, Acoustic Guitar, Premier Guitar and Rolling Stone Country, the latter of which deemed the collection, "mesmerizing stuff". It was released on April 2, 2021. Vane stated "When it came to the album, I wanted it to be a reflection of who I am, not just of the old music that I’ve come to love", she explains, "and I'm essentially a rock kid who is obsessed with old music". The album's cover was a picture of Vane holding her customised National Reso-phonic guitar.

Her sophomore album, Make Myself Me Again, was released on May 20, 2022, on Red Parlor Records. Vane commented "I've been trying to peel back the layers, to understand who I am, and I think that process has translated to this record", she explained, "The production is straightforward, more minimal, and a bit of a return to my rock roots but still paying homage to the music I've explored since then". The music moved away from the Americana stylings of the debut record, with Delta blues and blues rock influences more to the fore. However, there are elements of Appalachian music slide guitar playing, old-time music influences with double banjos and fiddle solos. She supported the album's release with a lengthy tour of the U.S., followed by a European tour.

== Discography ==
=== Albums ===
| Year | Title | Record label |
|---|---|---|
| 2020 | The Magnolia Sessions | Anti-Corp |
| 2021 | Nowhere Sounds Lovely | Red Parlor Records |
| 2022 | Make Myself Me Again | Red Parlor Records |
| 2025 | Hear My Call | Blue Tip Records |
