= David Olney =

American folk singer-songwriter (1948–2020)

- Birth name: David Charles Olney
- Born: March 23, 1948; Providence, Rhode Island, U.S.
- Died: January 18, 2020 (aged 71); Santa Rosa Beach, Florida, U.S.
- Genres: Folk
- Instrument: Guitar
- Years active: 1971–2020
- Labels: Philo; Rounder; Strictly Music; Deadbeet
- Website: davidolney.com

David Charles Olney (March 23, 1948 – January 18, 2020) was an American folk singer-songwriter. Olney recorded more than twenty albums over his five-decade career. His songs have been covered by numerous artists, including Emmylou Harris, Del McCoury, Linda Ronstadt and Steve Earle.

== Career ==
Olney was born on March 23, 1948, in Providence, Rhode Island. After briefly attending the University of North Carolina at Chapel Hill, he joined Bland Simpson's band Simpson. They recorded one album in New York in 1971. The next year he relocated to Atlanta and in 1973 moved to Nashville with the hope of selling his material to record labels.

In the early 1980s, he formed the band The X-Rays, which recorded two albums for Rounder Records. The group appeared on Austin City Limits, opened for major acts, including Elvis Costello, and broke up in 1985.

Over the following decades, Olney performed as a solo singer-songwriter, releasing more than 20 albums including six live recordings. He collaborated with artists such as John Hadley and Sergio Webb. His songs were covered by and co-written with Emmylou Harris, Steve Earle, Linda Ronstadt, Steve Young, Del McCoury, and Laurie Lewis, among many others.

Olney was a key member of Nashville's music community. The Rhode Island native was a compelling and enigmatic presence in Music City. He wrote sonnets and starred at the Nashville Shakespeare Festival, and his live concerts blended tenderness and ferocity, theatre and sincerity, agitation and embrace.

== Personal life and death ==
Olney resided in Nashville, Tennessee, with his wife Regine, with whom he had a son, Redding, and a daughter, Lillian. Olney formed a mutual admiration with Townes Van Zandt when he began his solo career. Van Zandt bought Olney a sport coat from a Goodwill store in Little Rock, and famously stated that "Dave Olney is one of the best songwriters I've ever heard, alongside Wolfgang Amadeus Mozart, Lightnin' Hopkins, and Bob Dylan."

Olney died of an apparent heart attack during a performance onstage at the 30A Songwriter Festival in Santa Rosa Beach, Florida, on January 18, 2020, at the age of seventy-one. He was in the middle of his third song when he stopped, apologized and shut his eyes, according to fellow musician Scott Miller, who was accompanying Olney.

== Discography ==
=== Solo albums ===
- 1986: Eye of the Storm (Philo / Rounder)
- 1989: Deeper Well (Philo)
- 1991: Roses (Philo)
- 1991: Top to Bottom (Appaloosa)
- 1992: Border Crossing (SilenZ Records)
- 1994: Ache of Longing (Roadsongs)
- 1995: High, Wide and Lonesome (Philo / Rounder)
- 1997: Real Lies (Philo)
- 1999: Through a Glass Darkly (Philo / Rounder)
- 2000: Omar's Blues (Dead Reckoning)
- 2003: The Wheel (Loud House)
- 2005: Migration (Loud House)
- 2007: One Tough Town (Red Parlor)
- 2007: Illegal Cargo (South Central Music)
- 2009: Ol' Diz: A Musical Baseball Story. A Songwriters' Work in Progress (Deadbeet) with John Hadley
- 2010: Dutchman's Curve (Deadbeet/Continental Song City)
- 2014: When the Deal Goes Down (Deadbeet)
- 2017: Don't Try to Fight It (Red Parlor)
- 2018: This Side or the Other (Black Hen Music)

==== Live albums ====
- 1994: Live in Holland (StrictlyCountryRecords.com)
- 1999: Ghosts in the Wind: Live at La Casa, Michigan (Barbed)
- 2002: Women Across the River: Live in Holland (StrictlyCountryRecords.com)
- 2004: Illegal Cargo: Live in Holland (StrictlyCountryRecords.com)
- 2006: Lenora: Live in Holland (StrictlyCountryRecords.com) with: Thomm Jutz & Sergio Webb
- 2008: Live at Norm's River Roadhouse, Volume 1 (Deadbeat) with: Sergio Webb and Jack Irwin
- 2014: Sweet Poison (StrictlyCountryRecords.com) with: Sergio Webb
- 2016: Holiday in Holland DVD + CD (StrictlyCountryRecords.com) with Sergio Webb
- 2022: Evermore (StrictlyCountryRecords.com) with Daniel Seymour
- 2022: Nevermore (StrictlyCountryRecords.com) with Daniel Seymour

==== Compilations ====
- 2012: Body of Evidence (Deadbeet) collects the EPs Film Noir, The Stone, and Robbery & Murder as a 3-CD box set
- 2013: Predicting The Past: Introducing Americana Music Vol.2 (Rootsy) [Two discs. Disc 2: retrospective 2000–2012, all previously released]

=== EPs ===
- 2011: Film Noir (Deadbeet)
- 2012: The Stone (Deadbeet)
- 2012: Robbery & Murder (Deadbeet)

=== With Anana Kaye ===
- 2021: Whispers and Sighs (Schoolkids Records)

=== With Bland Simpson ===
- 1971: Simpson

=== With the X-rays ===
- 1981: Contender (Rounder)
- 1984: Customized (Boulevard)

=== With Nashville Jug Band ===
- 1982: Nashville Jug Band (Rounder)

=== Singles ===
- 2014: "When the Deal Comes Down"

=== As composer ===
- 1985: Mike Cross – Solo at Midnight (Sugar Hill) – track 5, "Georgia May"
- 1985: Mimi Fariña – Solo (Philo) – track 5, "If My Eyes Were Blind"
- 1986: Steve Young – Look Homeward Angel (Mill) – track 3, "If My Eyes Were Blind"
- 1993: Emmylou Harris – Cowgirl's Prayer (Warner Bros.) – track 8, "Jerusalem Tomorrow"
- 1995: Emmylou Harris – Wrecking Ball (Elektra / Asylum) – track 6, "Deeper Well" (co-written with Daniel Lanois and Emmylou Harris)
- 1995: Linda Ronstadt – Feels Like Home (Elektra) – track 9, "Women Cross the River"
- 1996: Garnet Rogers – Night Drive (Snow Goose) – track 6, "Love's Been Linked To The Blues"
- 1999: Linda Ronstadt and Emmylou Harris – Western Wall: The Tucson Sessions (Asylum) – track 5, "1917"
- 2006: Kieran Kane, Kevin Welch, and Fats Kaplin – Lost John Dean (Compass) – track 5, "Postcard From Mexico" (co-written with John Hadley); track 8, "Mr Bones" (co-written with Claudia Scott, John Hadley, and Kevin Welch)
- 2006: Slaid Cleaves – Unsung (Rounder) – track 7, "Millionaire"
- 2007: Mae Robertson – Dream (Lyric Partners) – track 14, "Dream a Dream" (co-written with Carol Elliott)
- 2008: Eric Brace and Peter Cooper – You Don't Have to Like Them Both (Red Beet / CoraZong) – track 2, "Omar's Blues #2"
- 2008: Tim O'Brien – Chameleon (Howdy Skies) – track 3, "The Garden"; track 7, "Chameleon"; track 12, "When In Rome" (all co-written with John Hadley and Tim O'Brien)
- 2009: Del McCoury – By Request (McCoury Music) – track 11, "Queen Anne's Lace"
- 2009: Pascal Briggs – The Mercenary (Drumming Monkey) – track 3, "Millionaire"
- 2009: Kieran Kane – Somewhere Beyond the Roses (Compass / Dead Reckoning) – track 8, "I Took My Power Back" (co-written with Kieran Kane)
- 2009: The Wailin' Jennys – Live at the Mauch Opera House (Red House) – track 1, "Deeper Well" (co-written with Daniel Lanois and Emmylou Harris)
- 2011: Annika Fehling – Fireflies (Rootsy) – track 12, "I Know Better" (co-written with Annika Fehling)
- 2012: Rocky Hill – Lone Star Legend (Floating World) – track 1, "Take A Message To Garcia"; track 2, "Go Down Dupree"; track 7, "Charleston Knife"
- 2014: Rory McNamara – The Ring Of Truth Trio – Dangerous Business (Rolltop Discs) – track 4, "Walk Downtown"

=== As guest musician ===
- 2015: Tom Russell – The Rose of Roscrae (Proper)
