= Doug Boehm =

American record producer

- Birth name: Douglas H. Boehm
- Born: November 4, 1969 (age 55)
- Origin: South Pasadena, California
- Genres: Rock, Alternative rock
- Occupation(s): Producer, Audio engineering

Doug Boehm (born November 4, 1969) is an American record producer and sound engineer who specializes predominantly in the rock music genre and has worked in collaboration with Rob Schnapf on a number of occasions. He produced the releases of the American group French Kicks and served as the recording engineer for Dr. Dog, the Australian groups Powderfinger and The Vines, as well as the British rock group Switches and Las Vegas Alt. Rock band 12 Volt Sex. He recorded the Booker T. Jones album Potato Hole with the Drive-By Truckers, the Jinx Titanic and The Ladykillers album Mister Casanova, and produced Ezra Furman's album Mysterious Power and the San Francisco band Girls' highly acclaimed second album Father, Son, Holy Ghost.

Doug Boehm lives in South Pasadena, California with his wife and two children.
