= Mysterious Power =

Studio album by Ezra Furman and the Harpoons
- Released: April 5, 2011
- Recorded: 2010–2011
- Genres: Indie rock, Folk rock
- Length: 41:35
- Label: Red Parlor Records
- Producer: Doug Boehm

Ezra Furman and the Harpoons chronology
| Inside the Human Body (2008) | Mysterious Power (2011) |

Mysterious Power is the third studio album by Ezra Furman and the Harpoons. It was released on April 5, 2011 as the follow-up to 2008's Inside the Human Body. It was the band's last album; Ezra Furman has since gone on to record music under her own name with backing band The Boyfriends.

The album has been met with critical acclaim, with the Chicago Sun Times calling it "a joyous racket, a splintered confessional, an anxious thrill ride with the top down next to a fidgety poet who's crazy in love." After appearing at South by Southwest in March, the band launched a U.S. headlining tour in support of the album.

== Track listing ==
1. "Wild Rosemarie" – 4:02
2. "I Killed Myself But I Didn't Die" – 4:15
3. "Hard Time In A Terrible Land" – 2:27
4. "Mysterious Power" – 3:09
5. "Teenage Wasteland" – 2:09
6. "Bloodsucking Whore" – 4:22
7. "Don't Turn Your Back On Love" – 5:49
8. "Portrait Of Maude" – 2:46
9. "Fall In Love With My World" – 2:43
10. "Too Strung Out" – 1:52
11. "Heaven At The Drive-In" – 3:48
12. "Wild Feeling" – 4:21

Professional ratings
Review scores
| Source | Rating |
|---|---|
| Chicago Sun Times | 4/5 stars |
| Consequence of Sound | 4.5/5 stars |
| Paste Magazine | (8.2/10) |
