= Twelve Nudes =

Studio album by Ezra Furman
- Released: August 30, 2019
- Studio: Coyote Hearing Studio, Oakland, California
- Length: 27:33
- Label: Bella Union

Ezra Furman chronology
Transangelic Exodus (2018)	Twelve Nudes (2019)	All of Us Flames (2022)

Twelve Nudes is the fifth solo studio album by Ezra Furman. It was released on August 30, 2019, through Bella Union.

== Development ==
The album takes its name from a series of meditations by Anne Carson "on the intense pain we deal with in life". Furman was inspired to create Twelve Nudes by her anger at the perceived injustices of the Trump administration and late capitalism, as well as her Jewish and transgender identities.

== Critical reception ==
Professional ratings
Aggregate scores
Source	Rating
Metacritic	80/100
Review scores
Source	Rating
AllMusic	4/5 stars
Consequence of Sound	B−
Under the Radar	8.5/10 stars

According to Metacritic, Twelve Nudes has a score of 80 out of 100, indicating that it has received "generally favorable" reviews from critics.

== Track listing ==
Twelve Nudes track listing
No.	Title	Length
1.	"Calm Down aka I Should Not Be Alone"	2:22
2.	"Evening Prayer aka Justice"	2:55
3.	"Transition from Nowhere to Nowhere"	3:11
4.	"Rated R Crusaders"	2:16
5.	"Trauma"	3:07
6.	"Thermometer"	2:05
7.	"I Wanna Be Your Girlfriend"	3:29
8.	"Blown"	0:55
9.	"My Teeth Hurt"	2:31
10.	"In America"	2:10
11.	"What Can You Do But Rock 'n' Roll"	2:32

== Charts ==
Chart performance for Twelve Nudes
Chart (2019)	Peak position
UK Albums (OCC)	95
US Heatseekers Albums (Billboard)	21
US Independent Albums (Billboard)	49
