= All of Us Flames =

Studio album by Ezra Furman
- Released: August 26, 2022
- Studios: Sargent, Los Angeles, CA
- Length: 47:30
- Label: Anti-
- Producer: John Congleton

Ezra Furman chronology
Twelve Nudes (2019)	All of Us Flames (2022)	Goodbye Small Head (2025)

All of Us Flames is the sixth solo studio album by Ezra Furman. It was released on August 26, 2022, through ANTI- Records.

== Critical reception ==
Professional ratings
Aggregate scores
Source	Rating
Metacritic	80/100
Review scores
Source	Rating
AllMusic	4/5 stars
Clash Music	9/10 stars
Under the Radar	8.5/10 stars

According to Metacritic, All of Us Flames has a score of 80 out of 100, indicating that it has received "generally favorable" reviews from critics.

== Track listing ==
All of Us Flames track listing
No.	Title	Length
1.	"Train Comes Through"	4:31
2.	"Throne"	2:29
3.	"Dressed in Black"	3:29
4.	"Forever in Sunset"	4:22
5.	"Book of Our Names"	3:31
6.	"Point Me Toward the Real"	4:55
7.	"Lilac and Black"	4:20
8.	"Ally Sheedy in the Breakfast Club"	3:11
9.	"Poor Girl a Long Way from Heaven"	3:41
10.	"Temple of Broken Dreams"	4:43
11.	"I Saw the Truth Undressing"	4:28
12.	"Come Close"	3:45

== Charts ==
Chart performance for All of Us Flames
Chart (2022)	Peak position
UK Albums (Official Charts)	79
