= Songs by Others =

EP by Ezra Furman
- Released: April 16, 2016
- Recorded: 2015
- Genre: Alternative rock
- Length: 20:41
- Label: Bella Union
- Producer: Tim Sandusky

Ezra Furman chronology
Perpetual Motion People (2015)	Songs by Others (2016)	Big Fugitive Life (2016)

Songs by Others is a Record Store Day exclusive extended play of covers performed by the Chicago artist Ezra Furman and her backing band The Boy-Friends. The release featured a 12-inch LP on clear heavyweight vinyl and a digital download sticker on the sleeve. Most of the tracks on the extended play were recorded at Studio Ballistico in Chicago. Other locations include Furman's own bedroom and two live radio performances.

== Track listing ==
No.	Title	Writer(s)	Original artist	Length
1.	"Devils Haircut"	Beck Hansen, John King, Michael Simpson	Beck	3:13
2.	"Good Book"	Melanie Safka	Melanie	2:34
3.	"Ready Teddy"	John Marascalco, Robert Blackwell	Little Richard	1:28
4.	"I Can Change"	James Murphy, Pat Mahoney	LCD Soundsystem	1:21
5.	"Crown of Love"	Win Butler, Régine Chassagne, Tim Kingsbury, Richard Reed Parry, William Butler	Arcade Fire	4:55
6.	"Androgynous"	Paul Westerberg	The Replacements	3:10
7.	"(Your Love Keeps Lifting Me) Higher and Higher"	Gary Jackson, Carl Smith	Jackie Wilson	5:13

== Artist notes ==
On the back of the jacket, Furman writes an explanation for the recording of the EP, reading:

"A good song takes you far," sang Jackson Browne on tour in the 70s. It's true, and very strange-- how these little three-minute compositions crafted on a whim in a bedroom end up bringing us out on planes and highways, into bars and ballrooms and radio stations, pouring out our hearts and lungs for those who themselves were pulled out of their rooms and into the world by the power of song. Browne understood this: he himself was covering Danny O'Keefe's perfect ode to the bizarre, bittersweet life of a traveling musician, and when I listen to it crammed in a van full of instruments speeding across rainy Germany, it hits hard.

I have always played other people's songs, alone and with friends, at home and on the road. I know our audiences' main interest is in our original songs, and for that I'm honored. But I can't seem to stop playing covers. Every time we are preparing to go on tour I can't help assembling the Boy-Friends and demanding that we learn a new cover song to play live. I listen to so much great music and just ache to be able to inhabit it more fully. I want to be Beck or Melanie or Jackie Wilson. So this record is me playing dress-up, with the help of my incredible band.

(Don't miss that point-- The Boy-Friends are an incredible band that can do anything, without whom my voice would not be in your earholes.)

Thanks for indulging us in these cover versions, pieced together from studio recordings, recordings made on tour in backstage rooms and hotels, and a live show in Austria. I'd like to point out that we've included a song from every decade since rock'n'roll has been a viable marketing category, the 1950s through the 2010s. You are encouraged to look up the original versions if you've never heard them. They blew my mind.

-Ezra, December 2015

== Charts ==
Chart (2016)	Peak position
UK Albums (OCC)	189
