= Perpetual Motion People =

Studio album by Ezra Furman
- Released: July 10, 2015
- Genre: Folk rock, indie rock, doo-wop
- Length: 42:25
- Label: Bella Union

Ezra Furman chronology
| Day of the Dog (2013) | Perpetual Motion People (2015) | Songs by Others (2016) |

Perpetual Motion People is a 2015 album by Ezra Furman.

== Critical reception ==
Professional ratings
Aggregate scores
| Source | Rating |
|---|---|
| Metacritic | 80/100 |
Review scores
| Source | Rating |
| AllMusic | 4/5 stars |
| Consequence of Sound | B- |
| The Observer | 4/5 stars |
| Pitchfork | 6.9/10 |
| Vice (Expert Witness) | (3-star Honorable Mention) |

According to Metacritic, Perpetual Motion People has a score of 80 out of 100, indicating that it has received "generally favorable reviews" from critics.

== Accolades ==
| Publication | Accolade | Year | Rank |
|---|---|---|---|
| The Guardian | The Best Albums of 2015 | 2015 | 25 |
| Rough Trade | Albums of the Year 2015 | 2015 | 4 |
| Gigwise | Gigwise's Albums of the Year | 2015 | 1 |
| Uncut | The Top 75 Albums of the Year | 2015 | 43 |

== Track listing ==
| No. | Title | Length |
|---|---|---|
| 1. | "Restless Year" | 2:25 |
| 2. | "Lousy Connection" | 4:11 |
| 3. | "Hark! To the Music" | 1:25 |
| 4. | "Haunted Head" | 4:49 |
| 5. | "Hour of Deepest Need" | 4:27 |
| 6. | "Wobbly" | 3:00 |
| 7. | "Ordinary Life" | 2:20 |
| 8. | "Tip of a Match" | 2:35 |
| 9. | "Body Was Made" | 3:31 |
| 10. | "Watch You Go By" | 4:09 |
| 11. | "Pot Holes" | 3:18 |
| 12. | "Can I Sleep in Your Brain?" | 3:57 |
| 13. | "One Day I Will Sin No More" | 2:31 |
