= Transangelic Exodus =

Studio album by Ezra Furman
- Released: February 9, 2018
- Genre: Alternative pop
- Length: 42:15
- Label: Bella Union

Ezra Furman chronology
Big Fugitive Life (2016)	Transangelic Exodus (2018)	Twelve Nudes (2019)

Professional ratings
Aggregate scores
Source	Rating
AnyDecentMusic?	8.1/10
Metacritic	85/100
Review scores
Source	Rating
AllMusic	4.5/5 stars
The Independent	4/5 stars
The Irish Times	4/5 stars
Mojo	4/5 stars
The Observer	4/5 stars
Pitchfork	7.4/10
Q	4/5 stars
Record Collector	5/5 stars
Uncut	8/10
Vice	A−

Transangelic Exodus is a studio album by American musician Ezra Furman. It was released in February 2018 under Bella Union.

== Track listing ==
Transangelic Exodus track listing
No.	Title	Length
1.	"Suck the Blood from My Wound"	4:48
2.	"Driving Down to L.A."	3:17
3.	"God Lifts Up the Lowly"	3:48
4.	"No Place"	3:36
5.	"The Great Unknown"	2:46
6.	"Compulsive Liar"	2:44
7.	"Maraschino-Red Dress $8.99 at Goodwill"	2:29
8.	"From a Beach House"	2:34
9.	"Love You So Bad"	3:38
10.	"Come Here Get Away from Me"	3:54
11.	"Peel My Orange Every Morning"	1:41
12.	"Psalm 151"	3:39
13.	"I Lost My Innocence"	3:21

To Them We’ll Always Be Freaks (bonus album of demo and rehearsal tracks from the production of Transangelic Exodus) track listing-
No.	Title	Length
1.	"Come Here Get Away From Me [Ezra solo, January 2015, apartment in Oakland CA]"	2:46
2.	"Love You So Bad [Ezra & Sam & Jamie Riotto at Tiny Telephone in San Francisco, 5-19-2016]"	3:41
3.	"Suck the Blood From My Wound [Ezra solo, unknown date 2016, Oakland]"	4:22
4.	"Love You So Bad [Ben, 10-9-2016, at his apartment in Humboldt Park, Chicago]"	3:25
5.	"Come Here Get Away From Me [Ezra & Tim, late December 2016, Studio Ballistico, Chicago]"	3:49
6.	"Driving Down to L.A. [Tim and Ezra, late December 2016, Ballistico]"	3:35
7.	"No Place [Take 1 - Ezra, Sam, Jorgen & Tim, 1-2-17, Ballistico]"	3:18
8.	"Suck the Blood From My Wound [full band, 1-5-2017, Ballistico]"	4:59
9.	"I Lost My Innocence [Ben, Ezra, Sam & Tim, 1-8-17, Ballistico]"	0:57
10.	"The Great Unknown [Ben, Ezra, Jorgen & Sam, 1-9-2017, Ballistico]"	2:49
11.	"Psalm 151 [Full band, January 2017, Ballistico]"	3:28
12.	"God Lifts Up the Lowly [Ben & Ezra, 1-18-2017, Humboldt Park]"	4:35
13.	"Compulsive Liar [Ben & Ezra, 1-18-17, Humboldt Park]"	2:42
14.	"God Lifts Up the Lowly (instrumental) [Ben, 1-18-2017, Humboldt Park]"	3:19
15.	"Driving Down to L.A. [Ben, Tim & Ezra; Ben's additions 1-19-2017, Humboldt Park]"	3:41
16.	"No Place [Ezra, Sam & Jorgen, 01-19-17, Ballistico]"	3:46
17.	"From A Beach House [Full band, late January 2017, Ballistico]"	2:16
18.	"Maraschino-Red Dress $8.99 at Goodwill [Ezra, Jorgen, Sam & Tim, January/February 2017, Ballistico]"	3:04
19.	"From A Beach House [Sam & Ezra, February 2017, Los Angeles]"	2:21
20.	"No Place [Sam & Ezra, February 2017, Los Angeles]"	3:52
21.	"Peel My Orange Every Morning [Sam & Ezra, 2-7-2017, Los Angeles]"	1:50
22.	"Maraschino-Red Dress $8.99 at Goodwill [Ezra & Ben, 2-15-2017, Humboldt Park]"	2:30
23.	"God Lifts Up the Lowly [Ezra solo, 3-12-17, Ballistico]"	3:33
24.	"I Lost My Innocence [Full band, 3-13-2017 (Take 1), Ballistico]"	3:14
25.	"I Lost My Innocence [Full band, 3-13-2017, Ballistico]"	3:53
26.	"Suck the Blood From My Wound [full band, unknown date 2017, Ballistico]"	3:33

== Accolades ==
Publication	Accolade	Rank	Ref.
Fopp	Top 100 Albums of 2018	44	
Rough Trade	Top 100 Albums of 2018	55	
Uncut Magazine	Top 75 Albums of 2018	16	

== Charts ==
Chart (2018)	Peak position
Austrian Albums (Ö3 Austria)	45
Dutch Albums (Album Top 100)	100
UK Albums (OCC)	51
