= Scott Ellison =

- Born: February 13, 1954 (age 72); Tulsa, Oklahoma, United States
- Genres: Electric blues
- Occupations: Guitarist, singer, songwriter
- Instruments: Guitar, vocals
- Years active: 1970s–present
- Label: Various
- Website: Official website

Scott Ellison (born February 13, 1954) is an American electric blues guitarist, singer and songwriter. From starting working in music in the 1970s, Ellison has released 13 albums since his Chains of Love (1993) debut. Ellison has also written songs which have appeared in television programs and films including Sister Sister, Santa Barbara, Nashville, Buffy the Vampire Slayer, Joan of Arcadia, Saving Grace, and Justified, plus Reindeer Games, Feast of Love and Home Front.

== Biography ==
Scott Ellison was born in Tulsa, Oklahoma, United States. Self taught on guitar, he organised his own band while still a youngster, and gained a wider audience by backing Conway Twitty's daughter, the country singer Jesseca James in 1977, and toured as part of Clarence "Gatemouth" Brown's backing band in 1980–81. Ellison moved from Tulsa to Los Angeles in the mid-1980s, and found employment as a session player working with the Box Tops, the Shirelles, Gary U.S. Bonds, the Coasters, the Marvelettes, J. J. Jackson, the Drifters, and Peaches & Herb.

In the early 1990s, Ellison formed his own blues ensemble and toured in support of artists including Joe Cocker, Roy Orbison, the Fabulous Thunderbirds, Leon Russell, Levon Helm, Bobby Bland and Buddy Guy. His debut album, Chains of Love (1993) was issued on Quicksilver Records, followed by Live at Joey's (1995). In 1996, Ellison returned to live in Tulsa, and released his third album, Steamin', the following year. One Step from the Blues appeared on Ellison's own record label, JSE Records, in 2000. In 2001, Ellison penned a recording deal with Burnside Distribution, which led to the issue of Cold Hard Cash. It was produced and co-written by Dennis Walker, who had worked in a similar capacity with Robert Cray. This album, and the follow-up, Bad Case of the Blues (2003) were the most successful commercially in Ellison's career up to that point. Ellison played the Montreal International Jazz Festival, and both factors led to headlining slots playing at blues festivals in the US, Canada and Europe.

2008 proved to be a pivotal year for Ellison. He considered playing as the opening act for B.B. King at the Tulsa Performing Arts Center on January 26, 2008, a major highlight of his career. Ellison noted "He called me out on stage two times! I still get goosebumps when I think of that night!" The same year Ellison released Ice Storm via Earwig Music Company, which provided his first number one hit on the Blues chart with "Cadillac Woman". In 2011, Walking Through the Fire, was issued on his own label, JSE Records, with songs written with Walt Richmond and Charles Tuperville, who jointly produced the album. In May two years later, Ellison was inducted into the Oklahoma Blues Hall of Fame. He had suffered misfortune in the meantime, coping with the death of his wife in 2010 and father in 2014. Signing with Red Parlor Records in 2015, Ellison next released the Walt Richmond produced album, Elevator Man, on May 12, 2015. A track from the album, "Jesus Loves Me (Baby Why Don't You)" appeared in the film Home Front, and was released as a single on JSE Records.

Further album releases Good Morning Midnight (2017), and Skyline Drive (2020) followed, both on Red Parlor. The COVID-19 pandemic in the United States scuppered touring commitments, but Ellison explained "Being forced to be off the road might have been the best thing that's ever happened to me from a creative standpoint." He co-wrote most of his next album's worth of tracks with Michael Price. Recorded in Tulsa, Ellison provided lead vocals on all but one of the tracks (Chris Campbell sang on the other), played guitar with backing from such notables as percussionists Jamie Oldaker and David Teegarden, plus backing vocalists including Ginger Blake, Oren Waters and Marcella Detroit. The album, There's Something About the Night was released on January 14, 2022. It contained Ellison's version of the Bobby Bland song, "Ain't No Love in the Heart of the City," a track originally co-penned by Price. Ellison took inspiration from the centenary of the Tulsa race massacre. Ellison said, "... even though the song is really about the fallout from a relationship gone south, it's not a big jump to paint with a bigger brush and apply the lyrics in a much broader context. This was actually the first song I started working on for this album. I'm from Tulsa, and when I was growing up I never heard anything about it." As of August 20, 2022, There's Something About the Night was at number 48 on the Roots Music Report's Top 50 Blues Album Chart. He continues to tour in the US and Canada, performing around 200 shows a year. Ellison is presently touring to support his There's Something About the Night.

Ellison has also written songs which have appeared in television programs and films over the years. These include Sister Sister, Santa Barbara, Nashville, Buffy the Vampire Slayer, Joan of Arcadia, Saving Grace, and Justified, plus Reindeer Games, Feast of Love and Home Front.

In May 2022, the Scott Ellison Band premiered "Last Breath," the first single and accompanying video from his upcoming live album, Glendale or Bust, due out later this year.

== Discography ==
=== Albums ===
Year of release	Album title	Record label
1993	Chains of Love	Quicksilver Records
1995	Live at Joey's	Red Hot Records
1997	Steamin'	Fishhead Records
2000	One Step from the Blues	JSE Records
2001	Cold Hard Cash	Burnside Distribution
2003	Bad Case of the Blues	Burnside Distribution
2006	Change of Heart	JSM Record Group/Spring Reign Unlimited
2008	Ice Storm	Earwig Music Company
2012	Walking Through the Fire	JSE Records
2015	Elevator Man	Red Parlor Records
2017	Good Morning Midnight	Red Parlor Records
2020	Skyline Drive	Red Parlor Records
2022	There's Something About the Night	Liberation Hall Records
2023	Zero-2-Sixty	Liberation Hall Records

=== Singles ===
Year of release	Song title	Record label
1990	"Leaving My Love For You"	Interstate 40 Records
2021	"Blowin' Like a Hurricane"	Liberation Hall Records

== See also ==
- List of electric blues musicians
