= Bondi Cigars =

Australian musical group

- Also known as: Shane Pacey and the Cigars
- Origin: Sydney, Australia
- Genres: Blues and roots
- Years active: 1989–present
- Labels: Thorny Devil Records, Only Blues, ABC Records
- Members: Shane Pacey; Alan Britton; Eben Hale; Frank Corby

Bondi Cigars are an Australian blues and roots band. Their album Down in the Valley was nominated for a 2002 ARIA Award for Best Blues & Roots Album.

Bondi Cigars were formed in Sydney in 1989 by Shane Pacey, Alan Britton, Les Karski and Ace Follington. Over time only Pacey and Britton remain from the original lineup. Many members have come and gone before settling on the current lineup.

== Band members ==
- Shane Pacey – Guitar, Vocals
- Alan Britton – Bass, Vocals
- Eben Hale – Guitar, Vocals
- Frank Corby – Drums, Percussion, Vocals

Previous members

- Joel Sutton - Drums
- Andrew Vainauskas – Drums
- Mitch Grainger – Guitar, Harmonica, Vocals
- Declan Kelly – Drums, Vocals
- Clayton Doley – Hammond Organ, Piano, Vocals
- Matt Morrison – Drums, Vocals
- Les Karski – Guitar, Vocals
- Ace Follington – Drums

== Discography ==
=== Albums ===
Title	Details
Bondi Cigars	Released: 1990; Label: ABC Records (846 520–1, 846 520–4); Format: CD, Cassette, LP
Bad Weather Blues	Released: 1992; Label: Larrikin Records (LRF258); Format: CD
After Closing Time	Released: 1995; Label: Larrikin Records (LRF387); Format: CD
Mercy	Released: 1998; Label: Larrikin Records (LRF516); Format: CD
Down in the Valley	Released: 2001; Label: Rouseabout Records (RRR2); Format: 2× CD
12 Lies	Released: 2004; Label: Thorny Devil (TDR01); Format: CD, download
32 Premium Cuts	Released: November 2007; Label: Thorny Devil (TDR02); Format: 2× CD, download; Greatest Hits compilation
Universal Stew	Released: 2009; Label: Only Blues; Format: CD, download
Child in the Desert	Released: 2014; Label: Thorny Devil (TDR06); Format: CD, download

== Awards and nominations ==
=== ARIA Music Awards ===
The ARIA Music Awards is an annual awards ceremony that recognises excellence, innovation, and achievement across all genres of Australian music.

Year	Nominee / work	Award	Result
2002	Down in the Valley	Best Blues & Roots Album	Nominated
