= Goodbye Small Head =

Studio album by Ezra Furman
- Released: May 16, 2025
- Length: 42:20
- Label: Bella Union
- Producer: Brian Deck

Ezra Furman chronology
All of Us Flames (2022)	Goodbye Small Head (2025)

Goodbye Small Head is the seventh studio album by American musician Ezra Furman. It was released on May 16, 2025, by Bella Union, in CD, LP and digital formats.

== Background ==
The album incorporates elements of bossa nova, psychedelic rock, blues, and art pop, and centers on Furman and her mental health. Furman described the album as "orchestral emo" progressive rock.

== Reception ==
Professional ratings
Review scores
Source	Rating
DIY	4/5 stars
Hot Press	8/10 stars
The Line of Best Fit	7/10 stars
Mojo	4/5 stars
MusicOMH	4/5 stars

Daisy Carter of DIY rated the album four and a half out of five, noting "Lyrically, too, Goodbye Small Head is some of her finest work, unafraid as it is to delve into the darkest corners of her mind, as well as give voice to her steely, world-weary wrath." MusicOMH's John Murphy gave the album a rating of four stars and described it as "another startling record from one of the most exciting songwriters around right now."

Martin Aston of Mojo, rating the album four stars, referred to it as "her calmest record yet, flecked with ballads and strings." The Line of Best Fit's Dom Lepore assigned Goodbye Small Head a seven-out-of-ten rating, noting "In Furman's catalogue, this is a novel and necessary display of fervence in this hypervigilant era." Hot Press, giving it a score of eight, stated in its review of the album that "the songs are explicitly about the act – and the art – of losing control."

== Track listing ==
All tracks are written by Ezra Furman, except "I Need the Angel", written by Alex Walton.

Goodbye Small Head track listing
No.	Title	Length
1.	"Grand Mal"	3:16
2.	"Sudden Storm"	3:16
3.	"Jump Out"	3:15
4.	"Power of the Moon"	4:26
5.	"You Mustn't Show Weakness"	2:12
6.	"Submission"	3:54
7.	"Veil Song"	3:13
8.	"Slow Burn"	3:09
9.	"You Hurt Me, I Hate You"	4:03
10.	"Strange Girl"	3:32
11.	"A World of Love and Care"	3:14
12.	"I Need the Angel"	4:50
Total length:		42:20

== Charts ==
Chart performance for Goodbye Small Head
Chart (2025)	Peak position
Scottish Albums (Official Charts)	38
UK Album Downloads (Official Charts)	23
UK Independent Albums (Official Charts)	3
