= Delta Moon =

American swamp blues, blues rock, and blues band

- Origin: Inman Park, Atlanta, Georgia, United States
- Genres: Swamp blues, blues rock, blues
- Years active: Late 1990s–present
- Labels: Various including Delta Moon, Fontana North, Red Parlor Records and ZYX Music
- Members: Mark Johnson; Franher Joseph; Vic Stafford
- Past members: Tom Gray; Gina Leigh; Kristin Markiton
- Website: Official website

Delta Moon is an American swamp blues, blues rock, and blues band. They originated in Inman Park, Atlanta, Georgia, United States. The group's name came to founder member, Mark Johnson, whilst on a pilgrimage to Muddy Waters' cabin near Clarksdale, Mississippi. In 2003, Delta Moon won the International Blues Challenge. They have released a number of albums on various record labels, including Low Down, which Down Beat magazine named in their "best albums of 2015".

Referring to the band's twin guitar-led sound, Chicago Sun-Times stated "Gray and Johnson's double-slide style works to perfection."

== Career ==
One of the band's founders, Tom Gray, was born in Washington, D.C. and grew up in Arlington County, Virginia and Georgia. His family home is located in the North Carolina mountains. He was previously the songwriter, vocalist and keyboard player of the 1980s new wave band, The Brains. Gray wrote their most notable song "Money Changes Everything" (1978), which was successfully covered by Cyndi Lauper in 1984. By the late 1980s, he started playing the lap steel guitar. Until his death he was the band's main songwriter, and his songs have been recorded by Cyndi Lauper, Manfred Mann, Carlene Carter, and Bonnie Bramlett, amongst others. In 2008, the Roots Music Association named him the 'Blues Songwriter of the Year'.

The other founding band member, Mark Johnson, was born Ravenna, Ohio. He played guitar in high school bands before relocating in the early 1990s to Atlanta, Georgia, forming the Rude Northerners, and then worked with another Atlanta band, The Crawdads. He graduated from standard tuning and began playing bottleneck slide guitar.

A chance meeting in an Atlanta music store brought Gray and Johnson into contact and they began playing together in local clubs. The duo were later joined by the female singer Gina Leigh and expanded their performing range. Delta Moon's self-titled debut album, which was released on their own label in 2002, contained a cover version of Son House's "Preachin' the Blues".

In 2003, Delta Moon won the International Blues Challenge. The same year they performed at the Sarasota Blues Fest. They also appeared at the Bull Durham Blues Festival. In June 2003, Delta Moon released Live, recorded at Tree Sound Studios in Atlanta, which was followed in 2004 by Goin' Down South. The album included a cover of the David Bowie and Iggy Pop penned "Nightclubbing," whilst "Shake Something Loose" was co-written by Gray with Randall Bramblett. Later that year Leigh left the band, and was replaced by Kristin Markiton. Howlin' was their fourth album in as many years and included tracks written by Frank Edwards ("Put Your Arms Around Me") and Jessie Mae Hemphill ("Lovin' in the Moonlight"). In 2007, further personnel changes saw Darren Stanley, originally from Stone Mountain, Georgia, join on drums alongside bassist Franher Joseph.

Clear Blue Flame (2007) saw Delta Moon without a female singer since their early days, following the departure of Markiton. One of the album's tracks was "Jessie Mae", which was dedicated to and about the blues singer Jessie Mae Hemphill. In addition, Gray reworked "Money Changes Everything" to incorporate a fiddle section quite unlike either the Brains' or Lauper's arrangements. The title track stated that "good moonshine burns with a clear, blue flame". Hell Bound Train (2010) was the band's fifth studio album. In 2012, Black Cat Oil, followed a Delta Moon tradition by closing the set of tracks with a cover; this time with Mississippi Fred McDowell's "Write Me a Few of Your Lines". Two live albums were self released in 2013; Life's A Song - Live Volume One and Turn Around When Possible - Live Volume 2. Blues411 named Turn Around When Possible one of the "best live blues albums of that year". In 2015, the addition of Vic Stafford completed the line-up.

Delta Moon's album, Low Down, was released in May 2015, and included nine original songs penned by Gray, and covers of tracks written by Bob Dylan, Tom Waits and Skip James. In January 2016, Down Beat magazine named Low Down in the "best albums of 2015". Vintage Guitar noted that "Delta Moon is deep blues with a fury... Hot stuff!"

Tom Gray died on October 16, 2021, aged 70, from cancer.

== Band members ==
=== Current ===
- Mark Johnson – slide guitar (born Ravenna, Ohio)
- Franher Joseph – bass (born Haiti)
- Vic Stafford – drums (born Asheville, North Carolina)

=== Former ===
- Tom Gray – lead vocals, slide guitar (born Washington, D.C., c.1951; died October 16, 2021)
- Gina Leigh – vocals
- Kristin Markiton – vocals

== Discography ==
=== Albums ===
Year	Title	Label
2002	Delta Moon	CD Baby / Delta Moon
2003	Live	CD Baby / Delta Moon
2004	Goin' Down South	CD Baby / Delta Moon
2005	Howlin'	Delta Moon
2007	Clear Blue Flame	Jumping Jack Records
2010	Hell Bound Train	Fontana North / Red Parlor Records
2012	Black Cat Oil	ZYX Music / Red Parlor Records
2013	Life's A Song - Live Volume One	Self-released
2013	Turn Around When Possible - Live Volume 2	Self-released
2015	Low Down	Heartfixer Music / Jumping Jack Records
2017	Cabbagetown	Jumping Jack Records
2018	Babylon is Falling	Landslide Records
