= Queer Lounge =

The Queer Lounge is a 501(c)(3) non-profit organization that establishes hospitality suites at the top film festivals in the world. Its primary function is to provide information and to educate those attending the film festival about the films with gay content (storylines, plots or characters) or created by gay filmmakers.

They do this by creating an upscale hospitality suite and event space during the film festival where anyone, gay or straight, can stop by and learn about the films. They hold press conferences and panel discussions in their space for films they support. The space is one of the few truly public spaces during a film festival without being invite only. At night, the space becomes a top venue for film premiere and VIP parties- especially at the Sundance Film Festival. However, they do also host gay centric events including parties known as Glamdance and Homos Away From Home.

The Queer Lounge was started at the January 2003 Sundance Film Festival by former film executive Ellen Huang who saw a need for a space for gay people. She based the idea off a Cannes Film Festival event called the West Hollywood Lounge, which wasn't about gay and lesbian people, but was created by the West Hollywood Convention and Visitors Bureau. The idea evolved into the Queer Lounge. The Queer Lounge is supported through corporate sponsorship. Past sponsors include Showtime, Absolut, Intel, Plantronics, Monster Energy Drink, Perrier, Aquafina, and Dell Computers.

The Queer Lounge has successfully promoted such Sundance Film Festival hits like Tarnation, The Education of Shelby Knox and Quinceanera (the first winner of both the Audience Award and the Grand Jury prize at the Sundance Film Festival) with much success. Queer Lounge support can really make the difference to help a film's presence during the Sundance Film Festival.

The Queer Lounge revived in 2003 a famous Sundance Film Festival party known as Homos Away from Home with publicist Mickey Cottrell and John Cameron Mitchell. This party is now considered to be one of the top parties at the Sundance Film Festival, secretly attended by straight celebrities and film executives. It traditionally happens on the second Thursday of the Sundance Film Festival. Queer Lounge rents out their space at Sundance to non-gay films and have hosted premieres for films such as Rize and Wristcutters: A Love Story.

In 2006, Queer Lounge successfully created its events during the Toronto International Film Festival (TIFF), and became a sanctioned event of the Festival- the first-ever organization to be dubbed a "TIFF Exra." Queer Lounge panels were listed officially on TIFF's site. Some of the highlights of Queer Lounge's events at TIFF included an 1,100 person party for the film Shortbus at the Phoenix Theatre with 44 performers on stage. Queer Lounge also held two panels and the first-ever queer and queer-friendly professional networking brunch at the Anglican, Church of the Redeemer at the intersection of Bay Street and Bloor Avenue. A phenomenon in Toronto in its inaugural year, Queer Lounge drew cross-over press from Toronto's gay/lesbian newspaper Xtra, the mainstream Eye Weekly, and the national publications Maclean's and The Globe and Mail.
