= Banging Down the Doors =

Studio album by Ezra Furman & The Harpoons
- Released: 2007
- Label: Minty Fresh

Ezra Furman & The Harpoons chronology
Banging Down the Doors (2007)	Inside the Human Body (2008)

Banging Down the Doors is the first officially released album by Ezra Furman & The Harpoons. It was released in 2007. The titles on the album are largely the same as those originally recorded and self-released by the band as Beat Beat Beat, but they were all re-recorded for Banging Down the Doors.

== Track listing ==
1. "Mother's Day"
2. "How Long, Diana?"
3. "I Wanna Be A Sheep"
4. "I Wanna Be Ignored"
5. "American Highway"
6. "God Is A Middle-Aged Woman"
7. "Hotel Room In Casablanca"
8. "Halloween Snow"
9. "The Little Red-Haired Girl"
10. "My Soul Has Escaped From My Body"
11. "She's All I Got Left"
12. "I Dreamed Of Moses"
13. "Lydia Sherman"
