= Living with Your Ghost =

Studio album by Kara Grainger
- Released: 1 June 2018
- Studio: Wire Recording Studio, Austin, Texas
- Genre: Roots; blues; soul
- Length: 49:42
- Label: Station House Records
- Producer: Anders Osborne; Kara Grainger

Kara Grainger chronology
Shiver & Sigh (2013)	Living with Your Ghost (2018)	That's How I Got to Memphis (2025)

Living with Your Ghost is the fourth solo studio album by United States-based blues rock singer/songwriter/guitarist from Australia, Kara Grainger. It was released on 1 June 2018.

== Development ==
The album was recorded at the Wire Recording Studio in Austin, Texas. Grainger wrote or co-wrote all but one of the songs on the album, the exception being a cover of her friend Jackie Bristow's song "Broken Record". The album ranges from blues rock, rock and roll, and Americana.

== Track listing ==
No.	Title	Writer(s)	Length
1.	"Living with Your Ghost"	Kara Grainger	4:08
2.	"Working My Way Back Home"	Grainger	4:12
3.	"Man with Soul"	Grainger, Trevor Manear	3:40
4.	"Nowhere to Be Found"	Grainger	4:06
5.	"You're in New Orleans"	Grainger, Anders Osborne, Andrew Duhon	3:23
6.	"Groove Train"	Grainger, Osborne	4:40
7.	"Reason to My Verse"	Grainger	3:41
8.	"Broken Record"	Jackie Bristow, Mark Punch	3:43
9.	"Favourite Sin"	Grainger, Osborne, Julia King	3:42
10.	"Nobody But You"	Grainger	4:34
11.	"Love Will Get You Through the Door"	Grainger, Osborne	3:52
12.	"Freedom Song"	Grainger	6:01
Total length:			49:42

== Personnel ==
Musicians

- Kara Grainger - vocals, guitar
- Anders Osborne - guitar, backing vocals
- Ivan Neville - keys, backing vocals
- Dave Monsey - bass
- J.J. Johnson - drums
- Mark Rudin - trumpet
- George Stanford - trombone
- The Texas Horns

- Mark "Kaz" Kazanoff - tenor saxophone
- John Mills - baritone saxophone
- Al Gomez - trumpet
- James Fenner - congas

Production

- Produced by Anders Osborne and Kara Grainger
- Executive production by Don Ritter
- Engineered by Stuart Sullivan
- Additional engineering by Don Ritter
- Additional engineering by Carter Greeves
- Mastered by William Bowden
