= Inside the Human Body =

Studio album by Ezra Furman & The Harpoons
- Released: 2008
- Label: Minty Fresh

Ezra Furman & The Harpoons chronology
Banging Down the Doors (2007)	Inside the Human Body (2008)	Mysterious Power (2011)

Inside the Human Body is a 2008 album by Ezra Furman & The Harpoons. It was Furman's second officially released album, following the previous year's Banging Down the Doors.

== Track listing ==
1. "We Should Fight"
2. "Take Off Your Sunglasses"
3. "The Stakes Are High"
4. "The Dishwasher"
5. "The Faceless Boy"
6. "Big Deal"
7. "If I Was a Baby"
8. "The Worm In The Apple"
9. "The World Is Alive"
10. "Springfield, IL"
11. "The Moon"
12. "Weak Knees"
