= Red Parlor Records =

Red Parlor
- Founded: 2005
- Founder: Steven Goff, Jerry Krenach
- Distributor(s): Entertainment One
- Genre: Rock, folk, blues
- Country of origin: U.S.
- Location: Norwalk, Connecticut
- Official website: www.redparlor.com

Red Parlor Records (Red Parlor Entertainment Group) is an American independent record label, founded in 2005 by Steven Goff and Jerry Krenach. Red Parlor is based in Norwalk, Connecticut, and distributes its releases through Entertainment One in the US, Proper Music Distribution in the UK, and digital downloads worldwide through The Orchard/Sony Music. The label's focus is roots, rock, and blues genres. Red Parlor is known for records by Chris Whitley, David Olney, and Ezra Furman and the Harpoons.

== Artists ==
- Chris Whitley & the Bastard Club
- David Olney
- Delta Moon
- Scott Ellison
- Ezra Furman and the Harpoons
- Cristina Vane
- Kasey Anderson
- Manda Mosher
- Matt Keating
- Carla Olson & Todd Wolfe – The Hidden Hills Sessions – May 2019
