= Ezra Furman and the Harpoons =

American rock band

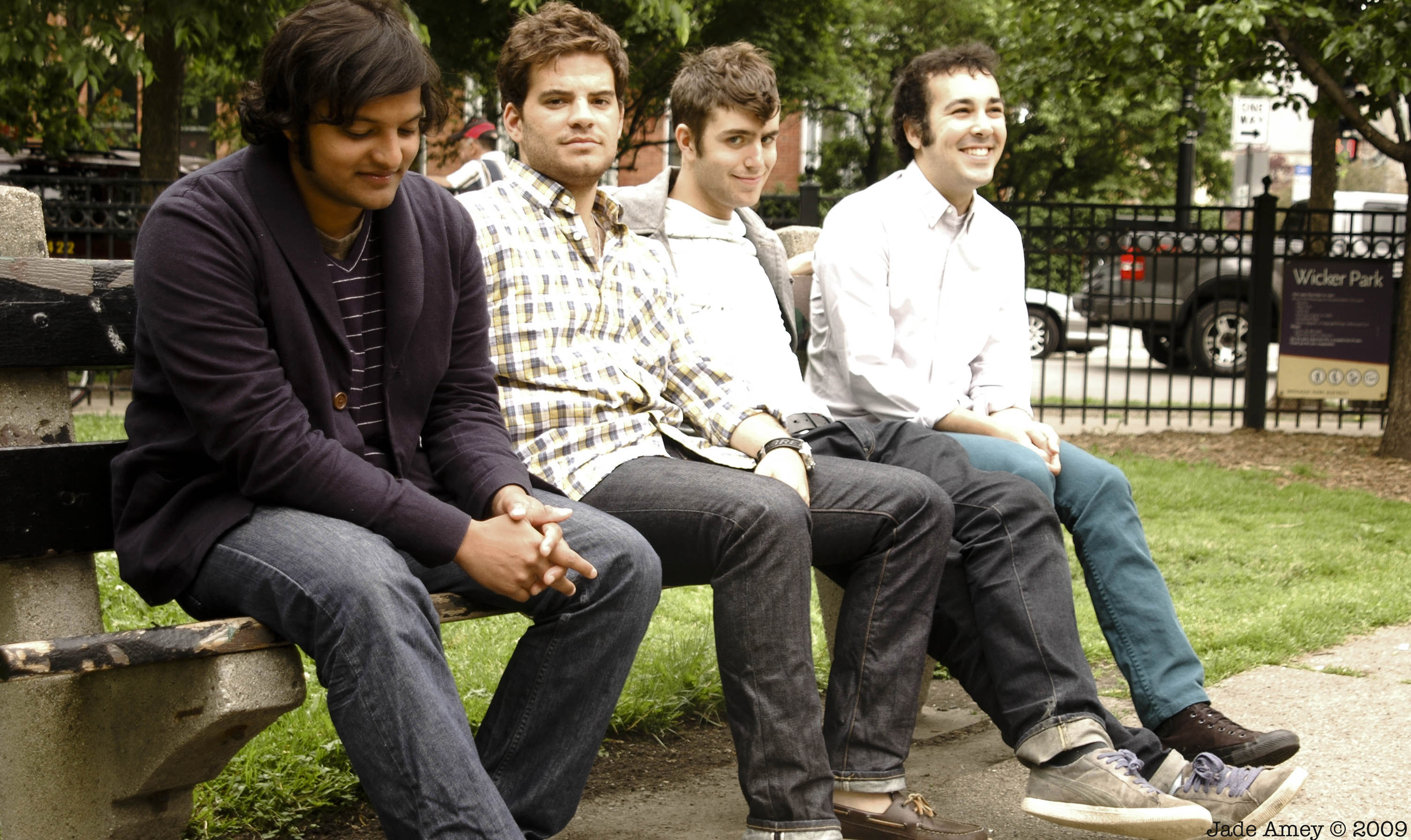
- Ezra Furman (L-R: Job, Adam, Ezra, Andrew)

Background information
- Origin: Chicago, Illinois; Somerville, Massachusetts, U.S.
- Genres: Indie rock, folk rock
- Years active: 2006-2011
- Labels: Minty Fresh, Bar/None, Red Parlor
- Past members: Ezra Furman; Job Mukkada; Adam Abrutyn; Andrew Langer
- Website: Official website

Ezra Furman and the Harpoons were a four-piece rock band active between 2006 and 2011. The band consisted of Ezra Furman (vocals, guitar), Job Mukkada (bass guitar), Adam Abrutyn (drums), and Andrew Langer (guitar). They formed at Tufts University in 2006.

== History ==
They self-released their first album, Beat Beat Beat in June 2006, which was recorded in a series of college dorm rooms and engineered by former band member, Jahn Sood, and Dave Kant from Outtake Records.

In August 2007, the group signed with Minty Fresh Records for a two album contract and released their debut album Banging Down the Doors, produced by Brian Deck for Minty Fresh Records. Banging Down the Doors was met with critical acclaim, making several best of 2007 lists. Their second album, Inside the Human Body, was released in October 2008, and was also well received by critics.

After their contract with Minty Fresh Records expired, they released a self-produced album titled Moon Face, which included live recordings and some of Furman's solo work. When the album was ordered through the band's website, one could include a small passage about themselves, and as an addition to the album, Furman would write a song singularly for the purchaser.

Their third studio album, Mysterious Power, was released on April 5, 2011. through Red Parlor Records. It was recorded in Los Angeles and produced by Doug Boehm.

Ezra Furman has since created three solo albums and has toured with her band Ezra Furman and the Boy-Friends.

== Discography ==
=== Albums ===
- Beat Beat Beat (2006)
- Banging Down the Doors (2007)
- Inside the Human Body (2008)
- Mysterious Power (2011)

=== Compilations ===
- Moon Face: Bootlegs and Road Recordings 2006-2009 (2009)
