= Shadows on the Ground =

Studio album by Kieran Kane
- Released: October 8, 2002
- Recorded: February 7 – July 5–6, 2001
- Studios: Moraine Studio, Nashville TN
- Genre: Country
- Length: 40:31
- Label: Dead Reckoning Records
- Producer: Kieran Kane

Kieran Kane chronology
The Blue Chair (2000)	Shadows on the Ground (2002)	You Can't Save Everybody (2004)

Professional ratings
Review scores
Source	Rating
Allmusic	4.5/5 stars

Shadows on the Ground is the sixth solo studio album by Kieran Kane. The album was Kane's fourth solo album for Dead Reckoning Records, the label which he founded in 1994 along with fellow musicians Kevin Welch, Mike Henderson, Tammy Rogers, and Harry Stinson. This album was recorded live at Moraine Studio in Nashville, TN on July 5 & 6, 2002 (except for track 11 - recorded on 2-7-2001). Charlene Blevins of Paste magazine writes, "With Shadows on the Ground, Kane doesn’t exactly come full circle so much as he colors in the sphere of his career with a harmonious rainbow."

== Track listing ==
No.	Title	Writer(s)	Length
1.	"Ain't Holdin' Back"	Kieran Kane; Sean Locke	4:44
2.	"Will You Miss Me"	A. P. Carter	3:37
3.	"Shadows On The Ground"	Kieran Kane; Sean Locke; John Hadley	3:14
4.	"Mountain Song"	Kieran Kane; Sean Locke; Chad Jeffers	4:25
5.	"One Raindrop"	Kieran Kane; John Hadley	3:12
6.	"The Baby Keeps Cryin'"	Kieran Kane; Sean Locke	4:47
7.	"Shut Up"	Kieran Kane; John Hadley	3:35
8.	"Better When You Take It Slow"	Kieran Kane; Sean Locke	3:28
9.	"Handsome Molly"	Traditional	3:52
10.	"June Carter (Sure Can Sing)"	Kieran Kane; John Hadley; Kevin Welch	2:47
11.	"Harmony" (duet with Claudia Scott)	Kieran Kane; Claudia Scott	2:50
Total length:			40:31

== Musicians ==
- Kieran Kane: Guitar, Mandolin, Vocals
- Mike Henderson: Harmonica, Mandolin, National Steel Guitar)
- Sean Locke: Guitar, Vocals
- Tammy Rogers: Fiddle, Mandolin, Vocals
- Harry Stinson: Autoharp, Drums, Vocals, Pans, Pots
- Glenn Worf: Bass
- Fats Kaplin: Fiddle, Bajo Sexto, Button Accordion
- Kevin Welch: Guitar
- Claudia Scott: Vocals

== Production ==
- Kieran Kane: Producer, Cover Painting
- Philip Scoggins: Assistant Engineer
- Tracy Wallner: Art Direction
- John Hadley: Photography
- Kevin Rafferty: Photography
- Mils Logan: Recorder, Engineer

All track information and credits were taken from the CD liner notes.
