= Beneath My Wheels =

Studio album by Kevin Welch
- Released: June 22, 1999
- Genre: Country
- Length: 54:22
- Label: Dead Reckoning
- Producer: Kevin Welch, Peter Coleman & Charlie White

Kevin Welch chronology
Life Down Here on Earth (1995)	Beneath My Wheels (1999)	11/12/13: Live in Melbourne (2000)

Beneath My Wheels is Kevin Welch's fourth solo album. This was Welch's second album for Dead Reckoning Records, which he co-founded in 1994 with fellow musicians Kieran Kane, Mike Henderson, Tammy Rogers, and Harry Stinson.

== Critical reception ==
Professional ratings
Review scores
Source	Rating
AllMusic	3/5 stars

Heather Phares of AllMusic writes, "Kevin Welch's fourth album, Beneath My Wheels features more of the expansive songwriting for which he has become known in alt country and folk circles."

Brian Baker of Country Standard Time writes, "Most amazing is the sonic consistency of the disc, recorded over a long stretch of time and in a number of locales with different sets of musicians."

Geoffrey Hines of The Washington Post begins his review with, "Kevin Welch is such a great singer that even his weaker songs sound good."

CD Shakedown begins a review of the album with, "After a four-year absence from the recording studio, singer Kevin Welch returns with the beautiful and somber, Beneath My Wheels."

No Depression concludes their review with, "Welch has finally produced the masterpiece he’s long had in him. Beneath My Wheels is full of uncommon musical variety and starkly beautiful images that resonate long after the disc has finished playing."

== Track listing ==
All tracks are written by Kevin Welch

No.	Title	Length
1.	"Everybody's Gotta Walk"	3:51
2.	"Anna Lise Please"	5:31
3.	"Hill Country Girl"	3:42
4.	"Fold Your Wings"	4:43
5.	"Beneath My Wheels"	4:51
6.	"Bastard Nation"	5:43
7.	"Every Little Lie"	4:38
8.	"Five Million One Thousand Miles"	3:31
9.	"Full Moon over Christiania"	3:50
10.	"Shores of Stone"	4:07
11.	"Faith Comes Later"	3:59
12.	"While I Was Loving You"	5:56
Total length:		54:22

== Musicians ==
- Kevin Welch: Vocals, Acoustic Guitar
- Mike Henderson: Electric Guitar
- Frank Birck Pontoppidan: Electric Guitar
- Kieran Kane: Octave Mandolin
- Fats Kaplin: Violin, Accordion, Pedal Steel
- Charlie White: Bass, Guitar, Harmonica, Tambourine, Background Vocals
- Gustav Ljunggren: Keyboards
- Glenn Worf: Bass
- Henrik Schou Poulsen: Bass
- Harry Stinson: Drums, Hand Drums, Shaker, Background Vocals
- Frank Marstokk: Drums
- Phil Jones: Percussion, Tambourine
- Tony Harrell: Organ
- Sandy Bull: Sarod
- Byron House: Banjo
- Gillian Welch: Background Vocals
- David Rawlings: Background Vocals
- Bekka Bramlett: Background Vocals
- Isaac Freeman: Background Vocals
- Joseph Rice: Background Vocals

== Production ==
- Kevin Welch: Producer
- Frank Marstokk: Producer
- Peter Coleman: Engineer, Mixing
- Charlie White: Producer, Mixing, Overdub Engineer
- Teis Frandsen: Engineer
- Bob Etherington: Engineer
- Philip Scoggins: Engineer, Mixing, Overdub Engineer, Vocal Engineer
- Jason Breckling: Assistant Engineer, Mixing Assistant
- Dan Lefler: Assistant Engineer
- Phil Jones: Mixing, Overdub Engineer
- Mills Logan: Editing
- Angela Haglund: Design
- Señor McGuire: Photography

All track information and credits were taken from the CD liner notes.
