= Millionaire (Kevin Welch album) =

Studio album by Kevin Welch
- Released: July 9, 2002
- Recorded: September, 1999 – January, 2001
- Studio: Moraine, Creative Workshop, Nashville, Tennessee; Feedback Studio, Arhus, Denmark
- Genre: Country
- Length: 49:32
- Label: Dead Reckoning
- Producer: Kevin Welch, Frank Marstokk & Frank Birch Pontoppidan

Kevin Welch chronology
11/12/13: Live in Melbourne (with Kieran Kane) (2000)	Millionaire (2002)	You Can't Save Everybody (with Kieran Kane and Fats Kaplin) (2004)

Professional ratings
Review scores
Source	Rating
Allmusic	3/5 stars

Millionaire is the fifth studio album by Kevin Welch. Welch was backed by The Danes, a Copenhagen-based band, on this album. The album was Welch's fourth album for Dead Reckoning Records, the label founded by Welch in 1994 along with fellow musicians Kieran Kane, Mike Henderson, Tammy Rogers and Harry Stinson.

== Critical reception ==
William Ruhlmann of AllMusic concludes his review with, "On earlier records, you yearned to hear what a real singer could do with his compositions, but on Millionaire he has come into his own as a performer."

John Kenyon of Pop Matters writes, "Welch's songwriting is as sharp as ever, and he continues to grow into his craggy voice. Few people hear his music, but for those of us who seek it out, Millionaire is another gem of a record."

== Track listing ==
All tracks are written by Kevin Welch, unless otherwise noted

No.	Title	Writer(s)	Length
1.	"Millionaire"		3:59
2.	"Blanket Of Snow"	Kevin Welch; Gary Scruggs	2:53
3.	"Long Cold Train"	John Hadley	6:24
4.	"Witness"		5:15
5.	"Choose To Believe"	Kevin Welch; Charlie White	3:33
6.	"Glorious Bounties"	Kevin Welch; Dustin Welch	3:29
7.	"Killing Myself"	Kevin Welch; Harry Stinson	4:28
8.	"The Sun King And The Winter Moon"		3:54
9.	"I Can Sure Love You"		2:57
10.	"Queen Of The Slipstream"	Van Morrison	4:19
11.	"When The Sun Shines Down On Me"	Kevin Welch; Mark Germino	4:00
12.	"Stray Dog"		4:21
Total length:			49:32

== Musicians ==
- Kevin Welch: Primary Artist, Vocals, Acoustic Guitar, Mando-Guitar, Background Vocals
- Gustav Ljunggren: Lap Steel Guitar, Mando-Guitar, Mandolin, Mini Moog, Hammond Organ, Piano, Saxophone, Synthesizer, Trumpet, Wurlitzer, Background Vocals
- Frank Birch Pontoppidan: Banjo, Engineer, Baritone Guitar, Electric Guitar, Mixing, Moog Bass, Electric Piano, Background Vocals
- Frank Marstokk: Drums, Maracas, Moog Bass, Electric Piano, Synthesizer, Background Vocals
- Fredrick Damsgaard: Bass, Electric Baritone Guitar, Background Vocals
- Emil Carlsson: Violin
- Kieran Kane: Mandolin
- Claudia Scott: Background Vocals

== Production ==
- Kevin Welch: Producer
- Frank Marstokk: Producer
- Frank Birch Pontoppidan: Producer
- Jan Eliasson: Mastering
- John Hadley: Cover Painting
- Angela Haglund: Design
- Señor McGuire: Photography
- Gorm Valentin: Photography
- Philip Scoggins: Assistant Engineer

All track information and credits were taken from the album's liner notes.
