= Life Down Here on Earth =

Studio album by Kevin Welch
- Released: 18 July 1995
- Recorded: 24–25 January 1995
- Genre: Country
- Length: 41:16
- Label: Dead Reckoning Records
- Producer: Harry Stinson & Kevin Welch

Kevin Welch chronology
Western Beat (1992)	Life Down Here on Earth (1995)	Beneath My Wheels (1999)

Professional ratings
Review scores
Source	Rating
Allmusic	3/5 stars

Life Down Here on Earth is the third studio album by Kevin Welch. This album marks his debut on the artist-owned-and-operated Dead Reckoning Records, which he co-founded in 1994 with fellow musicians Kieran Kane, Mike Henderson, Tammy Rogers, and Harry Stinson.

== Critical reception ==
William Ruhlmann of AllMusic says, "Kevin Welch is a card-carrying member of the Texas school of songwriting."

Jana Pendragon of Country Standard Time concludes her review by saying, "A special highlight is the fast-paced and provocative "One Way Rider," written with Kostas and the title cut, which ends the disc on a high, bluesy note."

Fitzgerald's Night Club writes, "Kevin's first release for DR, Life Down Here on Earth, was greeted with rave reviews."

John Kenyon of Pop Matters writes of Welch and this album, "He formed the Dead Reckoning label in 1995 with like-minded fence-straddlers Kieran Kane, Tammy Rogers, and Harry Stinson. His first album for that label, Life Down Here On Earth, got notice if for no other reason than for the fact that it was among the first batch of releases from this high-profile band of renegades. It found Welch tapping into his roots a bit, sounding more like a Guy Clark acolyte than a possible contributor (to) the country charts."

Peter Margasak of The Chicago Reader comments that, "Welch's Life Down Here on Earth is an exuberant, literate collection that opens country up, stretching it from Steve Earle-ish twang to Bob Dylan-esque narratives"

Gerry Galipaul of Pause&Play writes, "The business at hand is “Life Down Here On Earth,” an authentic country-soul-gospel stew filled with fresh writing and a keen wit. The reviews for a truly Americana album free of big-label hype and manipulation have been overwhelming."

Rick Ellis of All Your Screens writes of the title track on this album, "There are a lot of great Kevin Welch songs to fall in love with and there isn't a better place to start than "Life Down Here On Earth."

Richard Skanse of Lone Star Magazine notes of the album's opening number, "Incidentally, Welch opened Life Down Here on Earth with a song he co-wrote with (John) Hadley called "Pushing Up Daisies." Six years later, the song quietly popped up again on a record called Scarecrow by another Okie of some renown: Garth Brooks."

Lee Nichols of The Austin Chronicle writes, "Welch's new Life Down Here on Earth, his third album, and the first since leaving the corporate giant Warner Bros. label Reprise. Despite his newfound label independence, this new disc doesn't really offer any changes from previous works - meaning it's his usual great collection of well-written songs, surrounded by extremely skilled sidemen. As always, Welch takes country onto an intellectual plane, exhibiting a Joe Ely-ish zest for life and a Gram Parsons-like high and lonesome. It's an impressive first American release for the fledgling label, and it will probably satisfy Welch's goal, which is to just make a decent living writing and singing songs."

- See original reviews for full articles. Links can be found in the references section of this article.

== Track listing ==
All tracks are written by Kevin Welch, unless otherwise noted

No.	Title	Writer(s)	Length
1.	"Pushing Up Daisies"	Kevin Welch; John Hadley	3:25
2.	"Troublesome Times"		5:55
3.	"Wilson's Tracks"		3:05
4.	"I Feel Fine Today"		2:31
5.	"A Feast Of Bread And Water"	Kevin Welch; John Hadley	4:51
6.	"Wishing For You"		3:53
7.	"Kicking Back In Amsterdam"		5:01
8.	"The Love I Have For You"		4:51
9.	"One Way Rider"	Kevin Welch; Kostas	3:55
10.	"Life Down Here On Earth"	Kevin Welch; Gary Scruggs	3:49
Total length:			41:16

== Musicians ==
- Kevin Welch: Acoustic guitar
- Harry Stinson: Drums & harmony vocals
- Glenn Worf: Bass & left hand piano
- Kieran Kane: Mandolin, octave mandolin & harmony vocals
- Mike Henderson: Electric & national
- Al Anderson: Electric guitar & (acoustic guitar on "Life Down Here On Earth")
- Fats Kaplin: Accordion, pedal steel, fiddle & penny whistle
- Tammy Rogers: Fiddle, viola, mandolin, tenor banjo & harmony vocals
- The Fairfield Four: Vocals on "Life Down Here On Earth"
- Reese Wynans: Piano on "Life Down Here On Earth" & "Troublesome Times"

== Live recordings ==
- 2/29/94, tracks 1, 3 & 6 recorded & mixed live to DAT by the Rough Sextet at Treasure Isle by Peter Coleman.
- Glenn Worf: String bass
- Kieran Kane: Mandolin
- Tammy Rogers: Fiddle & viola
- Fats Kaplin: Fiddle & accordion
- Kevin Welch: Acoustic guitar
- Harry Stinson: Drums

== Production ==
- Jim Herrington: Photography
- John Hadley: Illustration
- B. Middleworth: Design

All track information and credits were taken from the CD liner notes.
