= The Blue Chair =

Studio album by Kieran Kane
- Released: October 24, 2000
- Studio: Creative Workshop (Berry Hill, Tennessee)
- Genre: Country
- Length: 39:31
- Label: Dead Reckoning Records

Kieran Kane chronology
11/12/13: Live in Melbourne (with Kevin Welch) (2000)	The Blue Chair (2000)	Shadows on the Ground (2002)

Professional ratings
Review scores
Source	Rating
Allmusic	1.5/5 stars

The Blue Chair is the fifth solo album by Kieran Kane, his third for Dead Reckoning Records, the label founded by Kane in 1994 along with fellow musicians Kevin Welch, Mike Henderson, Tammy Rogers, and Harry Stinson. Robert Wooldridge reviewed The Blue Chair on Country Standard Time website favorably, stating "Though unlikely to bring Kane the commercial success he enjoyed with The O'Kanes, this release reinforces Kane's reputation as one of today's best alt.-country singer-songwriters."

== Track listing ==
All tracks are written by Kieran Kane, unless otherwise noted.

No.	Title	Writer(s)	Length
1.	"Honeymoon Wine"	Kieran Kane; Bruce McMeans	4:23
2.	"Love Is Fair"	Jesse Winchester	4:34
3.	"Same Old Blues"	Kieran Kane; Kevin Welch; Allison Moorer	4:05
4.	"Four Questions"		3:06
5.	"I'm Sorry"		3:33
6.	"Tu Es Avec Moi"		3:43
7.	"Irish Heartbeat"	Van Morrison	4:22
8.	"I'll Go On Loving You"		4:01
9.	"Nous Sommes Les Mêmes"		3:56
10.	"Rosie's Gone"	Kieran Kane; Jamie O'Hara	3:48
Total length:			39:31

- Track information and credits taken from the album's liner notes.

== Musicians ==
- Kieran Kane: Vocals, Guitar (Gut String), Acoustic Guitar, mandolin (Octave), Percussion
- Glenn Worf: Bass
- Harry Stinson: Drums, Percussion, Backing vocals on tracks 5, 7, 8
- Dan Dugmore: Electric Guitar, Acoustic Guitar, Guitar (Gut String), Steel Guitar (Pedal), Resonator Guita
- John Jarvis: Piano, Organ (B3)
- Steve Mandile: Synthesizer on track 6
- Allison Moorer: Backing vocals on track 5
- Claudia Scott: Backing vocals on tracks 7, 8
- Kevin Welch: Backing vocals on tracks 4, 5
- Kieran Kane: Backing vocals on track 9
- Kim Keys: Backing vocals on track 6
- Tabitha Fair: Backing vocals on track 6

== Production ==
- Kieran Kane: Cover Painting
- Brydget Carrillo: Design
- Brent Maher: Engineer
- Nils Logan:Engineer
- Dave Shipley: Master
- Mils Logan: Recorder, Mixer
- Brydget Carrillo: Photography
- Philip Scoggins: Recorder
- Recorded and mixed at Creative Workshop
- Additional recording at Moraine Music Group
- Mastered at Foxwood Music
