= Western Beat =

Studio album by Kevin Welch
- Released: April 10, 1992
- Genre: Country
- Length: 39:35
- Label: Reprise
- Producer: Harry Stinson & Kevin Welch

Kevin Welch chronology
Kevin Welch (1990)	Western Beat (1992)	Life Down Here on Earth (1995)

Professional ratings
Review scores
Source	Rating
AllMusic	3/5 stars

Western Beat is the second studio album by Kevin Welch, as Kevin Welch @nd The Overtones, released in 1992 on Reprise Records. This was Welch's last album for Reprise, before he went on to co-found Dead Reckoning Records in 1994 with fellow musicians Kieran Kane, Mike Henderson, Tammy Rogers, and Harry Stinson.

== Critical reception ==
Thom Owens of AllMusic calls Western Beat "a fresh, lively sound, supported by a number of first-rate songs."

Allen Howie of Louisville Music News concludes his review by saying, "Credit must be given to the Overtones, who sound like a real band throughout, not just some amalgam of studio vets. Their music is the heart of Western Beat, and Welch's dead-on writing and singing are its soul."

Daniel Durchholz of RiverFront Times writes, "Maybe it's better if Welch's music is just allowed to speak for itself, which it has on four dazzling albums, starting with his self-titled debut in 1990 and 1992's aforementioned Western Beat."

Geoffrey Himes of the Washington Post wasn't very impressed with Western Beat and writes, "Welch's melodies and rhythms are serviceable in a derivative Nashville sort of way, but his songs sink on the strength of the lyrics."

== Track listing ==
All tracks are written by Kevin Welch, unless otherwise noted.

No.	Title	Writer(s)	Length
1.	"Early Summer Rain"		4:27
2.	"The Other Side"		3:43
3.	"I Look For You"	Kevin Welch; Wally Wilson	3:33
4.	"Happy Ever After (Comes One Day At A Time)"		3:49
5.	"Something 'Bout You"		3:17
6.	"Sam's Town"	Kevin Welch; Gary Nicholson	3:54
7.	"Webelo Waggle"		0:52
8.	"Same Old Rain"		4:32
9.	"Train To Birmingham"	John Hiatt	4:13
10.	"The Restless Kind"	Michael Henderson	3:21
11.	"Me And Billy The Kid Never Got Along"	Joe Ely	3:47
12.	"The End"		0:07
Total length:			39:35

== Musicians ==
- Kevin Welch: Vocals, Guitar, National Steel Guitar
- Mike Henderson: Acoustic & Electric Guitar, Steel Guitar
- David Grissom: Electric Guitar
- Kieran Kane: Mandolin, Vocals
- Biff Watson: Keyboards, Acoustic & Electric Guitar
- Glenn Worf: Bass, String Bass
- Harry Stinson: Drums, Percussion, Vocals
- Ashley Cleveland: Background Vocals
- Kim Fleming: Background Vocals
- Vicki Hampton: Background Vocals

== Production ==
- Harry Stinson: Producer
- Kevin Welch: Producer
- Peter Coleman: Engineer
- Ron Keith: Photography
- Laura LiPuma-Nash: Art Direction

All track information and credits were taken from the album's liner notes.
