= Six Months, No Sun =

Studio album by Kieran Kane
- Released: April 7, 1998
- Genre: Country
- Length: 43:57
- Label: Dead Reckoning Records
- Producer: Kieran Kane, Harry Stinson and Andy White

Kieran Kane chronology
Dead Rekoning (1995)	Six Months, No Sun (1998)	11/12/13: Live in Melbourne (2000)

Professional ratings
Review scores
Source	Rating
Allmusic	3/5 stars
Entertainment Weekly	A−

Six Months, No Sun is the fourth studio album by Kieran Kane. It's the second album on Dead Reckoning Records, which is the label he established in 1994 with musicians Kevin Welch, Mike Henderson, Tammy Rogers, and Harry Stinson. He wrote all the songs in the album apart from two songs, which are his covers of "I Wonder Where You Are Tonight" and "What a Wonderful World".

== Track listing ==
All tracks are written by Kieran Kane, unless otherwise noted.

No.	Title	Writer(s)	Length
1.	"Table Top Dancer"		3:10
2.	"Kill The Demon"		4:12
3.	"(You're Just) Takin' Up Space"		2:47
4.	"In A Town This Size"		3:40
5.	"PhysicalThing"		3:37
6.	"Foolish As That May Be"		4:25
7.	"48 And Goal"		0:50
8.	"What A Wonderful World"	George David Weiss; George Douglas	2:47
9.	"I Wonder Where You Are Tonight"	Johnny Bond	2:40
10.	"Hysteria"		3:29
11.	"Six Months, No Sun"		3:12
12.	"To Whom It May Concern"		4:50
13.	"J'Aime Faire L'Amour"		4:18
Total length:			43:57

== Musicians ==
- Kieran Kane: Vocals, Acoustic Guitar, Backing Vocals, 12-string Guitar
- Andy White: Acoustic Guitar on track 10
- Alison Prestwood: Backing Vocals on tracks 4, Bass on tracks 1, 4, 13
- Robert Bailey: Backing Vocals on track 5
- Jimmy Hall: Backing Vocals on track 5
- Tammy Rogers: backing Vocals on track 1; Mandolin on tracks 3, 5, 10; Viola on track 12; Vocals on tracks 2, 9, 10
- Glenn Worf: Bass on tracks 2, 3, 5, 6, 8, 9, 11, 12
- Rick Cowling: Bass on track 10; Keyboards on track 10
- Liam Omaonlai: Bodhrán on track 10
- Harry Stinson: Drums on tracks 2, 3, 5 to 7, 11, 12; Vocals on tracks 3, 6, 8, 11
- Mike Henderson: Electric Guitar on tracks 2, 3, 6, 7, 11, 12; National Guitar on track 9; Harmonica on tracks 5, 12; Mandolin on track 9; Vocals on tracks 9
- Tammy Rogers: Fiddle on tracks 1, 2, 6 to 9, 11 to 13
- John Jarvis: B3 Organ on tracks 2, 5, 6, 12; Piano on tracks 3, 6, 7, 10
- Andy White: Vocals on track 10

== Production ==
- Kieran Kane: Producer
- Harry Stinson: Producer on tracks 2, 3, 5 to 9, 11, 12
- Andy White: Producer on track 4
- Kieran Kane: Engineer on tracks 1, 4, 13
- Peter Coleman: Engineer on tracks 2, 3, 5 to 9, 11, 12
- Rick Cowling: Engineer on track 10
- Dan Leffler: Assistant Engineer on tracks 2, 3, 5 to 9, 11, 12
- Track information and credits taken from the album's liner notes.
