= Savannah Welch =

American actress, musician (b. 1984)

- Born: Savannah Rose Welch; August 4, 1984 (age 41); Nashville, Tennessee, U.S.
- Occupations: Actress; musician; composer; podcast host
- Instruments: Guitar; Mandolin
- Years active: 2004–present
- Member of: The Trishas
- Website: www.savannahwelch.com

Savannah Rose Welch (born August 4, 1984) is an American actress, musician and podcast host. She is best known for her work in the feature films Boyhood, The Tree of Life, the ABC series The Good Doctor, and the History Channel drama SIX. Welch is also a member of the alt-country band The Trishas.

== Early life and education ==
Welch is the daughter of singer-songwriter Kevin Welch.

She attended UT Austin and studied film for a year, then dropped out to pursue film production and acting.

== Career ==
=== Acting ===
Welch's first significant acting role was in 2005, in the independent film Jumping Off Bridges, directed by Kat Candler. She went on to appear in higher profile projects including drama Boyhood directed by Richard Linklater. She also had a role in The Tree of Life, written and directed by Terrence Malick. She would work with Malick again in 2017's Song to Song.

In 2013, Welch appeared with her band The Trishas in two films. For her role in Billy Bates, The Trishas played her backup band, and contributed to the soundtrack. The Trishas also appeared as a band in Angels Sing.

In 2018, Welch played the role of ex-Marine Dawn who lost her leg in an IED explosion in the second season of the History Channel's drama series SIX. Her character meets Alex Caulder (Kyle Schmid), one of the main characters of the Navy SEAL Team, while undergoing physical therapy. While shooting, Welch marked the one-year anniversary of her real-life accident.

Welch portrayed Barbara Gordon in the third season of the HBO Max series Titans in 2021.

In 2022, she appeared as recurring character Dr. Danica Powell on season six of ABC's medical drama The Good Doctor.

=== Music ===
Although she grew up in a musical family, Welch did not sing publicly until 2005's “Chip Off the Old Block” SIMS Foundation fundraiser hosted by the Braun Brothers (Reckless Kelly, Micky and the Motorcars).

She would not sing publicly again until the 2009 MusicFest in Steamboat Springs, Colorado. A tribute concert to her father, Kevin Welch, brought her together with 3 other independent artists: Liz Foster, Jamie Lin Wilson, and Kelley Mickwee. They would go on the form the alt-country girl group "The Trishas".

=== Podcast ===
Welch began recording her KUT NPR local podcast "Enough About Music" at Austin venue Cactus Cafe. Her first guest was Kevin Russell of Shinyribs. The only rule with her guests is to talk about anything at all, except music.

== Personal life ==
Welch has a son, Charlie (born in 2012).

On November 2, 2016, Welch was at a farmer's market in Wimberley, Texas with her father and 4-year-old son when a vehicle hit her. Doctors determined the impact injury sustained to her right leg was beyond repair, resulting in amputation.

There was an outpouring of support after the accident from both the Austin and music communities. Welch's first public appearance was at the "Eye Love Savannah" benefit November 28, 2016 organized by Austin photographer Todd Wolfson. A “Stand with Savannah” benefit concert was held in Nashville, Tennessee December 13, 2016 with Savannah's father, country music artist Kevin Welch, reuniting with his old band Dead Reckoners. Emmylou Harris also attended. On December 23, 2016, there was a "Standing Beside Savannah" Benefit Auction at the Continental Club in Austin held during the Legends & Legacies Holiday Show, which featured multi-generation family collaborations from Austin musical families performing, including Welch's brother Dustin and father Kevin, James McMurty, John Dee Graham, and Charlie Sexton.

== Filmography ==
Year	Title	Role	Notes
2006	Jumping Off Bridges	Grove Adams	directed by Kat Candler
2008	Clown Hunt	Gerte	directed by Barry Tubb
2008	Cowboy Funeral		
2009	Love, Sadie	Sadie	
2010	The Virginity Hit	Becca	
2010	Ninja James and the Beast Boy	Jane	
2011	The Legend of Hell's Gate: An American Conspiracy	The Priest's Daughter	
2011	The Tree of Life	Mrs. Kimball	directed by Terrence Malick
2011	Casey Jones	April O'Neil	Fan film
2012	Deep in the Heart	Joni	
2012	The Sinner	Angela	
2012	Spring Eddy	Angela	
2013	Angels Sing	The Trishas	acting and soundtrack
2013	Billy Bates	Kaia	
2014	Boyhood	College Girl Singer	directed by Richard Linklater
2014	Missed Connection	Kara	
2015	Jack's Apocalypse	Beth	
2016	The Golden Rut	Magnolia	
2017	Song to Song		directed by Terrence Malick
2018	The Transcendents	Kim	directed by Derek Ahonen
2018	Six	Dawn	season 2, episode 5
2021	Titans	Barbara Gordon	season 3, 8 episodes
2022	The Handmaid's Tale	Sam	season 5, episode 3
2022–2023	The Good Doctor	Dr. Danica "Danni" Powell	Recurring role, Season 6. 8 episodes

== Discography ==
Year	Album	Artist	Credits
2015	I Won't Back Down	Sammy Kershaw	Composer
2015	Various - Friends of Sims (CD, Album)	SIMS Foundation	Backing Vocals
2013	Cheater's Game	Bruce Robison / Kelly Willis	Composer
2013	Trouble	Randy Rogers Band	Composer
2012	High, Wide & Handsome	The Trishas	Composer, Vocals, Guitar
2011	Raise My Glass	Micky & The Motorcars	Composer
2011	This One's for Him: A Tribute to Guy Clark	various	Harmony, Vocals
2010	A Patch of Blue Sky	Kevin Welch	Vocals
2010	Sinners & Saints	Raul Malo	Vocals (Background)
2010	The Only Easy Day Was Yesterday	Raul Malo	Vocals (Background)
2010	They Call Us The Trishas	The Trishas	Composer, Vocals, Guitar
2009	Naive	Micky & The Motorcars	Vocals

== Awards and nominations ==
=== Acting ===
Year	Award	Category	Work	Result	Ref.
2019	North Hollywood Cinefest 2019 Awards	Best Actress in a Feature Film	The Transcendents	Won	

=== Music ===
Year	Album/Category	Artist	Credits	Ref.
2013	Cheater's Game, Bruce Robison & Kelly Willis/Album of the Year	Americana Music Honors Awards	Nominated	
2013	Cheater's Game, Bruce Robison & Kelly Willis/Americana	SESAC Award	Won	
2009	Naive, Micky & the Motorcars/Americana Performance Activity	SESAC Award	Won	
