= Naive (Micky & the Motorcars album) =

Studio album by Micky & the Motorcars
- Released: July 29, 2008
- Genre: Red Dirt, Texas Country
- Label: Smith Entertainment
- Producer: David Abeyta and Cody Braun

Micky & the Motorcars chronology
Careless (2006)	Naive (2008)	Live at Billy Bob's Texas (2009)

Naive is Micky & the Motorcars' fourth album. It was released on July 29, 2008. It was produced by David Abeyta and Cody Braun of Reckless Kelly. Songwriting credits include Willy Braun, Randy Rogers, and Kevin Welch among others.

== Track listing ==
1. "Naive" (Micky Braun, Willy Braun) - 2:50
2. "Amber" (M. Braun, Savannah Welch) - 2:49
3. "Long Enough To Leave" (M. Braun, Randy Rogers) - 4:26
4. "Grow Old" (M. Braun) - 3:10
5. "Don't Be Sad" (M. Braun, W. Braun, Kevin Welch) - 3:13
6. "Misunderstood" (M. Braun, Robert Kearns) - 3:03
7. "Bloodshot" (M. Braun, Dustin Welch, James Harrison) - 3:23
8. "Seashell" (M. Braun, D. Welch) - 2:40
9. "Everything I've Got" (M. Braun, S. Welch, K. Welch) - 3:43
10. "Twilight" (John Dee Graham) - 3:43
11. "Seeds" (M. Braun) - 4:15
12. "Let's Split Out Of Here" (M. Braun, W. Braun) - 3:46

== Personnel ==
- Micky Braun - Lead Vocals, Acoustic Guitar, Electric Rhythm Guitar
- Gary Braun - Electric Guitar, Harmonica, Lead and Harmony Vocals
- Shane Vannerson - Drums, Percussion
- Mark McCoy - Bass Guitar
- Kris Farrow - Lead Guitar, Rickenbacker Mandoblaster
- Bukka Allen - B3 Organ, Piano, Organ
- Michael Ramos - Pump Organ
- Lloyd Maines - Pedal Steel
- Cody Braun - Background Vocals
- David Abeyta - Piano, 12-String Electric Guitar
- Mickey Raphael - Harmonica

== Chart performance ==
Chart (2008)	Peak position
U.S. Billboard Top Country Albums	43
U.S. Billboard Top Heatseekers	27
