= Find My Way Home =

Studio album by Kieran Kane
- Released: October 19, 1993
- Genre: Country
- Length: 32:55
- Label: Atlantic Records
- Producer: Harry Stinson & Kieran Kane

Kieran Kane chronology
Kieran Kane (1982)	Find My Way Home (1993)	Dead Rekoning (1995)

Professional ratings
Review scores
Source	Rating
Allmusic	4.5/5 stars

Find My Way Home is the second album by Kieran Kane and his last one for Atlantic Records before starting his own label, Dead Reckoning Records, with fellow musicians, Kevin Welch, Harry Stinson, Tammy Rogers and Mike Henderson.

== Track listing ==
All tracks are written by Kieran Kane, except "The Room at the Top of the Stairs" written by Randall Hylton.

No.	Title	Length
1.	"I'm Here to Love You"	3:22
2.	"Greener Pastures"	2:58
3.	"I'll Be Turning to You"	2:49
4.	"If You Only Hurt the Ones You Love ( I Must Love You a Lot)"	3:15
5.	"Return to Me"	3:45
6.	"That's What You Do (When You Love Somebody)"	2:27
7.	"Forgive and Forget"	2:48
8.	"Find My Way Home"	4:15
9.	"Maybe Next Time"	3:10
10.	"The Room at the Top of the Stairs"	4:06
Total length:		32:55

== Musicians ==
- Kieran Kane: Lead Vocals, Mandolin, Acoustic Guitar, Bouzouki
- Jay Spell: Accordion on track 3
- Emmylou Harris, Glen Duncan, Harry Stinson: Backing Vocals on tracks 2 and 8
- Harry Stinson: Drums
- Glenn Worf: Electric Bass, Acoustic Bass
- Billy Bremner: Electric Guitar, Acoustic Guitar
- Dan Dugmore: Electric Guitar, Acoustic Guitar, Resonator Guitar, Lap Steel Guitar, Steel Guitar
- Glen Duncan: Fiddle
- Sam Bacco: Percussion on track 10

== Production ==
- Harry Stinson, Kieran Kane: Producers
- Peter Coleman: Engineer
- Jon Lechner: Assistant Engineer
- Wayne Morgan: Assistant Engineer
- Denny Purcell: Mastering
- John Guess: Mixing Engineer
- Marty Williams: Mixing Assistant
- Elizabeth Workman: Design
- June Arnold: Make-Up
- Jerry Joyner: Cover Design, Design
- Ron Keith: Photography
- Track information and credits taken from the album's liner notes.
