= Lost John Dean =

Studio album by Kieran Kane, Kevin Welch & Fats Kaplin
- Released: April 4, 2006
- Recorded: 2005
- Studio: Moraine, Studios
- Genre: Country
- Length: 36:20
- Label: Dead Reckoning Records

Kieran Kane, Kevin Welch & Fats Kaplin chronology
You Can't Save Everybody (2004)	Lost John Dean (2006)	Kane Welch Kaplin (2007)

Professional ratings
Review scores
Source	Rating
Allmusic	3.5/5 stars

Lost John Dean is the second album by the trio, Kieran Kane, Kevin Welch & Fats Kaplin. Hal Horowitz of AllMusic writes "The recording is clean, clear and crisp, with each instrument defined under the vocals making a good album even better."

== Track listing ==
No.	Title	Writer(s)	Length
1.	"Monkey Jump"	Kieran Kane; Sean Locke	3:09
2.	"Satan’s Paradise"	Claudia Scott; Kevin Welch	3:39
3.	"Lost John Dean"	Traditional	3:26
4.	"Heaven Now"	Chris Stapleton; Kevin Welch	3:55
5.	"Postcard From Mexico"	Dave Olney; John Hadley	2:34
6.	"To The Harvest Look Ahead"	Kevin Welch; Dustin Welch	2:56
7.	"I Can’t Wait"	Claudia Scott; Kieran Kane; Sean Locke	3:31
8.	"Mr. Bones"	Claudia Scott, Kevin Welch, David Olney, John Hadley	4:01
9.	"Clean Getaway"	Kevin Welch	2:50
10.	"Them Wheels Don’t Roll"	Kieran Kane; Sean Locke	3:13
11.	"Mellow Down Easy"	Willie Dixon	3:06
Total length:			36:20

== Musicians ==
- Kieran Kane: Vocals, guitar, octave mandolin, banjo, tambourine, drum and drum sounds
- Kevin Welch: Vocals, guitar, assorted groove slaps
- Fats Kaplin: Accordion, button accordion, pedal steel, oud, fiddle, electric guitar, takeoff guitar
- Design: Dave Laing
- Mastered by Philip Scoggins
- Recorded and mixed by Charles Yingling, Philip Scoggins

All track information and credits were taken from the CD liner notes.
