= A Patch of Blue Sky =

Studio album by Kevin Welch
- Released: June 15, 2010
- Venues: Cedar Creek, Austin, TX
- Genre: Country
- Length: 42:35
- Label: Music Road Records

Kevin Welch chronology
Kane Welch Kaplin (with Kieran Kane and Fats Kaplin) (2007)	A Patch of Blue Sky (2010)	The Dead Reckoning Years (2017)

Professional ratings
Review scores
Source	Rating
Allmusic	3.5/5 stars
The Austin Chronicle	4/5 stars

A Patch of Blue Sky is the sixth solo album by Kevin Welch, his first album since Kane Welch Kaplin, the self-titled third album from the band formed with Kieran Kane and Fats Kaplin.

== Critical reception ==
James Allen described A Patch of Blue Sky as "pretty much a ballad album from start to finish" on his AllMusic review.

Jim Caligiuri of The Austin Chronicle writes, "A Patch of Blue Sky feels short at the standard 10 songs, but that's only because its spell, whether somber or filled with promise, is so inviting."

Steve Horowitz of Pop Matters reviews the album and says, "The music and vocals complement each other just like the way a landscape is comprised of dirt below and the heavens above."

Jim Beal, Jr. of My San Antonio writes, "Welch is working with a new CD, “A Patch of Blue Sky” (Music Road Records) his first "solo" record in a while. It includes "Andaman Sea," "Midnight and Noon" and "New Widow's Dream," songs that are serious, to say the least."

Michael Scott Cain of Rambles writes, "The songs on this album are mostly downbeat and won't fit the Nashville song machine that Welch deliberately walked away from several years ago, choosing not to participate in it any more, but that's Nashville's loss. He doesn't write or sing to formula."

Music & Musicians begins their review with, "Ending an eight-year absence, Kevin Welch’s new album shows us all over again why he’s regarded as an Americana icon."

David McGee of The Bluegrass Special includes this statement in his review of the album, "A Patch of Blue Sky is a wondrous thing, marked by impeccable songcraft, beautifully restrained and deeply evocative musicianship, heartfelt singing and meaningful stories."

Brian Baker of Country Standard Time concludes his review with, "The CD proves talent is genetic, with appearances from Welch's son Dustin and daughter Savannah (and her band, The Trishas), but most of all it is pure evidence of the timeless beauty and scuffed wisdom in Kevin Welch's songs."

The San Francisco Examiner reviews the album and writes, "A Patch of Blue Sky" — featuring a now-adult Dustin on banjo and slide, plus daughter Savannahon on vocals — is his first solo set in eight years. But that's not by choice."

Nick Cristiano of The Philadelphia Inquirer writes, "A Patch of Blue Sky unfolds at a deliberate pace. That highlights the contemplative, soul-searching nature of Welch's tersely eloquent song poetry."

== Track listing ==
All tracks are written by Kevin Welch, unless otherwise noted.

No.	Title	Writer(s)	Length
1.	"Come a Rain"		5:08
2.	"The Great Emancipation"		4:30
3.	"Andaman Sea"		3:54
4.	"Marysville"		3:38
5.	"New Widow's Dream"	Kevin Welch; Dustin Welch	3:51
6.	"Midnight And Noon"		4:33
7.	"Long Gone Dream"	Kevin Welch; Martin Hoybye	3:18
8.	"Answer Me That"		3:38
9.	"That's How It Feels"		4:51
10.	"A Patch Of Blue Sky"	Kevin Welch; Claudia Scott	5:14
Total length:			42:35

== Musicians ==
- Kevin Welch: Acoustic Guitar, Electric Guitar, Vocals
- Dustin Welch: Banjo, Resonator Guitar, Backing Vocals
- Glenn Fukunaga: Bass
- Brian Standefer: Cello
- Rick Richards: Drums
- Bukka Allen: Harmonium, Piano, Organ (Wurlitzer), Organ (Hammond B-3)
- Fats Kaplin: Pedal Steel Guitar
- Dustin Welch: Backing Vocals on track 4
- Eliza Gilkyson: Backing Vocals on track 3
- Jackie Johnson: Backing Vocals on track 10
- Jeremy Nail: Backing Vocals on track 2
- Kelley Mickwee: Backing Vocals on track 1
- Preston Shannon: Backing Vocals on track 10
- Sally Allen: Backing Vocals on track 6
- Savannah Welch: Backing Vocals on track 1
  - The Trishas: Backing Vocals on track 10
- The Burns Sisters Band: Backing Vocals on track 10

== Production ==
- Executive Producer: Kelcy Warren
- Photography: Todd V. Wolfson
- Photography: Mathew Sturtevant
- Engineer: Lawrence Mitchell
- Engineer: Fred Remmert
- Engineer: John Silva
- Engineer: Brian Standefer
- Engineer: Kevin Welch

All track information and credits were verified from the album's liner notes.
