= American Blood =

Song by Reckless Kelly

from the album Bulletproof
- Language: English
- Released: June 24, 2008
- Genre: Red Dirt, Roots rock, Alternative country, Americana
- Length: 3:51
- Label: Yep Roc
- Songwriter: Willy Braun

"American Blood" is a song by Texan Red Dirt band Reckless Kelly, for their fifth 2008 studio album, Bulletproof. It is "an anti-war anthem".

== Meaning ==
When writing the song, lead singer Willy Braun "knew some people were not going to like it". He pleads, however, that people understand that "is not an attack on them or their sons and daughters in the military, but an attempt to shed light on the cold hard truth that not everything about this war makes sense". He also comments that "there are some people in Washington making a lot of money on this war at the expense of the 30,000+ American soldiers who have been killed or injured on the frontlines."

== Reception ==
Nick Spitzer, host of the radio program American Routes, said "'American Blood' could be the song that legitimizes critiquing America while loving the country." About the song's meaning, Allmusic notes that "People end up endlessly disappointed and frustrated when encountering the paradox of who their nation says they are and what the nation is in and of itself". On "American Blood", CMT says "Reckless Kelly isn't afraid to speak out, however this may be taken. "American Blood" has such lyrics as 'Johnny can't drink 'cause Johnny ain't 21/But he's 18 and pretty handy with a gun.'"

== Awards ==
"American Blood" received an honorable mention in the "Americana" section of the International Songwriting Competition.
