= Dead Rekoning =

Studio album by Kieran Kane
- Released: April 11, 1995
- Genre: Country
- Length: 35:56
- Label: Dead Reckoning Records
- Producer: Harry Stinson and Kieran Kane

Kieran Kane chronology
| Find My Way Home (1993) | Dead Rekoning (1995) | Six Months, No Sun (1998) |

Professional ratings
Review scores
| Source | Rating |
|---|---|
| Allmusic | 3.0/5 stars |

Dead Rekoning is the third studio album by Kieran Kane. It was released in 1995 on Dead Reckoning Records. The first track, "This Dirty Little Town" features Emmylou Harris and Lucinda Williams.

== Track listing ==
All tracks are written by Kieran Kane, unless otherwise noted.

| No. | Title | Writer(s) | Length |
|---|---|---|---|
| 1. | "This Dirty Little Town" (with Emmylou Harris & Lucinda Williams) | | 2:56 |
| 2. | "He Never Knew What Hit Him" | | 3:23 |
| 3. | "Cool Me Down" | | 4:01 |
| 4. | "Bell Ringing in an Empty Sky" | | 4:15 |
| 5. | "Je Suis Tres Contendre" | | 3:16 |
| 6. | "Ramblin' Man" | Hank Williams | 3:20 |
| 7. | "Eight More Miles" | | 2:45 |
| 8. | "If It's Not Love" | | 3:13 |
| 9. | "Find Somebody New" | | 2:54 |
| 10. | "So Many Miles" | | 3:42 |
| 11. | "Love's Gonna Live Here" | Buck Owens | 2:11 |
| Total length: | | | 35:56 |

- Track information and credits verified from the album's liner notes as well as the Dead Reckoning Records official site.

== Personnel ==
- Kieran Kane (vocals, guitar)
- Emmylou Harris, Somebody's Darling (vocals)
- Dan Dugmore (electric guitar, dobro, steel guitar)
- Mike Henderson (acoustic & electric guitars, National steel guitar, slide guitar)
- Tammy Rogers (mandolin, fiddle, background vocals)
- Fats Kaplin (accordion)
- Roy Huskey, Jr. (acoustic bass)
- Glenn Worf (bass)
- Harry Stinson (drums, background vocals)
- Don Heffington (bass bodhran, Egyptian tambourine, tambourine, triangle, percussion)
- Lucinda Williams (vocals)

== Production ==
- Produced by Harry Stinson & Kieran Kane
- Mastered by Hank Williams at Master Mix, Nashville, Tennessee
- Mixed by Peter Coleman at Treasure Isle, Nashville, Tennessee
- Art direction/Design/Photography by Alan Messer
- Additional background vocals by Kieran Kane at Studio By The Driveway
