= Somewhere in Time =

Somewhere in Time may refer to:

== Media ==
- Bid Time Return, a 1975 science fiction novel by Richard Matheson, retitled Somewhere in Time after the movie release
  - Somewhere in Time (film), a 1980 adaptation of the novel, starring Christopher Reeve and Jane Seymour

=== Music ===
- Somewhere in Time (Iron Maiden album), 1986
- Somewhere in Time, a 2002 album by Donny Osmond
- Somewhere in Time (Reckless Kelly album), 2010
- Somewhere in Time, a 1992 album by Dino Kartsonakis
