= Nobody's Girl =

Nobody's Girl may refer to:

- Nobody's Girl (album), a 2025 album by Amanda Shires
- Nobody's Girl (memoir), the 2025 memoir by Eppstein's sexual abuse survivor Virginia Giuffre
- Nobody's Girl (novel), a 1893 novel by Hector Malot
- "Nobody's Girl" (Michelle Wright song), 1996
- "Nobody's Girl" (Tate McRae song), 2025
- "Nobody's Girl", a 1989 song by Bonnie Raitt from her album Nick of Time
- "Nobody's Girl", a 2003 song by Reckless Kelly from their album Under the Table and Above the Sun
- "Nobody's Girl", a 2005 song by the Bratz Rock Angelz from their album Rock Angelz
- "Nobody's Girl", a 2019 song by Bryan Adams from his album Shine a Light
