= Casey Jones (film) =

- Directed by: Polaris Banks
- Written by: Polaris Banks
- Based on: Characters by Kevin Eastman; Peter Laird
- Produced by: Alex Luprete
- Starring: Hilarion Banks; Robbie Rist; Moira Wilson; Polaris Banks; Savannah Welch; Robert Banks; Brian Villalobos
- Cinematography: Polaris Banks
- Edited by: Polaris Banks
- Music by: Zain Effendi
- Distributed by: Guiding Star Productions
- Release date: August 14, 2011
- Running time: 35 minutes
- Language: English
- Budget: $20,000

Casey Jones, also known as Casey Jones: The Movie, is a short fan film written, filmed, edited and directed by Polaris Banks based on the Teenage Mutant Ninja Turtles character of the same name. The film premiered August 14, 2011 in Austin, Texas at the Marchesa Hall & Theater, and on the internet on September 18, 2011. Robbie Rist reprises his role as Michelangelo from Teenage Mutant Ninja Turtles (1990), Teenage Mutant Ninja Turtles II: The Secret of the Ooze (1991), and Teenage Mutant Ninja Turtles III (1993).

== Plot ==
At an ice hockey rink, Casey's coach berates him again for body checking another player. His cousin Sid calls him a benchwarmer, causing Casey to hit him in the face with his hockey stick out of anger. The coach kicks Casey off of the team. On his way home, Casey tosses away all of his hockey equipment, except for his stick, and spots a boy spray-painting graffiti on his building. Casey chases the boy away and heads to his house to ask his mom if he can stay with her for a while. When she accepts, Casey tries to fix the sink, but he ends up breaking it, causing water damage in the kitchen.

While cleaning the graffiti off of his building, the graffiti boy and his gang, The Purple Dragons, arrive and beat him. Casey crawls back into his house and falls asleep on the kitchen floor after he puts the tooth they knocked out back into his mouth. When he wakes up, his mom berates him for constantly getting into trouble. Casey tells her he got jumped, causing her to say that she has decided to sell the building and head back to Northampton. Casey promises to fix everything.

Over the next week, Casey starts training by lifting weights, jogging, hitting a punching bag, and smashing stuff at the local dump with his hockey stick while April O'Neil does a news report on the Lower East Side, a part of the city ruled by the Purple Dragons and other street gangs. After he finishes training, Casey makes himself a new hockey mask. That night, when Casey spots the Purple Dragons mugging a woman, he viciously attacks them until all of them except one are knocked unconscious. He beats the last one unconscious with a golf club and heads out into the city, where he spots two thugs breaking into a car. He swoops down and beats one of the thugs unconscious and breaks the other's legs, but before he can finish him off, a man in a trench coat takes his baseball bat. Casey takes out another weapon to finish the thug off when the coated man stops him again. Casey attacks the interloper, who is revealed to be a mutant turtle named Michelangelo. The two fight, with Michelangelo gaining the upper hand. Michelangelo ("Mikey") lectures him for brutally beating thugs to death. When Mikey starts to leave, he is attacked by the Foot Clan. Casey and Mikey team up to fight the ninjas, and when one of them scratches his mask, Casey takes out a sledgehammer and uses it to defeat the rest of the ninjas. Casey starts beating the last ninja standing when his mask comes off, revealing him to be Sid. Casey reveals himself to Sid, who tells him that they are only after Mikey, but Casey refuses to leave Mikey behind. Krang and more Foot ninjas arrive and surround Mikey and Casey. Sid knocks Casey unconscious with Casey's own cricket bat. Mikey knocks Sid out and fights Krang and the ninjas off. Mikey takes Casey back to his lair in the sewers, where he is introduced to Leonardo, Raphael, and Donatello. April reports about Casey saving the woman.

Some time later, some goons steal a pizza from a pizza delivery boy and take it to an alley. One of them suggests they move somewhere else because he is scared of running into Casey Jones, but another assures him that Casey is just a myth. Casey shows up in new armor and knocks the goons unconscious. Casey notices the strange toppings on the pizza and takes it back to the sewer lair where he gives it to the turtles. Casey assures the turtles that he went easy on the thugs.

== Cast ==
=== Live actors ===
- Hilarion Banks as Casey Jones
- Moira Wilson as Mrs. Jones
- Brian Villalobos as Dragon Face
- Polaris Banks as Sid Jones, Foot Ninja
- Savannah Welch as April O'Neil
- Chris Frasier and Marty Moreno as Michelangelo
- Michael Schnick as Tagger
- Leya Czopeck as Mugging Victim
- Robert Banks as Coach
- Cruz Thomas as Frankie
- Chad Hamshire as Mohawk Punk
- Russel L. Minton as Vagrant #1
- Ron Weisberg as Vagrant #2
- Andrew Varenhorst as Vagrant #3
- Marty Moreno as Pizza Man
- Matthew Lee Willis as Purple Dragons #1
- Oscar Angulo as Purple Dragons #2
- Josh Burk as Purple Dragons #3
- Marcos Lujan as Purple Dragons #4
- Ronald Reed as Purple Dragons #5
- Cody Hampshire as Purple Dragons #6
- Chris Gilmore as Russo
- Chris Hagarman as Hockey Player #1
- Sean Fourcand as Hockey Player #2
- Karen Aguilar as Skater Punk
- Nicki Cathro as Pink Punk
- Arnitrice Harrison as Girl on Street

=== Voice actors ===
- Robbie Rist as Michelangelo
- Brian Villalobos as Raphael
- Polaris Banks as Donatello
- Chris Frasier as Krang
- Josh Yawn as Leonardo

== Production ==
Originally planned as a 5-minute teaser, the 35-minute film was made for a reported $20,000 and filmed in parts of Austin and Dallas, Texas, as stand-ins for New York City. Banks shot the film over a two-year period while living in Austin, casting his brother as the title character.

== Reception ==
MTV Geek said it "is probably the most spot-on film treatment of the hockey-masked avenger you will ever find. With superior acting, cinematography, and direction, it is more than just another fan film -- but rather something more akin to TMNT as done by Martin Scorsese."
