= Reckless Kelly Was Here =

Live album by Reckless Kelly
- Released: August 8, 2006
- Recorded: March 31, 2006
- Label: Sugar Hill

Reckless Kelly chronology
Wicked Twisted Road (2005)	Reckless Kelly Was Here (2006)	Best of the Sugar Hill Years (2007)

Professional ratings
Review scores
Source	Rating
Allmusic	4.5/5 stars

Reckless Kelly Was Here is a live CD/DVD by Reckless Kelly. It is the band's second live album and the first to include a DVD.

== Track listing ==
=== Disc One ===
1. "Sixgun" - 7:27
2. "Castanets" - 4:46 (Alejandro Escovedo cover)
3. "Motel Cowboy Show" - 6:03
4. "I Still Do" - 3:20
5. "1952 Vincent Black Lightning - 5:30 (Richard Thompson cover)
6. "Seven Nights in Eire" - 3:15
7. "Break My Heart Tonight" - 3:38
8. "Nobody's Girl" - 3:12
9. "Hey Say May/Guacamole" - 6:24
10. "Vancouver" - 4:02

=== Disc Two ===
1. "Wiggles & Ritalin" - 2:47
2. "Wild Western Windblown Band" - 2:55
3. "Baby's Gone Blues" - 4:17
4. "Wicked Twisted Road - 5:14
5. "Crazy Eddie's Last Hurrah" - 7:01
6. "Revolution" - 9:57 (The Beatles cover)
7. "Break My Heart Tonight" [Studio Version] - 3:43
8. "Wiggles & Ritalin" [Studio Version] - 2:47

=== DVD ===
1. "Sixgun"
2. "Castanets"
3. "Motel Cowboy Show"
4. "I Still Do"
5. "1952 Vincent Black Lightning"
6. "Seven Nights in Eire"
7. "Break My Heart Tonight"
8. "Nobody's Girl"
9. "Hey Say May/Guacamole"
10. "Vancouver"
11. "Wiggles & Ritalin"
12. "Wild Western Windblown Band"
13. "Baby's Gone Blues"
14. "Wicked Twisted Road"
15. "Crazy Eddie's Last Hurrah"

== Radio Singles ==
- "Break My Heart Tonight"— peaked at #6 on the Texas Music Chart

== Chart positions ==
Chart	Peak position
Top Country Albums	56
Top Heatseekers	41
Top Independent Albums	38
