= Wicked Twisted Road =

Studio album by Reckless Kelly
- Released: February 8, 2005
- Recorded: Jun–Oct 2004
- Label: Sugar Hill

Reckless Kelly chronology
Under the Table & Above the Sun (2003)	Wicked Twisted Road (2005)	Reckless Kelly Was Here (2006)

Professional ratings
Review scores
Source	Rating
Allmusic	4/5 stars

Wicked Twisted Road is the fourth studio album by Red Dirt artist Reckless Kelly. It was released on February 8, 2005.

== Track listing ==
All songs written by Willy Braun, except where noted

1. "Wicked Twisted Road" - 3:25
2. "Dogtown" - 3:35 (Willy & Micky Braun)
3. "Seven Nights in Eire" (Bennett, Braun, Braun) - 3:17
4. "A Lot to Ask" - 2:45
5. "Motel Cowboy Show" (Abeyta, Braun, Braun) 5:37
6. "These Tears" - 2:43
7. "Sixgun" - 6:05
8. "Nobody Haunts Me Like You" (Braun, Kennedy) - 3:29
9. "Wretched Again" (Abeyta, Braun, Kennedy) - 3:19
10. "Broken Heart" - 3:11
11. "Stick Around" - 3:59
12. "Baby's Got a Whole Lot More" - 2:45
13. "Wicked Twisted Road" (Reprise) - 6:10

== Radio singles ==
- "Baby's Got a Whole Lot More"— peaked at #6 on the Texas Music Chart
- "Stick Around"— peaked at #5 on the Texas Music Chart
- "These Tears"— peaked at #6 on the Texas Music Chart

== Chart positions ==
Chart	Peak position
Top Country Albums	66
