= Kevin Welch (album) =

Studio album by Kevin Welch
- Released: April 24, 1990
- Recorded: 1988–89
- Genre: Country
- Length: 39:14
- Label: Reprise Records
- Producer: Paul Worley & Ed Seay

Kevin Welch chronology
Kevin Welch (1990)	Western Beat (1992)

Professional ratings
Review scores
Source	Rating
Allmusic	4.5/5 stars

Kevin Welch is the debut album by Kevin Welch, one of the cofounders of the Dead Reckoning Records label. This album is one of two albums Kevin made while he was signed with Reprise Records.

== Track listing ==
No.	Title	Writer(s)	Length
1.	"True Love Never Dies"	Kevin Welch; Gary Scruggs	3:23
2.	"Praying For Rain"	Don Cook; Chris Waters	3:09
3.	"Hello, I'm Gone"	Kevin Welch	3:32
4.	"Till I See You Again"	Kevin Welch	2:43
5.	"Some Kind Of Paradise"	Kevin Welch	5:25
6.	"The Mother Road"	Kevin Welch; Alan Rhody	4:21
7.	"Long Way Home"	Kevin Welch; Gary Nicholson	3:57
8.	"I Am No Drifter"	Kevin Welch; Gary Nicholson	2:48
9.	"I'd Be Missing You"	Kevin Welch; John Hadley	3:06
10.	"I Came Straight To You"	Kevin Welch; John Jarvis	2:47
11.	"A Letter To Dustin"	Kevin Welch	4:03
Total length:			39:14

== Musicians ==
- Kevin Welch: Vocals, guitar
- Michael Henderson: Guitar
- Biff Watson: Keyboards, guitar
- Glen Worf: Bass
- Harry Stinson: Drums

== Production ==
- Paul Worley & Ed Seay: Producers
- Sharon Eaves: Production assistant
- Doug Grau: A&R Direction
- Ed Seay: Recording & Mixing
- Denny Purcell: Mastering
- Peter Nash: Photography
- Laura Lipuma: Art direction, Design

All track information and credits were taken from the CD liner notes.
