= Derek Ahonen =

American dramatist

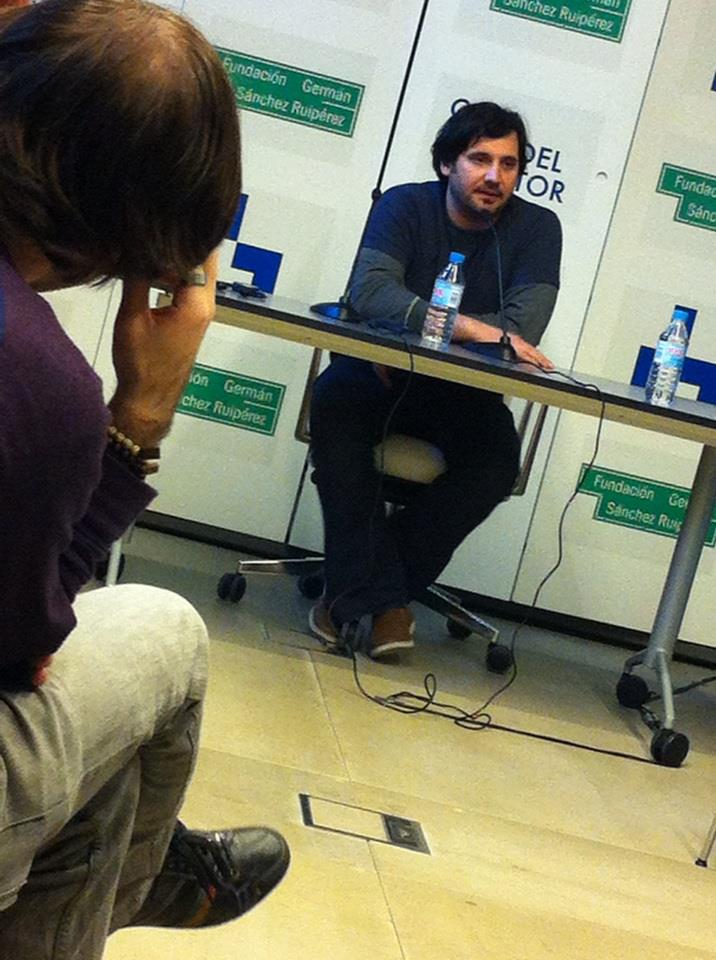
- Ahonen lecturing in Madrid
- Born: Chicago, Illinois
- Occupations: Playwright, Director, Filmmaker, Producer
- Writing career
- Years active: 2007–present
- Genre: Absurdism

Derek Ahonen is an American playwright, director, producer, and filmmaker. He is a co-founder of The Amoralists Theatre Company in NYC. Ahonen is most known for his plays The Pied Pipers of The Lower East Side, Happy In The Poorhouse, The Bad And The Better, and The Qualification of Douglas Evans which have had numerous runs in New York and have been translated, adapted, and performed across three different continents. His plays are published by Concord Theatricals.

== Early life ==
The son of Anna, a Children's Theatre Director, Ahonen was born in Chicago, Illinois. Having grown up around the theatre, Ahonen began performing in his mother's plays from a young age. After graduating from Waubonsie Valley High School, Ahonen moved to New York City to continue his education at the American Academy of Dramatic Arts. Ahonen married in 2019 and stated he lived for a time at a Congregational Church.

== Career with The Amoralists ==
In 2006, Ahonen, along with actors James Kautz and Matthew Pilieci, formed The Amoralists in New York City. The company was founded with the mission to "produce work of no moral judgment," and is "dedicated to an honest expression of the American condition..explor[ing] complex characters of moral ambiguity..." The Amoralists first gained attention in 2009 with Ahonen's cult hit The Pied Pipers of the Lower East Side, which Time Out (magazine) called “the happiest surprise of the season.” The New Yorker noted "the young company's deep commitment and contagious exuberance brings to mind the vitality that distinguished the early off-broadway work of artists like Sam Shepard." The Pied Pipers of the Lower East Side has been revived by the company numerous times. In the spring of 2013 it opened at Madrid's Teatro Espanol under the title Los Iluminados, directed by Julián Fuentes Reta, where it had an extended run along with subsequent tours throughout Spain. Ahonen followed up The Pied Pipers of the Lower East Side with Happy in the Poorhouse, which The New York Times wrote "has a knockabout physicality that grabs your attention. But what holds it is the working-class poetry of Derek Ahonen's script. Mr. Ahonen, who also directs, brings the populist instincts of a born entertainer. As in a performance by the vintage Brando, the tough-guy swagger of his production masks an achingly sentimental heart. He might be a contender yet."

The majority of Ahonen's plays feature ensemble casts and characters living on the outskirts of society. Working-class people and blue color sentiment color most of his writings. His plays are often about the journey the characters are willing to take on their way to nowhere. His plays are plot-driven family melodramas about delusions and affairs of the heart, tragedies played at such a fever pitch that they spill into farce. In an interview with T. Nikki Cesare for TDR (journal), Cesare writes "Ahonen himself could be a character in one of his plays. Compared repeatedly in mainstream reviews to a young Sam Shepard, Ahonen is ribald and charismatic, idiosyncratic and easy with the rough edges." In the same interview Ahonen says, "We (The Amoralists) like to say our plays are comedies full of tears and ideas. We set out for instant pudding, then we hope it has some intellectual substance-without being pretentious. We hope people care enough about the characters to go with them on their journeys, emotionally. When they leave the theatre, they're still thinking about whether they like the character or not." Ahonen goes on to say, "I don't like stuff that thinks it's better than me. I really do consider a work I see for weeks after before I decide whether I like it or not. The biggest turn off for me is theater that isn't welcoming, that's cold and trying to teach me something through its distance. I like work that brings me closer to an artists ideas. And that's what I've dedicated my career to accomplishing. "

== Amoralists Works ==
- While Chasing the Fantastic (2007) The Kraine Theater
- The Pied Pipers of the Lower East Side (2007) Performance Space New York
- Pokin the Bears in a Zoo (2008) Gene Frankel Theatre
- Bring us the Head of Your Daughter (2008) Performance Space New York
- Amerissiah (2008) Performance Space New York
- Happy in the Poorhouse (2010) Performance Space New York
- Pink Knees on Pale Skin (2011) The Gershwin Hotel
- The Bad and the Better (2012) Playwrights Horizons
- The Cheater's Club (2013) Abrons Arts Center
- The Qualification of Douglas Evans (2014) Soho Rep

== Post Amoralists Theatre ==
In the fall of 2014 Ahonen and The Amoralists parted ways over lifestyle differences. In April 2015, Ahonen directed the Los Angeles premiere of The Pied Pipers of The Lower East Side at The Matrix Theatre Company to great critical acclaim. The production contained a completely new cast from previous New York incarnations. He was then commissioned to write his first post-Amoralists play, The Transcendents, by The Village Rep in Charleston, South Carolina. The play ran in the summer of 2015 and was well received with The Charleston City Paper describing it as a "captivating, disturbing, and surprisingly uplifting play" April 2017 brought the Spanish musical adaptation of Ahonen's The Bad and The Better to Madrid's TAI under the title, Los Malos Y Los Mejores. In the summer of 2017 Ahonen collaborated with actress Sarah Roy on his one-woman show, Catherine And Anita. The play opened at Edinburgh Festival Fringe to great acclaim. The Stage called the play "Slick, Sick, and Unsettling" The Ed Fringe Review called it "A powerful show with an important message" Voice Magazine says "This is an amazing piece of theatre." Catherine and Anita later transferred to King's Head Theatre of London in February 2018.

== The Transcendents (Film) ==
In April 2018, Ahonen made his feature film directorial debut of his screenplay, The Transcendents. It was shot entirely on 16mm kodak and Fujifilm in Austin, Texas. It premiered at 20th Annual Sarasota Film Festival on April 18. The film stars Savannah Welch, Kathy Valentine of The Go-Go's, William Leroy, Rob Franco, Ben Reno, Cecilia Deacon, and Paul Sevigny. The Transcendents made its international premiere at The Madrid International Film Festival on July 22, 2018.

The film centers around a Rasputin-like drifter in search of a mysterious band. It was lauded as an "amazing directorial debut" and "possessing some of the most stunning performances you'll ever see." The surreal film was labeled as "Lynch-ian", "Bergman-esque" and "nearly impossible to categorize"

After a year on the festival circuit, it was released theatrically and on VOD on June 19, 2020. The film is distributed by Lionsgate.
