= Bulletproof (Reckless Kelly album) =

Studio album by Reckless Kelly
- Released: June 24, 2008
- Recorded: Jan–Feb 2008
- Length: 49:14
- Label: Yep Roc Records

Reckless Kelly chronology
Best of the Sugar Hill Years (2007)	Bulletproof (2008)	Somewhere in Time (2010)

Professional ratings
Review scores
Source	Rating
Allmusic	4/5 stars

Bulletproof is the fifth studio album by the band Reckless Kelly. It was released on June 24, 2008. The album features tracks critical of and reflecting on recent sociopolitical unfoldings, such as the Iraq War and Hurricane Katrina.

== Track listing ==
No.	Title	Length
1.	"Ragged as the Road"	3:32
2.	"You Don't Have to Stay Forever"	4:04
3.	"Love in Her Eyes"	3:35
4.	"Passin' Through"	3:11
5.	"I Never Had a Chance"	3:05
6.	"One False Move"	3:54
7.	"A Guy Like Me"	3:02
8.	"American Blood"	3:51
9.	"How Was California?"	2:55
10.	"Mirage"	4:00
11.	"Don't Say Goodbye"	3:11
12.	"God Forsaken Town"	4:12
13.	"Wandering Eye"	3:06
14.	"Bulletproof"	3:29
Total length:		49:14

== Radio Singles ==
- "Ragged as the Road"
- "Love in Her Eyes"

== Personnel ==
- David Abeyta – acoustic guitar, percussion, electric guitar, editing, lap steel guitar
- James Bailey – publicity
- Cody Braun – fiddle, harmonica, mandolin, harmony vocals
- Willy Braun – acoustic guitar, percussion, electric guitar, harmony vocals
- Jim DeMain – mastering
- Bobby Huber – studio assistant
- Manfred Jerome – clapping
- Lloyd Maines – pedal steel
- Jimmy McFeeley – bass
- Jay Nazz – drums
- Adam Odor – editing, mixing
- Ephraim Owens - trumpet
- Michael Ramos – piano, organ (hammond), organ (pump), wurlitzer
- Fred Remmert – engineer
- John Smerek – engineer, mixing
- Brian Standefer – cello

== Chart positions ==
Chart	Peak position
Top Country Albums	22
Billboard 200	117
Top Heatseekers	2
Top Independent Albums	14
