= Acoustic: Live at Stubb's =

Live album by Reckless Kelly
- Released: June 6, 2000
- Genre: Country
- Label: Valley Entertainment

Reckless Kelly chronology
Millican (1998)	Acoustic: Live at Stubb's (2000)	The Day (2000)

Professional ratings
Review scores
Source	Rating
Allmusic	4/5 stars

Acoustic: Live at Stubb's is Reckless Kelly's first live album. It was recorded at Stubb's Bar-B-Q in Austin, Texas. The album features a cover of Bob Dylan's Subterranean Homesick Blues, which was originally recorded on his 1965 album, Bringing It All Back Home. Also covered are AC/DC's You Shook Me All Night Long and Led Zeppelin's Whole Lotta Love.

== Track listing ==
1. "My Soul Ain't Sold" (Villanueva, Braun) – 4:10
2. "Hottest Thing in Town" (Shaver) – 8:15
3. "Don't Come Back" – 2:48
4. "Subterranean Homesick Blues" (Bob Dylan) – 2:44
5. "Wild Western Windblown Band" (Hauser) – 3:01
6. "She Sang the Red River Valley" (Bennett) – 4:20
7. "Shook Me All Night Long" (Young, Johnson, Young) – 5:45
8. "You Should Be Gone" (Willy Braun) – 3:33
9. "My Baby Worships Me" (Steve Earle) – 3:22
10. "The Ballad of Tommy and Marla" (Poltz) – 4:11
11. "Strung Out and Wound" (Schelske, Braun) – 3:22
12. "Eight More Miles" (Braun) – 4:19
13. "Whole Lotta Love" (John Bonham, Willie Dixon, John Paul Jones, Jimmy Page, Robert Plant) – 16:40
14. "Lovin' You" (Hidden Track)

== Personnel ==
- Willy Braun – Lead Vocals, guitar
- Cody Braun – Vocals, fiddle, mandolin, harmonica
- Casey Pollack lead guitar
- Jay Nazz (Nazziola) – drums
- Chris Schelske – bass
