= Robbie Rist =

American actor (born 1964)

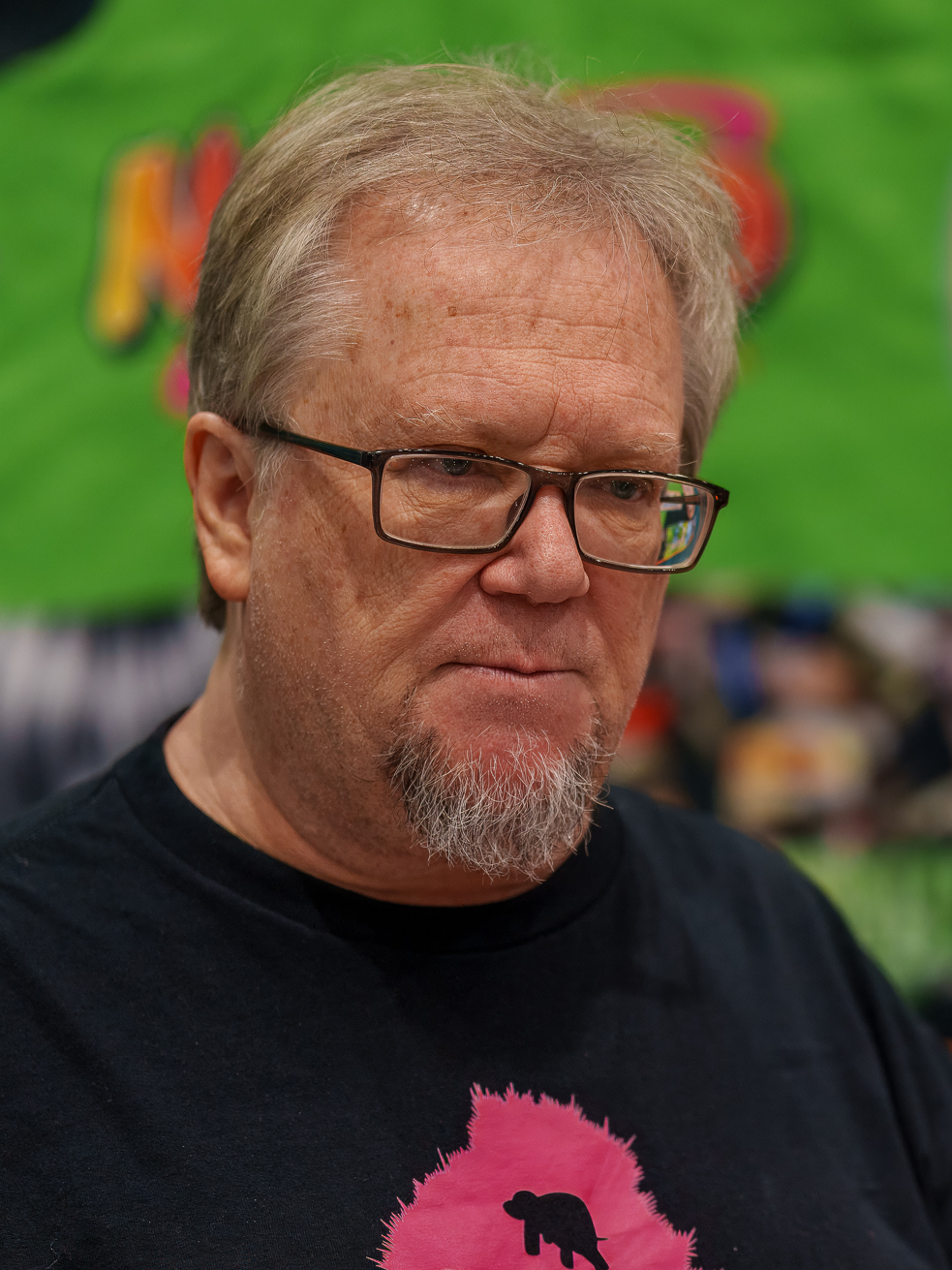
- Rist in 2025 at Galaxy Con Raleigh
- Born: Robert Anthony Rist; April 4, 1964 (age 62); La Mirada, California, U.S.
- Occupation: Actor
- Years active: 1972–present
- Known for: Voicing Michaelangelo in Teenage Mutant Ninja Turtles, Teenage Mutant Ninja Turtles II: The Secret of the Ooze, Teenage Mutant Ninja Turtles III

Robert Anthony Rist (born April 4, 1964) is an American actor. He is known for playing Cousin Oliver in The Brady Bunch, Martin in Grady and "Little John" in Big John, Little John. Rist is also known for voicing assorted characters in television shows, games and movies, most notably as the voice of Michelangelo in the films Teenage Mutant Ninja Turtles (1990), Teenage Mutant Ninja Turtles II: The Secret of the Ooze (1991), Teenage Mutant Ninja Turtles III (1993), and Casey Jones (2011); his other voice roles include Stuffy in Doc McStuffins, Whiz in Kidd Video, Star in Balto, Maroda in Final Fantasy X, and Choji Akimichi in Naruto. Additionally, he and director Anthony C. Ferrante provided music for the Sharknado film and the theme song for the Sharknado franchise. He played Ted and Georgette Baxter's adopted son David on The Mary Tyler Moore Show. He was also the voice of the stick man from the Handi Snacks commercials.

== Early life ==
Rist was born in La Mirada, California on April 4, 1964.

== Career ==
=== Acting ===
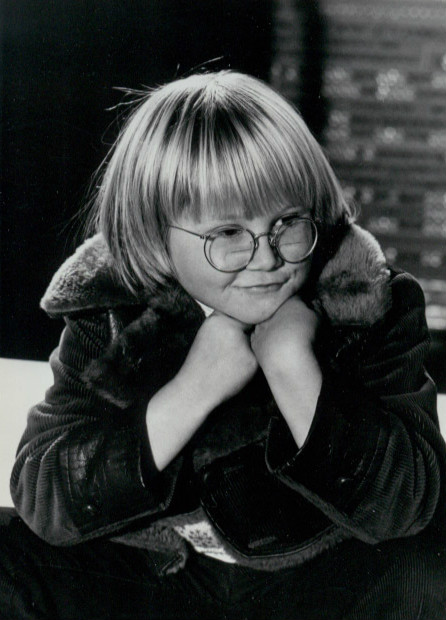
Rist as Cousin Oliver in The Brady Bunch in 1974

As a child, Rist played Cousin Oliver in the final six episodes of The Brady Bunch. With the regular children all growing older, his inclusion was intended to reintroduce a cute, younger child to the series. However, the idea backfired as most viewers disliked the Oliver character and the plan became moot as ABC had opted to not renew the series even before his debut. This gave rise to the TV term "Cousin Oliver Syndrome".

After The Brady Bunch, he appeared as Glendon Farrell in Lucas Tanner starring David Hartman, "Little John" in the Saturday Morning series Big John, Little John, Tommy in the series premiere for the short-lived CBS drama series Bronk, and Martin in the short-lived Sanford and Son spin-off Grady. During 1975–77, Rist played David, son of Ted Baxter (Ted Knight) on The Mary Tyler Moore Show. He also appeared in three episodes of The Bionic Woman. In 1980, Rist played "Dr. Zee" in the first three episodes of Galactica 1980. He made four guest appearances on CHiPs and the short-lived CBS series Whiz Kids, and also played "Booger" in a failed Revenge of the Nerds TV pilot. In 1986, Rist had a supporting role as Milo in the action film, Iron Eagle, which was a box-office hit despite being critically panned.

As of 2006, Rist was acting, working with music and also working in film production. Rist produced a horror/comedy film, Stump The Band, directed by William Holmes and JoJo Hendrickson.

In 2013, he portrayed Robbie the Bus Driver in the camp horror film Sharknado. Rist said in an interview that his friend Anthony C. Ferrante came upon the film's poster at the American Film Market and became enthusiastic about the concept. When Ferrante said that he had been approached to direct the film, Rist insisted that Ferrante take the job, and that if he did, that he should have a part in it. He also mentioned that Sharknado was his very first red carpet premiere.

=== Voice-over work ===
As an adult, Rist has worked as a voice actor, such as in the Teenage Mutant Ninja Turtles film series (as the voice of Michaelangelo); from 1984 to 1986, he starred in the Saturday morning cartoon Kidd Video, playing the character Whiz both in live-action music videos and animated sequences. He was the voice of Star, a mauve-and-cream Siberian Husky, in the animated 1995 Universal Studios film Balto, and to date, this is his first and only role in a full-length animated film. He was also the voice of Aaron in the PC game Star Warped. An episode of Batman: The Animated Series titled "Baby Doll" contained a character called Cousin Spunky that was intended to boost sagging ratings of the fictional sitcom Love That Baby, a clear reference to Cousin Oliver (Rist lent his voice to the episode, but did not play Cousin Spunky; his character was an adult).

Rist also voices characters Choji Akimichi from Naruto, and Bud Bison from Mega Man Star Force.

Rist was the voice of Stuffy, Doc's overly proud stuffed dragon, in Disney Junior's hit animated series Doc McStuffins.

In 2009, he voiced Griffin in Terminator Salvation. He also provided additional voices in Final Fantasy XIII, as well as reprising his role as Michelangelo in a fan-made movie about Casey Jones.

Rist voiced the reincarnation of Mondo Gecko in TMNT 2012.

In 2014, he appeared as the voice of an alien in the James Rolfe film Angry Video Game Nerd: The Movie.

=== Music ===
Rist is also a musician and producer; he sings, plays guitar, bass guitar and drums. Rist has worked with many Los Angeles rock bands, including Wonderboy, The Andersons, Cockeyed Ghost, Nice Guy Eddie, and Steve Barton and the Oblivion Click. The list of west coast pop bands Rist has performed with numbers in the hundreds. He divides his time between film and music production, performing with Los Angeles alt-country band KingsizeMaybe and rock band Jeff Caudill & The Goodtimes Band (with Jeff Caudill of Orange County punk band Gameface and Michael "Popeye" Vogelsang of Orange County punk band Farside). Rist has also produced a number of records for bands, including Suzy & Los Quattro, Backline, Ginger Britt and the Mighty, Jeff Caudill, Steve Barton and the Oblivion Click, Nice Guy Eddie, Kingsizemaybe and The Mockers. Rist produced the album Automatic Toaster for The Rubinoos and played drums on that album. He currently is the drummer for the rock formation Your Favorite Trainwreck.

Rist and director Anthony C. Ferrante provided the music for the Sharknado film, initially writing about six songs for the first film. Rist and Ferrante would provide music for the sequel Sharknado 2 as the band Quint, and perform its theme song "(The Ballad of) Sharknado", which had originally appeared in the first film but few in the initial audience noticed it. Quint was named after the character in Jaws and served as their band's name for future work on the franchise, including the song "Crash" in Sharknado 3. They also released an EP called Great White Skies with several of the theme song's variants.

Rist and Don Frankel's power-pop group Sundial Symphony recorded two of Paul Levinson's songs -- "Merri Goes Round" and "Looking for Sunsets (In the Early Morning)" -- which were released by Big Stir Records in 2019.

=== Advertising ===
In October 2016 and April 2019, Rist promoted The Brady Bunch television series on the MeTV television network.

== Filmography ==
=== Animation ===
- Balto – Star
- Batman: The Animated Series – Brian Daly
- Doc McStuffins – Stuffy
- Godzilla: The Series – Kevin
- Kidd Video – Whiz
- Mighty Magiswords – Frankie Jupiter
- Monster Farm – Jack Haylee
- Sonic Boom – Additional voices, Swifty the Shrew
- Teenage Mutant Ninja Turtles – Mondo Gecko
- The Adventures of Puss in Boots – Lamarr, Angry Villager
- The Weekenders – Thomson Oberman, various
- The Electric Piper – Mick Dixon
- Transformers: Robots in Disguise – Swelter, Tricerashot
- Boruto: Naruto Next Generations – Choji Akimichi (English dub)
- Mega Man Star Force &ndash Bud Bison (English dub)
- Naruto – Choji Akimichi (English dub)
- Naruto: Shippuden – Choji Akimichi (English dub)
- The Last: Naruto the Movie – Choji Akimichi (English dub)

=== Live action ===
- Blending Christmas – Sheldon
- Little Lulu – Iggy
- The Big Hex of Little Lulu – Iggy
- Angry Video Game Nerd: The Movie – Alien
- Big John, Little John – Little John
- Casey Jones – Michaelangelo
- Galactica 1980 – Dr. Zee
- Grady – Martin
- Iron Eagle – Milo
- Lucas Tanner – Glendon Farrell
- Petrocelli – Ray
- Sharknado– Robbie the Bus Driver
- Teenage Mutant Ninja Turtles – Michelangelo
- Teenage Mutant Ninja Turtles II: The Secret of the Ooze – Michelangelo
- Teenage Mutant Ninja Turtles III – Michelangelo
- The Brady Bunch – Cousin Oliver
- Bronk – Tommy
- The Bionic Woman – Andrew
- The Mary Tyler Moore Show – David Baxter
- Unseen Evil – Bob
- The Ransom of Red Chief -- by O. Henry -- Short Story Film -- 1975 – Johnny Dorset

=== Video games ===
- Final Fantasy X – Maroda (English dub)
- Final Fantasy X-2 – Maroda (English dub)
- Final Fantasy XIII – Cocoon Inhabitants
- Mega Man Star Force Legacy Collection &ndash Bud Bison (English dub)
- Middle-earth: Shadow of War – orc captains
- Naruto series – Choji Akimichi (Ultimate Ninja series from Heroes to Storm)
- Sonic Racing: CrossWorlds – Zazz
- Star Warped – Aaron
- Terminator Salvation – Griffin
