= Micky & the Motorcars =

American band

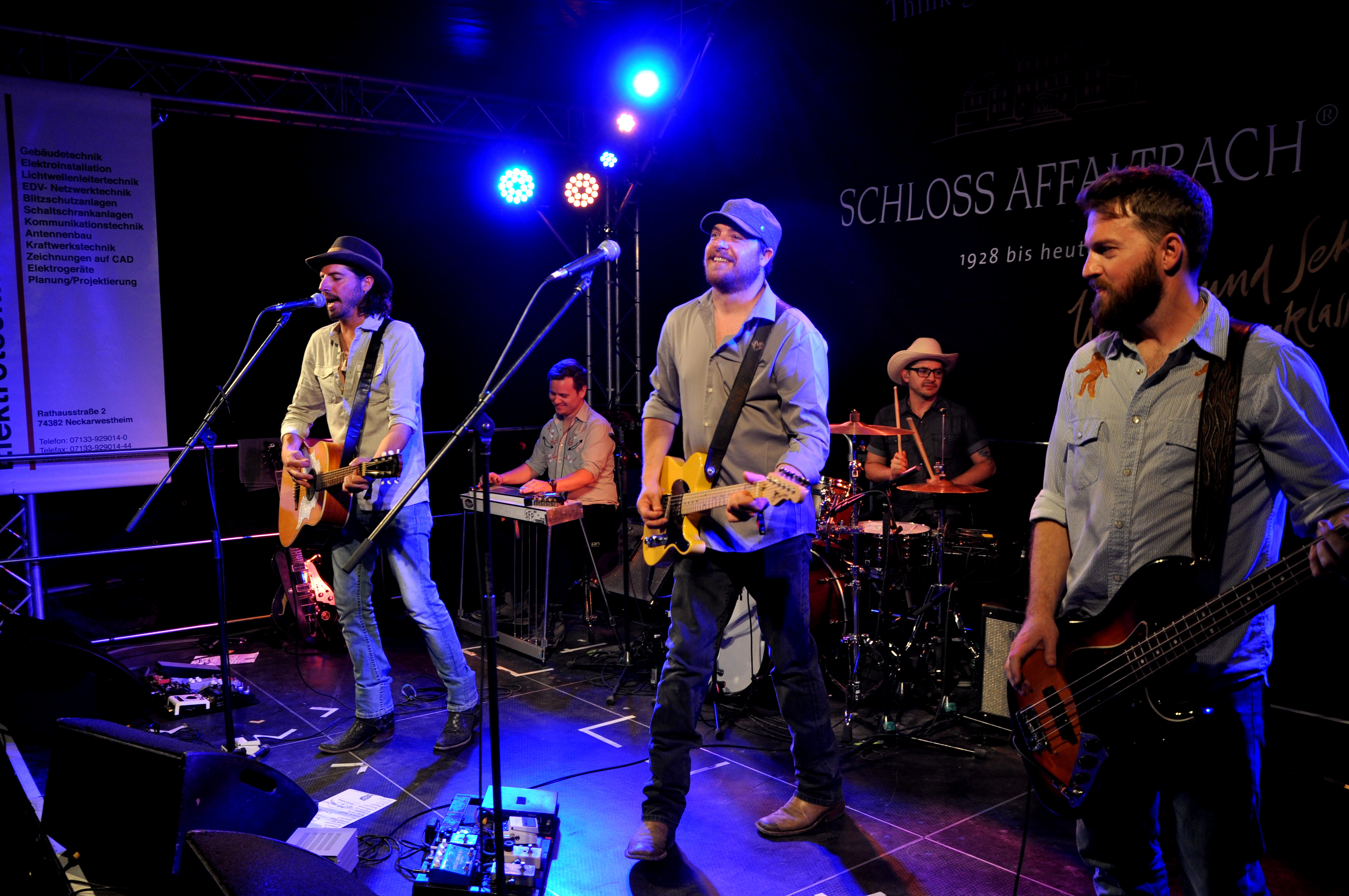
- Micky & the Motorcars at the 2017 Blacksheep Festival

Background information
- Origin: Challis, Idaho, United States
- Genres: Alternative country, Americana, Texas country, roots rock, country rock
- Years active: 2002–present
- Labels: Smith Music Group, Thirty Tigers
- Members: Micky Braun; Gary Braun; Bobby Paugh; Pablo Trujillo; Bill Corbin
- Past members: Mark McCoy (2001–2011); Travis Hardy (2001–2003); Ken Smith (2001–2002); Joseph Deeb (2002–2007); Kris Farrow (2007-2011); Shane Vannerson (2004–2013); Dustin Schaefer (2011–2016); Joe Fladger (2011-2021)
- Website: mickyandthemotorcars.com

Micky & the Motorcars is a red dirt band formed in Stanley, Idaho, now based in Austin, Texas. They have released nine albums, including two live albums.

== Background ==
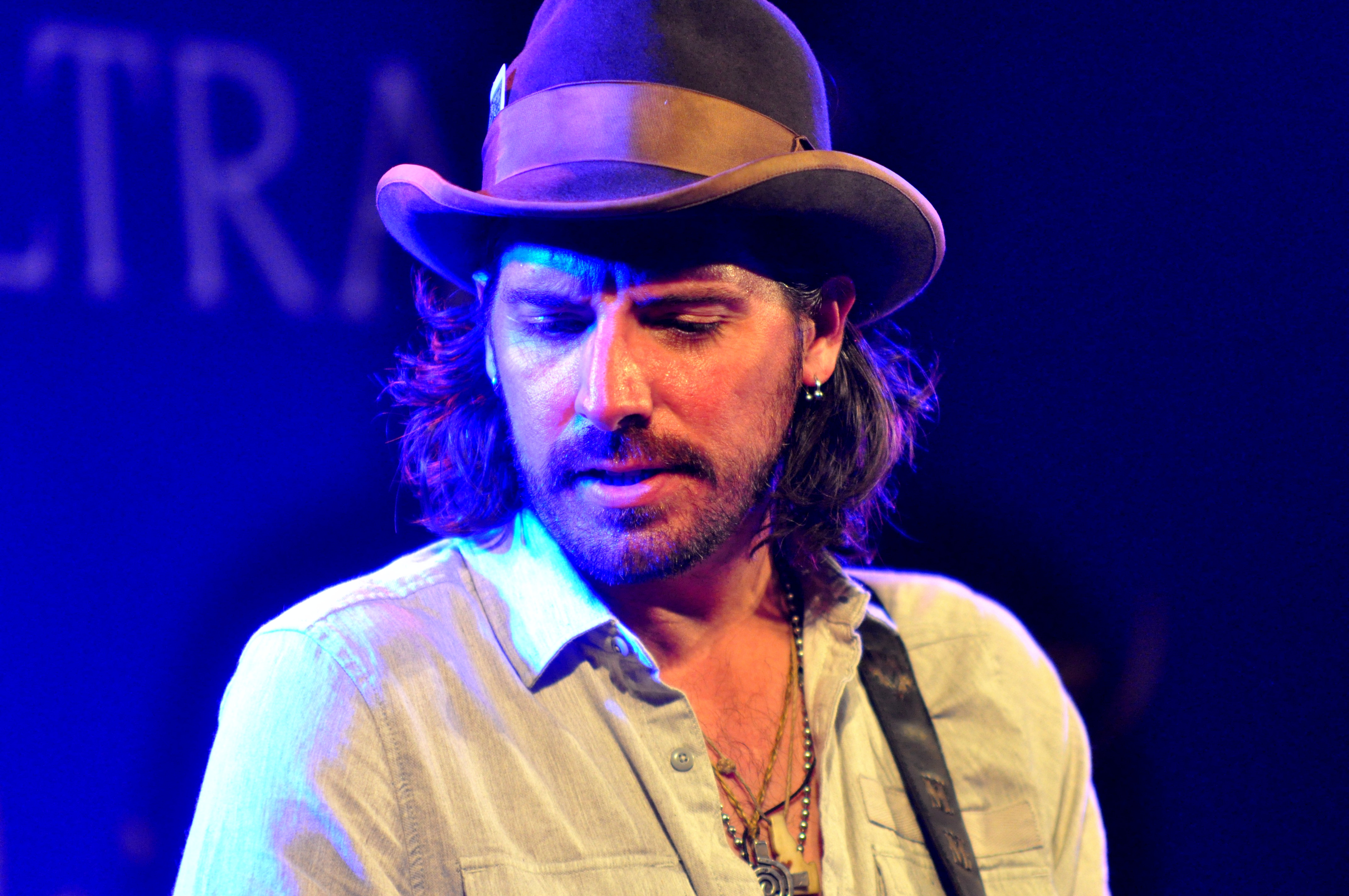
Micky Braun 2017

The two founding members, Micky and Gary Braun, are the sons of outlaw country and western swing musician Muzzie Braun of Stanley, Idaho, and the brothers of Cody Braun and Willy Braun of the Texas-based roots rock band Reckless Kelly. Both were part of Muzzie Braun & the Little Braun Brothers band, but formed their own band after Cody and Willy left to form Reckless Kelly.

The band originated in Idaho. The other founding members were childhood friends Travis Hardy on drums and Mark McCoy on bass. They moved to Austin, Texas, where Joseph Deeb joined the band as their lead guitarist. The band has undergone a number of personnel changes since its founding. Mark McCoy left the band in 2011 and died in 2012 in a rafting accident.

The band currently consists of Micky Braun (acoustic guitar, lead vocals), Gary Braun (lead & harmony vocals, guitars, mandolin, harmonica), Pablo Trujillo (lead guitar, pedal steel), Bill Corbin (bass), and Bobby Paugh (drums & percussion).

The band is also tied to the Texas music movement and, to a lesser extent, the Oklahoma-based Red Dirt music scene. Every year, the band, in conjunction with their brothers and fellow musicians in Reckless Kelly, host the Braun Brothers Reunion in Idaho to celebrate the music and different artists from the genre.

== Discography ==
=== Albums ===
Title	Album details	Peak chart positions			
Title	Album details	US Country	US	US Heat	US Indie
Which Way from Here	Release date: 2002; Label: self-released	—	—	—	—
Ain't in It for the Money	Release date: October 26, 2004; Label: self-released	—	—	—	—
Careless	Release date: February 6, 2007; Label: Smith Music Group	—	—	—	—
Naive	Release date: July 29, 2008; Label: Smith Music Group	43	—	27	—
Live at Billy Bob's Texas	Release date: November 10, 2009; Label: Smith Music Group	72	—	—	—
Raise My Glass	Release date: August 9, 2011; Label: Smith Music Group	36	—	4	38
Hearts from Above	Release date: August 5, 2014; Label: self-released	17	150	3	21
Across the Pond (Live from Germany)	Release date: August 7, 2015; Label: Micky and The Motorcars	—	—	—	—
Long Time Comin'	Release date: November 1, 2019; Label: Thirty Tigers	—	—	—	—
"—" denotes releases that did not chart

=== Music videos ===
Year	Video	Director
2015	"Long Road to Nowhere"	Tony Gates
