= Under the Table and Above the Sun =

Under the Table & Above the Sun

Studio album by Reckless Kelly
- Released: May 13, 2003
- Label: Sugar Hill Records

Reckless Kelly chronology
The Day (2000)	Under the Table & Above the Sun (2003)	Wicked Twisted Road (2005)

Professional ratings
Review scores
Source	Rating
Allmusic	4/5 stars

Under the Table & Above the Sun is the third studio album by Red Dirt artist Reckless Kelly, and their second with Sugar Hill Records.

== Track listing ==
1. "Let's Just Fall" - 2:57
2. "Nobody's Girl" - 3:02
3. "Desolation Angels" - 5:11
4. "Everybody" - 4:13
5. "I Saw It Coming" - 3:12
6. "Vancouver" - 3:54
7. "Willamina" - 4:02
8. "Mersey Beat" - 3:41
9. "Set Me Free" - 4:24
10. "Snowfall" - 3:21
11. "You Don't Want Me Around" - 2:31
12. "May Peace Find You Tonight" - 3:58

== Chart positions ==
Chart	Peak position
Top Country Albums	67
