= Somewhere in Time (Reckless Kelly album) =

Studio album by Reckless Kelly
- Released: February 9, 2010
- Genre: Country rock
- Length: 44:11
- Label: Yep Roc
- Producer: David Abeyta; Cody Braun; Willy Braun

Reckless Kelly chronology
Bulletproof (2008)	Somewhere in Time (2010)	Good Luck & True Love (2011)

Professional ratings
Review scores
Source	Rating
Allmusic	4/5 stars

Somewhere in Time is the sixth studio album by American country rock band Reckless Kelly. It was released on February 9, 2010 by Yep Roc Records. The album peaked at number 22 on the Billboard Top Country Albums chart.

== Track listing ==
1. "Little Blossom" (Pinto Bennett) – 5:00
2. "The Ballad of Elano Deleon" (Bennett) – 3:25
3. "Bird on a Wire" (Bennett) – 3:36
4. "Everything I Could Do Wrong" (Bennett, Richard Dobson) – 4:13
5. "Some People's Kids" (Bennett) – 3:05
6. "I Hold the Bottle, You Hold the Wheel" (Bennett) – 3:32
7. "Best Forever Yet" (Bennett) – 3:21
8. "Idaho Cowboy" (Bennett, Baxter Black) – 3:07
9. "Pure Quill" (Bennett) – 4:14
10. "You Cared Enough to Lie" (Bennett, Sergio Webb) – 2:56
11. "Thelma" (Bennett, Black) – 4:10
12. "Somewhere in Time" (Bennett, Webb) – 3:32

== Chart performance ==
Chart (2010)	Peak position
U.S. Billboard Top Country Albums	22
U.S. Billboard 200	146
U.S. Billboard Top Heatseekers	2
U.S. Billboard Independent Albums	15
