= You Can't Save Everybody =

Studio album by Kieran Kane & Kevin Welch with Fats Kaplin
- Released: July 20, 2004
- Genre: Country
- Length: 41:57
- Label: Dead Reckoning Records
- Producer: Kieran Kane, Kevin Welch & Fats Kaplin

Professional ratings
Review scores
Source	Rating
Allmusic	3.5/5 stars

You Can't Save Everybody is an album by Kieran Kane, Kevin Welch, and Fats Kaplin. Claudia Scott is listed as a special guest vocalist. Rick Anderson of AllMusic stated in his review that this album was "Highly recommended overall."

== Track listing ==
No.	Title	Writer(s)	Length
1.	"You Can't Save Everybody"	Kieran Kane; Sean Locke	3:13
2.	"Dark Eyed Gal"	Ron Davies	3:58
3.	"Hillbilly Blue"	Kieran Kane; Sean Locke	3:11
4.	"Jersey Devil"	Kevin Welch	4:21
5.	"Somewhere in the Middle"	Kieran Kane	2:41
6.	"Flycatcher Jack and the Whippoorwill's Song"	Kevin Welch	4:01
7.	"Callin' Me"	Kieran Kane; Sean Locke	2:47
8.	"Till I'm Too Old to Die Young"	Kevin Welch; Scott Dooley; John Hadley	3:29
9.	"Cecil's Lament"	Kieran Kane	2:50
10.	"Everybody's Working for the Man Again…"	Kevin Welch	4:09
11.	"Just Like That"	Kieran Kane; John Hadley	3:30
12.	"A Prayer Like Any Other"	Kevin Welch	3:47
Total length:			41:57

== Musicians ==
- Kieran Kane: Vocals, Guitar, Octave Mandolin, Banjo, Boxes, Shakers, Whappers, Feets
- Kevin Welch: Vocals, Guitar, Octave Mandolin
- Fats Kaplin: Button Accordion, Tenor Banjo, Dan Electro, Fiddle
- Claudia Scott: Special Guest Vocalist

== Production ==
- Kieran Kane, Kevin Welch & Fats Kaplin: Producers
- Philip Scoggins: Recorded, Mixed and Mastered
- Charles Yingling: 2nd Engineer
- Photography: Mark Montgomery
- Graphic Design: Beech
- Cover Painting: Kieran Kane

All track information and credits were taken from the CD liner notes.
