= Glenn Worf =

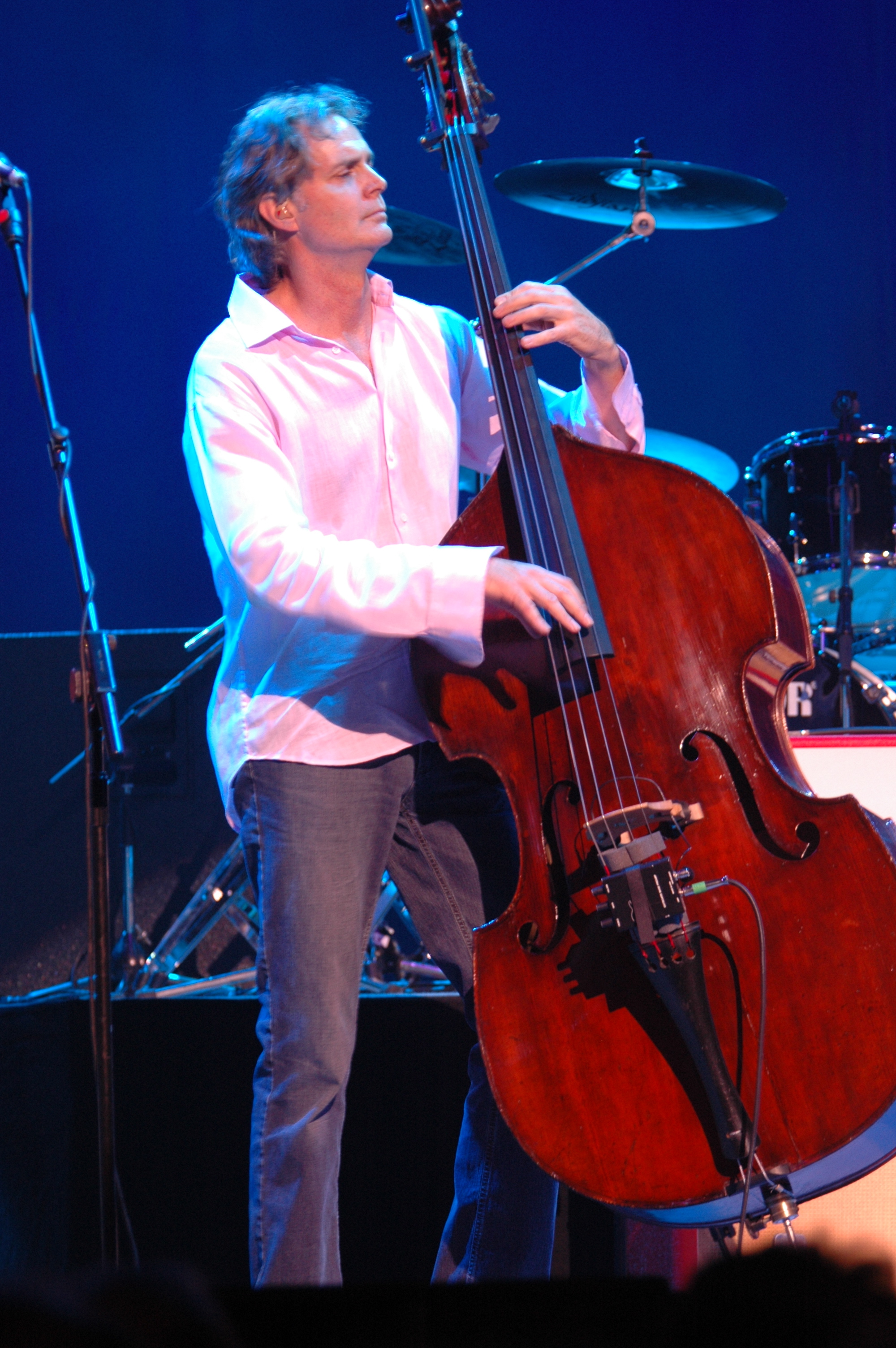
- Glenn Worf in 2005 at the NAC in Ottawa

Background information
- Born: January 24, 1954 (age 71); Dayton, Ohio, USA
- Origin: Madison, Wisconsin, USA
- Genres: Country
- Occupation: Musician
- Instrument(s): Bass guitar String bass
- Member of: Mark Knopfler
- Website: Authorized Biography

Glenn Worf is an American bassist known mainly for his work as a session musician. He has recorded with many major country music acts and also tours with Mark Knopfler.

== Early life and education ==
Worf was born in Dayton, Ohio, and grew up in Madison, Wisconsin. He has concentrated on the bass guitar since the age of 13. He majored in music at the University of Wisconsin–Eau Claire. Eventually, he moved to Nashville, Tennessee.

== Career ==
Throughout his career, Worf has recorded with numerous performers including Bryan Adams, Trace Adkins, Craig Campbell, Billy Ray Cyrus, Alan Jackson, Wynonna Judd, Toby Keith, Martina McBride, Reba McEntire, Tim McGraw, Mark Knopfler, Jimmy Buffett, Miranda Lambert, Aaron Neville, Lee Roy Parnell, Kellie Pickler, Kenny Rogers, Bob Seger, Sugarland, Shania Twain, Keith Urban, Lee Ann Womack, and Tammy Wynette.

He is perhaps most well known for his work with former Dire Straits front man Mark Knopfler. Worf has contributed double and electric bass parts to every Knopfler solo album and is a member of his touring band. He also contributed to the BBC documentary on Knopfler, Mark Knopfler: a Life in Songs, shown on BBC 4 on 28 January 2011.

In addition to his studio work, Worf performs regularly in and around Nashville with artists such as Mike Henderson and Kevin Welch.
