= 11/12/13: Live in Melbourne =

Live album by Kieran Kane & Kevin Welch
- Released: August 2, 2000
- Venue: The Continental, Melbourne, Australia
- Genre: Country
- Length: 62:43
- Label: Dead Reckoning Records

Professional ratings
Review scores
Source	Rating
AllMusic	3/5 stars

11/12/13: Live in Melbourne is a live album by Kieran Kane and Kevin Welch, recorded at The Continental, Melbourne, Australia on November 12–13, 1999. They played unaccompanied, using acoustic guitars and mandolin. Most of the songs are original compositions either written or co-written by Kane or Welch. The two exceptions are covers of John Hiatt's "Train to Birmingham" and Hank Williams' "Ramblin' Man."

== Critical reception ==
Richie Unterberger of AllMusic writes, "There's an informal, playing-before-friends feel to the performances, on tunes that are mostly good-natured and easygoing."

The review at No Depression concludes with, "Both singers are probably better presented on their own discs, but 11/12/13 allows for a worthy examination of two fine artists in a rare, no-pressure setting. Think of it as a pair of cool guys trading off playing songs for you in your living room, and it comes out a winner."

Robert Wooldridge of Country Standard Time begins his review with, "Recorded on November 12th and 13th, 1999 (thus the title), this live acoustic set is reminiscent of the VH1 Storytellers performance by Johnny Cash and Willie Nelson-two singer/songwriters with their guitars trading off songs."

== Track listing ==
- Track information and credits taken from the album's liner notes.

No.	Title	Writer(s)	Length
1.	"Intro"	Kieran Kane; Kevin Welch	0:24
2.	"Something 'Bout You"	Kevin Welch	3:40
3.	"Eight More Miles"	Kieran Kane	3:42
4.	"While I Was Loving You"	Kevin Welch	2:53
5.	"Four Questions"	Kieran Kane	3:15
6.	"Train To Birmingham"	John Hiatt	4:44
7.	"Table Top Dancer"	Kieran Kane	4:17
8.	"Life Down Here On Earth"	Kevin Welch; Gary Scruggs	3:58
9.	"If I Could Be There"	Kieran Kane; Jamie O'Hara	2:53
10.	"Some Kind Of Paradise"	Kevin Welch	8:36
11.	"Ramblin' Man"	Hank Williams	4:07
12.	"Sam's Town"	Kevin Welch; Gary Nicholson	4:00
13.	"In a Town This Size"	Kieran Kane	5:01
14.	"Wilson's Tracks"	Kevin Welch	5:10
15.	"When We're Gone, Long Gone"	Kieran Kane; Jamie O'Hara	6:03
Total length:			62:43

== Musicians ==
- Kieran Kane: Vocals, Mandolin, Guitar
- Kevin Welch: Vocals, Guitar
