= Reckless Kelly (band) =

American band

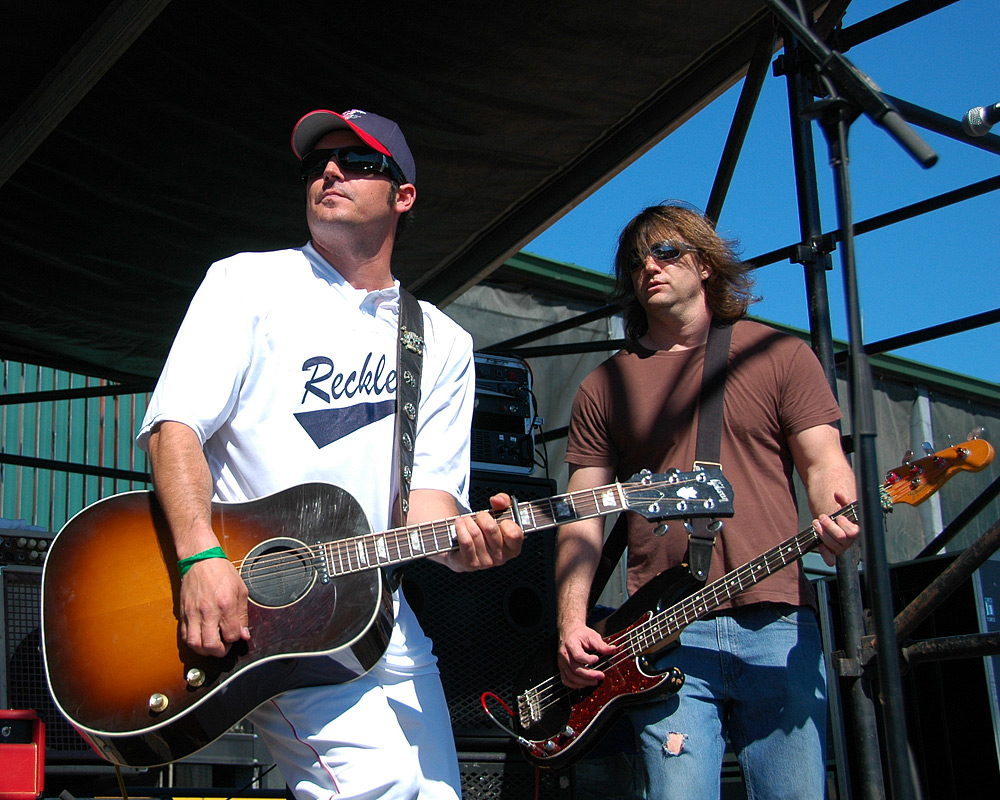
- Willy Braun and Chris Schelske at the Reckless Kelly Celebrity Softball Jam

Background information
- Origin: Stanley, Idaho, U.S.
- Genres: Country rock
- Years active: 1997-present.
- Labels: Cold Spring, Valley, Sugar Hill, Yep Roc
- Members: Willy Braun; Cody Braun; Geoffrey Queen; Jay Nazz; Joe Miller
- Past members: David Abeyta; Casey Pollock; Adam Odor; Jimmy "JAM" McFeeley; Chris Schelske
- Website: www.recklesskelly.com

Reckless Kelly is an American country rock band formed in Stanley, Idaho. The band relocated to Austin, Texas, in October 1996.

== History ==
Led by brothers Willy (vocals/guitar) and Cody Braun (vocals/fiddle/mandolin/harmonica), the alternative country-rock outfit Reckless Kelly formed in Stanley, Idaho, in February 1996 before moving to Austin, Texas. The Brauns had previously toured with their father in Muzzie Braun and the Boys, a Western swing band, and were joined in their own group by the lead guitarist Casey Pollock, bass guitarist Chris Schelske, and drummer Jay Nazz.

With their younger brothers Micky and Gary, Cody and Willy were raised in central Idaho near the Sawtooth Mountains, between Clayton and Challis in Custer County, and were homeschooled by their mother. Originally they were "Muzzie Braun and the Little Braun Brothers", as Muzzie and his brothers Gary and Billy were the "Braun Brothers" from Twin Falls in the 1970s and early 1980s, sons of musician Eustaceus "Mustie" Braun. From North Dakota, Mustie was a neighbor and relative of the bandleader Lawrence Welk's, and was a keyboard player during the last days of legalized gambling in Idaho at Weiser in the early 1950s. He then moved to the new Club 93 in Jackpot, Nevada, on the Idaho border, and moved his family to Twin Falls, about fifty miles (80 km) north. In February 1981, Mustie and wife Marian (née Beckman) were involved in a head-on collision north of Jackpot, and both died from their injuries.

In 1989, Muzzie and his sons appeared on Johnny Carson's Tonight Show twice.

Reckless Kelly played locally on the historic Sixth Street in Austin. They turned Lucy's Retired Surfers Bar, a small bar and restaurant, into a noted music venue with their Monday night residency from November 1996 to May 1998. During this period, other music venues in Austin invited them to play, including the Continental Club, the Saxon Pub, Stubb's Barbecue, and Antone's Home of the Blues.

Reckless Kelly's first album, Millican, appeared in fall 1997 and was officially released in 1998. Acoustic: Live at Stubb's and The Day followed two years later, after which David Abeyta replaced Pollock on lead guitar. Under the Table and Above the Sun in 2003 began the band's relationship with the high-profile Sugar Hill label and won the hearts of the music press and the honky-tonk legend Joe Ely, who sang the band's praises in interviews. Wicked Twisted Road was released in 2005, and the next year, the live album Reckless Kelly Was Here captured the band's stage presence. Bulletproof was released in summer 2008 on a new label, Yep Roc Records, and includes tracks critical of and reflecting on recent sociopolitical unfoldings, such as the Iraq War and Hurricane Katrina. In 2010, Reckless released an album of songs by one of their musical heroes, Pinto Bennett. Somewhere in Time, in the band's own words, highlighted their love of "straight-up honky tonk". The band regularly returns to Austin to play before capacity crowds at venues such as Nutty Brown Cafe and Amphitheatre.

Younger brothers Micky and Gary Braun front their own band, Micky and the Motorcars. Both bands play at the annual Braun Brothers Reunion in Challis, Idaho, in August.

== Discography ==
=== Studio albums ===
| Title | Album details | Peak chart positions | | | |
| Title | Album details | US Country | US | US Heat | US Indie |
|---|---|---|---|---|---|
| Millican | Release date: July 7, 1998; Label: Cold Spring | — | — | — | — |
| The Day | Release date: October 31, 2000; Label: Valley Entertainment | — | — | — | — |
| Under the Table & Above the Sun | Release date: May 13, 2003; Label: Sugar Hill Records | 67 | — | — | — |
| Wicked Twisted Road | Release date: February 8, 2005; Label: Sugar Hill Records | 66 | — | — | — |
| Bulletproof | Release date: June 24, 2008; Label: Yep Roc Records | 22 | 117 | 2 | 14 |
| Somewhere in Time | Release date: February 9, 2010; Label: Yep Roc Records | 22 | 146 | 2 | 15 |
| Good Luck & True Love | Release date: September 13, 2011; Label: No Big Deal/Red Eye | 20 | 78 | — | 18 |
| Long Night Moon | Release date: September 3, 2013; Label: No Big Deal/Red Eye | 22 | 106 | — | 22 |
| Sunset Motel | Release date: September 23, 2016; Label: No Big Deal/Thirty Tigers | 12 | 191 | — | — |
| American Jackpot / American Girls | Release date: May 22, 2020 (Digital); Release date: July 24, 2020 (CD); Label: No Big Deal/Thirty Tigers | — | — | — | — |
"—" denotes releases that did not chart

=== Live albums ===
| Title | Album details | Peak chart positions | | |
| Title | Album details | US Country | US Heat | US Indie |
|---|---|---|---|---|
| Acoustic: Live at Stubb's | Release date: June 6, 2000; Label: Valley Entertainment | — | — | — |
| Reckless Kelly Was Here | Release date: August 8, 2006; Label: Sugar Hill Records | 56 | 41 | 38 |
"—" denotes releases that did not chart

=== Compilations ===
| Title | Album details |
|---|---|
| Best of the Sugar Hill Years | Release date: July 10, 2007; Label: Sugar Hill Records |

=== Music videos ===
| Year | Video | Director |
|---|---|---|
| 2003 | "Nobody's Girl" | Lawrence Carroll |
| 2005 | "Stick Around" | Peter Zavadil |
| 2006 | "I Still Do" | Peter Zavadil |
| 2008 | "Ragged as the Road" | Peter Zavadil |
| 2012 | "Pennsylvania Avenue" | |
| 2019 | "You Don't Have to Stay Forever (Live)" | Tony Gates |
| 2020 | "American Girls" | Tony Gates |

== Current members ==
- Willy Braun (lead vocals, guitar, harmonica )
- Cody Braun (vocals, fiddle, mandolin, harmonica)
- Jay "Nazz" Nazziola (drums)
- Joe Miller (bass guitar)
- Geoffrey Queen (lead guitar)

== Former members ==
- Casey Pollock (lead guitar)
- Jimmy "Jam" McFeeley (bass guitar)
- Chris "Shifty" Schelske (bass guitar)
- David Abeyta (lead guitar, vocals)
