= Kieran Kane =

American country music artist (born 1949)

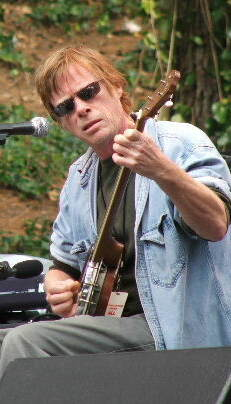
- Kieran Kane at Hardly Strictly Bluegrass Festival in San Francisco, CA

Background information
- Born: October 7, 1949 (age 76)
- Origin: Queens, New York, U.S.
- Genre: Country
- Occupation: Singer-songwriter
- Instruments: Vocals guitar banjo mandolin percussion
- Years active: 1970–present
- Labels: Asylum, Columbia, Atlantic, Dead Reckoning
- Formerly of: The O'Kanes

Kieran Kane (born October 7, 1949) is an American country music artist, as well as the owner of Dead Reckoning Records, an independent record label. Between 1986 and 1990, he and Jamie O'Hara comprised The O'Kanes, a duo which charted seven singles on the U.S. Billboard Hot Country Singles charts, including the Number One single "Can't Stop My Heart from Loving You". In addition, Kieran charted a string of solo singles on Asylum Records in 1982. After The O'Kanes disbanded in 1990, both O'Hara and Kane recorded solo albums of their own. Kane was also responsible for writing the song "I'll Go On Loving You" which was a top 5 country hit for Alan Jackson in 1998.

== Biography ==
Kane was born in Queens, New York. His first musical experience was at age nine, playing drums in his brother's rock band. Eventually, Kane shifted his focus to bluegrass, before relocating to Los Angeles, California where he found work as a session guitarist and songwriter.

Kieran moved to Nashville, Tennessee by the 1980s, eventually signing to a publishing contract. He was also signed to a recording contract with Asylum Records, releasing his self-titled album in 1982. This album included two Top 20 country hits.

== The O'Kanes ==
Jamie O'Hara, another songwriter who worked for the same publishing company, first collaborated with Kane on a song entitled "Bluegrass Blues", eventually recorded by The Judds. Afterwards, the two began writing more songs together, and by 1986, they decided to form a duo known as The O'Kanes.

Signed to Columbia Records in 1986, The O'Kanes recorded three studio albums for the label, in addition to charting seven singles on the Billboard Hot Country Singles charts. Their third album failed to produce any singles, however, and by 1990, the duo parted ways.

== Return to solo career ==
In 1993, Kieran returned to his career as a solo performer. He signed to Atlantic Records that year, releasing the album Find My Way Home. Due to poor sales of this album, he was soon dropped from Atlantic's roster. Two years later, Kane, along with three other Nashville singer-songwriters, founded Dead Reckoning Records, an independent record label specializing in country music. The label's first release was his second studio album, titled Dead Rekoning.

== Personal life ==
Kane has three children. His son Lucas occasionally plays percussion at his performances.

== Discography ==
=== Albums ===
Year	Album	US Country	Label
1982	Kieran Kane	38	Elektra
1993	Find My Way Home		Atlantic
1995	Dead Rekoning		Dead Reckoning
1998	Six Months, No Sun		Dead Reckoning
2000	11/12/13: Live in Melbourne (with Kevin Welch)		Dead Reckoning
2000	The Blue Chair		Dead Reckoning
2002	Shadows on the Ground		Dead Reckoning
2004	You Can't Save Everybody (with Kevin Welch and Fats Kaplin)		Dead Reckoning
2006	Lost John Dean (with Kevin Welch and Fats Kaplin)		Dead Reckoning
2007	Kane Welch Kaplin (with Kevin Welch and Fats Kaplin)		Dead Reckoning
2009	Somewhere Beyond the Roses		Dead Reckoning
2018	The Ledges (with Rayna Gellert)		Dead Reckoning
2019	When The Sun Goes Down (with Rayna Gellert)		Dead Reckoning
2022	The Flowers That Bloom in Spring (with Rayna Gellert)		Dead Reckoning

=== Singles ===
Year	Single	Peak positions	Album
Year	Single	US Country	Album
1981	"The Baby"	80	—N/a
1981	"You're the Best"	14	Kieran Kane
1981	"It's Who You Love"	16	Kieran Kane
1982	"I Feel It with You"	26	Kieran Kane
1982	"I'll Be Your Man Around the House"	26	Kieran Kane
1982	"Gonna Have a Party"	45	—N/a
1983	"It's You"	30	—N/a
1984	"Dedicate"	28	—N/a
1993	"I'm Here to Love You"	—	Find My Way Home
1993	"Find My Way Home"	—	Find My Way Home
1995	"This Dirty Little Town"	—	Dead Rekoning
1995	"Cool Me Down"	—	Dead Rekoning
"—" denotes releases that did not chart

=== Music videos ===
Year	Video	Director
1993	"I'm Here to Love You"	Martin Kahan
1993	"Find My Way Home"	Martin Kahan
1995	"This Dirty Little Town"	
1995	"Cool Me Down"	Martin Kahan
1998	"Hysteria"	

=== Filmography ===
- Killers of the Flower Moon
