= Claudia Scott =

Norwegian/British musician

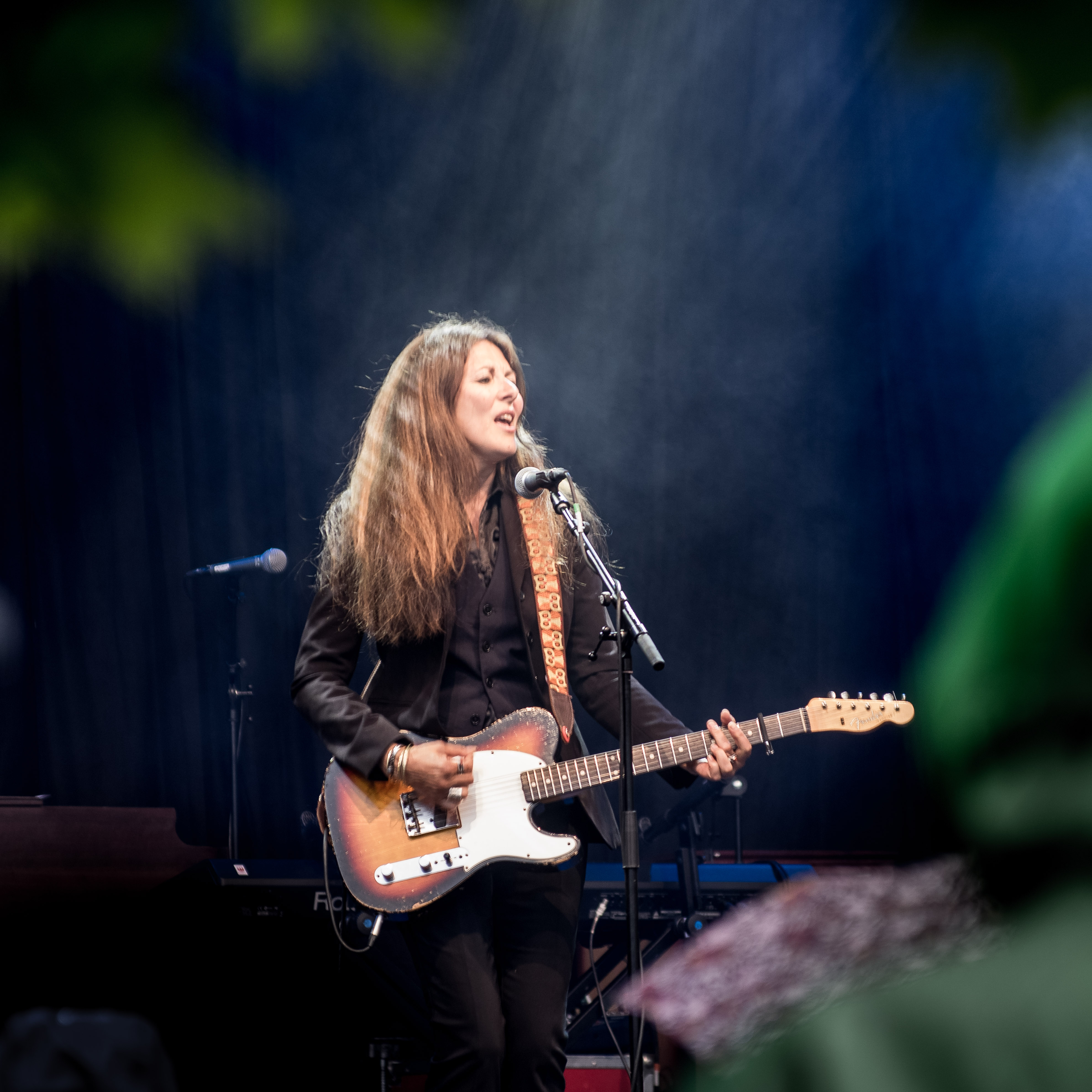

Background information
- Born: 8 October 1957 (age 68); Newcastle upon Tyne, England, UK
- Origin: Bergen, Norway
- Genres: Americana; country
- Website: http://www.claudiascott.com/

Claudia Lorraine Scott (born 8 October 1957) is a Norwegian/British singer, musician, composer and producer associated primarily with country music and American folk music genres. She is an RN.

She was born in Newcastle, but hails from Bergen, Norway, and moved to Nashville in 1999. She has won the Spellemann Award twice, in 1985 and 2014.
