= Fats Kaplin =

American musician

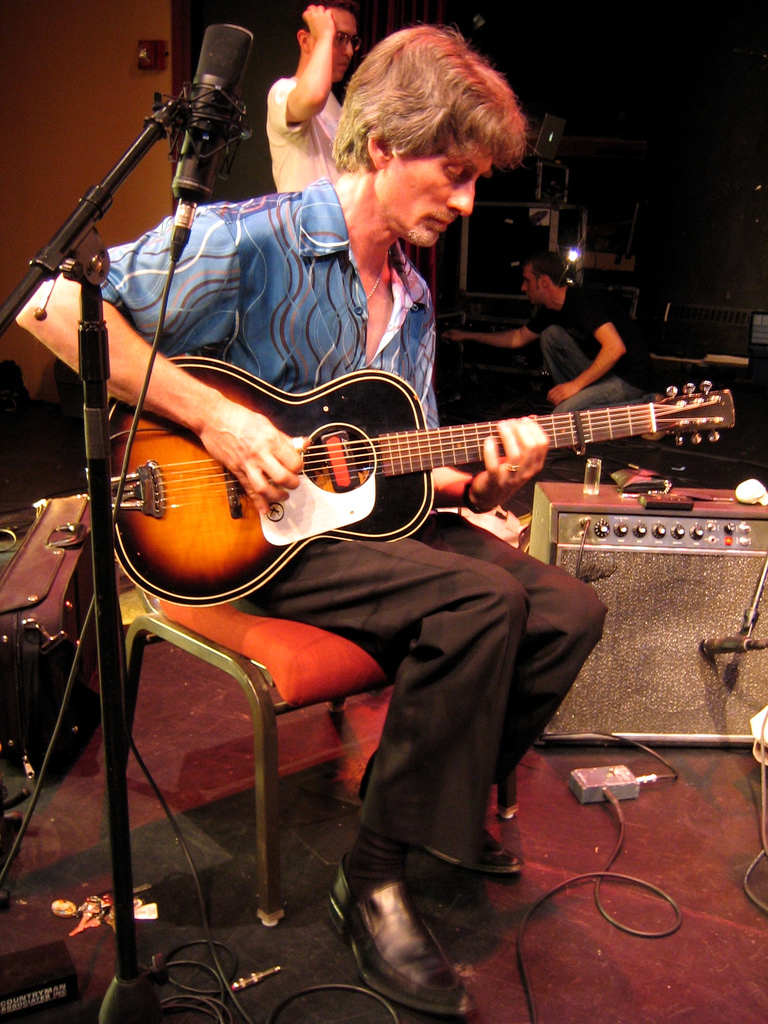

Background information
- Born: Manhattan, New York, United States
- Years active: 2004–present

Fats Kaplin is an American musician, born in New York City. He is best known as a fiddler. He also plays guitar, button accordion, banjo, mandolin, steel guitar, an Arab oud, and a Turkish cümbüş, among others. He has worked with artists such as Jack White, Trisha Yearwood, The Tractors, Nanci Griffith, Pure Prairie League, John Prine, Roy Book Binder, Beck, Mitski, and Tinariwen.

He currently resides in Nashville, Tennessee and is married to musician Kristi Rose. In 2003, he started playing with fellow country artists and Nashville residents Kieran Kane and Kevin Welch, as Kane Welch Kaplin.

== Discography ==
- This Is Pulp Country!, 2004
- The Fatman Cometh, 2006
- Fats Kaplins' World of Wonder Downunder, 2009
- Waking Hour, 2011 (David Francy) — fiddle
- Morning Phase, 2014 (Beck) - banjo

=== With Kristi Rose ===
- I Wonder As I Wander, 2010
- You're Still Around, 2011

=== With Kane Welch Kaplin ===
- You Can't Save Everybody, 2004
- Lost John Dean, 2006
- Kane Welch Kaplin, 2007
