= Mike Henderson =

American singer-songwriter (1953–2023)

- Born: Michael James Henderson; July 14, 1953; Independence, Missouri, U.S.
- Died: September 22, 2023 (aged 70)
- Genres: Country, blues, bluegrass
- Occupation: Singer-songwriter
- Instruments: Guitar, mandolin, fiddle, harmonica
- Years active: 1981–2023
- Labels: RCA Nashville, Dead Reckoning
- Formerly of: The SteelDrivers
- Website: www.mikehenderson.com

Michael James Henderson (July 14, 1953 – September 22, 2023) was an American singer-songwriter. In addition to his solo career, which included five studio albums, Henderson was a member of the country band The SteelDrivers from 2005 to 2011 and was a songwriting collaborator of his former SteelDrivers bandmate Chris Stapleton.

== Biography ==
=== Early life and career ===
Henderson was born in Independence, Missouri, in 1953. He was an original member of blues group the Bel Airs when they formed in Missouri in 1981. They released an album, Need Me a Car, on Blind Pig Records in 1984. Henderson left the band in 1985 and moved to Nashville. The following year, he joined the roots rock band The Roosters. He was also a member of spin-off band The Kingsnakes. The Kingsnakes began playing weekly at the Bluebird Cafe in July 1986. They shortened their name to The Snakes when they were signed by Curb Records. An album, The Snakes, was released by Curb in 1989.

In 1988, The Fabulous Thunderbirds covered "Powerful Stuff", a song Henderson had written for The Snakes, for the soundtrack to the film Cocktail. Henderson later became a staff songwriter for EMI. His songs have been recorded by the Dixie Chicks, Trisha Yearwood, Gary Allan and Patty Loveless, among others. Henderson also found work in Nashville as a slide guitarist. He played on albums by Emmylou Harris, John Hiatt, Joy Lynn White and Kelly Willis.

=== Country Music Made Me Do It ===
Henderson's demos drew the attention of country music label RCA Nashville. RCA signed Henderson and released his solo debut album, Country Music Made Me Do It, in March 1994. Bob Cannon of Entertainment Weekly gave the album an A− grade, writing that Henderson's "enthusiastic field holler and his guitar's riveting twang give off enough sparks to ignite [the songs]." Dan Kening of the Chicago Tribune gave the album three and a half stars, saying that "Henderson downplays his guitar chops on his first solo album in favor of his songwriting and strong vocals and acquits himself admirably." The album also received a favorable review from Peter Cronin of Billboard, who declared that "Henderson comes to the party with plenty of attitude and a distinctive point of view."

The album's first single, "Hillbilly Jitters", peaked at number 69 on the Billboard Hot Country Singles & Tracks chart. When subsequent singles "The Want To" and "If the Jukebox Took Teardrops" failed to chart, Henderson was dropped by the label. "If the Jukebox Took Teardrops" was later a minor chart hit for Danni Leigh in 1998.

=== Edge of Night ===
After being dropped by RCA, Henderson founded the label Dead Reckoning Records with Kieran Kane, Kevin Welch, Tammy Rogers and Harry Stinson. His second album, Edge of Night, was released by Dead Reckoning in January 1996. The video for the first single, a cover of Eddy Clearwater's "I Wouldn't Lay My Guitar Down", was added by CMT in February 1996. Tony Scherman of Entertainment Weekly gave the album a B+ grade, writing that Henderson is "a good songwriter, even if he wears his influences a little too plainly." Parry Gettelman of the Orlando Sentinel gave the album five stars, stating that Henderson's "strong, slightly sandpapery voice is as soulful as it is twangy." Chet Flippo of Billboard also reviewed the album favorably, saying that "Henderson manages to sound at once world-weary and exuberant in a solid lineup of original material and country chestnuts."

=== First Blood ===
Later in 1996, Henderson formed the blues band Mike Henderson & the Bluebloods with Reese Wynans on piano, Glenn Worf on bass and John Gardner on drums. They released the album First Blood in October 1996 on Dead Reckoning. Mark Knopfler wrote the album's liner notes. Alanna Nash of Entertainment Weekly gave the album an A grade, writing that "First Blood's blistering, seamless blues covers prove [Henderson]'s a remarkable guitarist and frontman." A review in People stated that "when the combination of piano, bass, drums and electric guitar is as neck-snappingly strong as it is on the Bluebloods' first album, you don't need other instruments, original compositions or even many original ideas to deliver a knockout blow." Linda Ray of No Depression also gave the album a positive review, praising Henderson's "masterful guitar and vocals" and saying that "the way he plays that slide is likely illegal in several states." The song "Pay Bo Diddley" received some radio airplay.

=== Thicker Than Water ===
Mike Henderson & the Bluebloods released their second album, Thicker Than Water, in January 1999 with John Barlow Jarvis replacing Reese Wynans on piano. Becky Byrkit of AllMusic gave the album four stars out of five, writing that "Henderson contributes a particularly clear vocal style with plenty of simultaneous character from both the blues and true-blue country music." The album received a mixed review in People, which praised Jarvis' "richly layered, hard-driving solos" but compared Henderson's vocals to "the white-guy-trying-to-sound-soulful desperation of Dan Aykroyd and John Belushi in their Blues Brothers mode." Ed Kopp of All About Jazz gave the album a positive review, saying that "leader Mike Henderson is a highly capable slide guitarist, harpist, and singer, but the guy who makes this CD extra special is John Jarvis." Tim Steil of the Chicago Tribune also gave the album a favorable review, stating that "whether playing Hound Dog Taylor-ish slide, or blowing harp lines that would make Little Walter smile, Henderson deftly conjures the sound of '50s Chicago."

=== Later career ===
Henderson toured with Mark Knopfler on his 2001 Sailing to Philadelphia Tour. In 2008, Henderson was one of the founding members of bluegrass group The SteelDrivers. He played mandolin, resophonic guitar and harmonica and co-wrote most of the band's original songs. The SteelDrivers' 2010 album Reckless was nominated for a Grammy Award for Best Bluegrass Album at the 53rd Annual Grammy Awards in 2011. Henderson left The SteelDrivers in December 2011.

Adele performed Henderson's song "If It Hadn't Been for Love" for her 2011 DVD Live at the Royal Albert Hall.

Henderson continued to play weekly shows at the Bluebird Cafe with the Mike Henderson Band.

=== Death ===
Mike Henderson died unexpectedly in his sleep on September 22, 2023, at the age of 70.

== Discography ==
=== Albums ===
Title	Released	Label
Country Music Made Me Do It: No. / Title / Writer(s) / Length; 1. / "Fountain of Youth" / Mike Henderson; John Ivan / 2:31; 2. / "The Want To" / Mike Henderson; Wally Wilson / 3:08; 3. / "Hillbilly Jitters" / Mike Henderson; Wally Wilson / 3:37; 4. / "Prisoner's Tears" / Mike Henderson; Mark Irwin; Wally Wilson / 3:16; 5. / "Wishful Thinkin'" / Mike Henderson; Wally Wilson / 3:15; 6. / "Country Music Made Me Do It" / Mike Henderson; Wally Wilson / 2:58; 7. / "The Restless Kind" / Mike Henderson / 3:23; 8. / "That Train Don't Stop Here Anymore" / Mike Henderson; John Scott Sherrill / 2:57; 9. / "That's How I Remember You" / Mike Henderson; Wally Wilson / 2:43; 10. / "If the Jukebox Took Teardrops" / Mike Henderson; Mark Irwin / 2:19; Total length: / / / 30:07	March 15, 1994	RCA Nashville
Edge of Night: No. / Title / Writer(s) / Length; 1. / "I Wouldn't Lay My Guitar Down" / Eddy Clearwater / 2:28; 2. / "Wherever You Are" / Mike Henderson; Mark Irwin / 3:45; 3. / "Nobody's Fault But Mine" / Traditional / 2:39; 4. / "The Edge of Night" / Mike Henderson; Charlie White / 4:19; 5. / "One Foot in the Honky Tonk" / Mike Henderson; Kevin Welch / 3:03; 6. / "This May Be the Last Time" / Roebuck "Pops" Staples / 3:58; 7. / "(You're So Square) Baby I Don't Care" / Jerry Leiber; Mike Stoller / 2:27; 8. / "Honky Tonk Vacation (Tribute to Waylon)" / Mike Henderson; Wally Wilson / 2:53; 9. / "This Property Is Condemned" / Mike Henderson; Wally Wilson / 3:53; 10. / "Take Me Back and Try Me" / Ernest Tubb / 2:20; 11. / "Drivin' Nails in My Coffin" / Jerry Irby / 2:42; Total length: / / / 34:27	January 16, 1996	Dead Reckoning Records
First Blood (Mike Henderson & the Bluebloods): No. / Title / Writer(s) / Length; 1. / "When I Get Drunk" / (unknown artist) / 5:56; 2. / "So Sad to Be Lonesome" / Sonny Boy Williamson II / 4:19; 3. / "Hip Shakin'" / Joseph Benjamin Hutto / 4:04; 4. / "Pony Blues" / Charley Patton / 5:46; 5. / "Bloody Murder" / Otis Spann / 5:04; 6. / "Pay Bo Diddley" / Bo Diddley; Gary Nicholson; Wally Wilson / 5:07; 7. / "When The Welfare Turns It's Back On You" / Lucious Weaver; Sonny Thompson / 4:56; 8. / "Give Me Back My Wig" / Theodore Roosevelt Taylor / 4:18; 9. / "How Many More Years" / Chester Burnett / 4:44; 10. / "Mean Mistreater" / Elmore James / 4:28; Total length: / / / 48:42	October 15, 1996	Dead Reckoning Records
Thicker Than Water (Mike Henderson & the Bluebloods): No. / Title / Writer(s) / Length; 1. / "Keep What You've Got" / Stanley Lewis / 3:34; 2. / "Wouldn't Lay My Guitar Down" / Edward Harrington / 3:14; 3. / "Whiskey Store" / Mike Henderson; Glenn Worf / 3:35; 4. / "I Need Me a Car" / Stanley Lewis / 4:24; 5. / "Tears Like a River" / Mike Henderson; Glenn Worf / 4:30; 6. / "Scared of That Child" / Sonny Boy Williamson II / 3:08; 7. / "All My Money's Gone" / Mike Henderson; Glenn Worf / 4:39; 8. / "Mister Downchild" / Sonny Boy Williamson II / 5:11; 9. / "Angel of Mercy" / Mike Henderson; Bruce McCabe / 5:29; 10. / "Slow Your Motor Down" / Mike Henderson; Glenn Worf / 4:09; 11. / "Uranium Rock" / Warren Smith / 3:41; 12. / "My Country Sugar Mama" / Chester Arthur Burnett / 4:18; Total length: / / / 49:52	January 12, 1999	Dead Reckoning Records
If You Think It's Hot Here… (The Mike Henderson Band): No. / Title / Writer(s) / Length; 1. / "I Want To Know Why" / Mike Henderson / 4:28; 2. / "Send You Back To Georgia" / Theodore Taylor / 4:22; 3. / "It's Alright" / Theodore Taylor / 3:55; 4. / "If You Think It's Hot Here" / Mike Henderson; Robert Stockton Field / 5:57; 5. / "Weepin' And Moanin'" / Mike Henderson / 5:39; 6. / "Mean Red Spider" / McKinley Morganfield / 4:48; 7. / "Possession" / Robert Johnson / 6:37; 8. / "Unseen Eye" / Sonny Boy Williamson II / 5:00; 9. / "Matchbox" / Carl Perkins / 3:05; 10. / "Gambling Blues" / Melvin Jackson / 5:37; 11. / "Rock House Blues" / Mike Henderson / 2:02; Total length: / / / 51:30	January 20, 2015	Ellersoul

=== Singles ===
Year	Single	Peak positions	Album
Year	Single	US Country	Album
1994	"Hillbilly Jitters"	69	Country Music Made Me Do It
1994	"The Want To"	—	Country Music Made Me Do It
1994	"If the Jukebox Took Teardrops"	—	Country Music Made Me Do It
1996	"I Wouldn't Lay My Guitar Down"	—	Edge of Night
"—" denotes releases that did not chart

=== Music videos ===
Year	Video
1994	"Hillbilly Jitters"
1996	"I Wouldn't Lay My Guitar Down"

== Awards and nominations ==
Year	Ceremony	Category	Recipient/Work	Result	Ref
2018	Grammy Awards	Best Country Song	Mike Henderson, Chris Stapleton – "Broken Halos"	Won	
2018	Country Music Association Awards	Song of the Year	Mike Henderson, Chris Stapleton – "Broken Halos"	Won	
2021	Country Music Association Awards	Song of the Year	Mike Henderson, Chris Stapleton – "Starting Over"	Won	
