= Kevin Welch =

American singer-songwriter

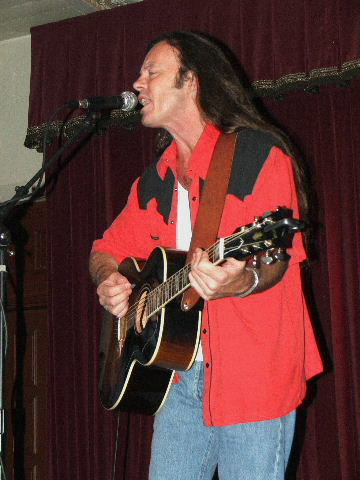
- Kevin Welch at Cactus Cafe in Austin, Texas. Photo by Ron Baker (2005).

Background information
- Born: Kevin Stephen Welch; August 17, 1955 (age 70); Long Beach, California, U.S.
- Origin: Midwest City, Oklahoma, U.S.
- Genres: Country
- Occupation: Singer-songwriter
- Years active: 1989–present
- Labels: Reprise; Dead Reckoning; Compass
- Website: http://www.kevinwelch.com/

Kevin Stephen Welch (August 17, 1955) is an American country music artist. He has charted five singles on the Billboard Hot Country Songs charts and released eight studio albums. He is also one of the cofounders of the Dead Reckoning Records label, which he founded with fellow musicians Kieran Kane, Tammy Rogers, Mike Henderson, and Harry Stinson.

== Biography ==
At the age of 7, Welch and his family moved to Midwest City, Oklahoma. After graduating high school, he began touring with bands like New Rodeo and Blue Rose Cafe.

Welch moved to Nashville in 1978 to work as a songwriter. Singers like Ricky Skaggs, Moe Bandy, Waylon Jennings, Patty Loveless, Garth Brooks, Trisha Yearwood and Don Williams were using his material. At the same time he was very active in local clubs, performing with John Scott Sherrill and the Wolves in Cheap Clothing, The Roosters, and finally his own band – The Overtones. His popularity grew and in 1988 he signed a record contract with Reprise Records.

In 1990 the album Kevin Welch was recorded and 2 years later Western Beat. The former produced four charting singles on Hot Country Songs, including "Til I See You Again," which reached No. 39.

In 1994 he co-founded Dead Reckoning Records along with Kieran Kane, Tammy Rogers, Mike Henderson and Harry Stinson. The following year Life Down Here on Earth was published and in 1999 Beneath My Wheels. The majority of songs are Welch's originals. In 2002 the album Millionaire was recorded partially in Nashville and mostly in Denmark with a line-up of Scandinavian players.

In 2004 Welch teamed up with fellow Dead Reckoning artists Kieran Kane and Fats Kaplin to produce You Can't Save Everybody. The trio followed this up with Lost John Dean in 2006, to general acclaim. Lost John Dean reached number one on the Americana charts, and resulted in nominations for several awards including Duo/Group of the year at the 2006 Americana Honors and Awards. The following eponymous Kane Welch Kaplin, with the addition of Lucas Kane, was also nominated for Duo/Group. The group traveled to Australia 10 times, as well as Europe and the UK, Canada, and all over the United States.

Throughout the 2000s, Welch has teamed up with Australian band The Flood. They have recorded albums and DVDs together, and toured the country twice.

Welch moved to Wimberley, Texas, on April 1, 2008. In 2009, he recorded A Patch Of Blue Sky, his first solo project in 8 years. He now lives in Australia with his wife, Sarah, and their family.

== Discography ==
=== Albums ===
| Year | Title | US Country | Label |
|---|---|---|---|
| 1990 | Kevin Welch | 69 | Reprise |
| 1992 | Western Beat | | Reprise |
| 1995 | Life Down Here on Earth | | Dead Reckoning |
| 1999 | Beneath My Wheels | | Dead Reckoning |
| 2000 | 11/12/13: Live in Melbourne (with Kieran Kane) | | Dead Reckoning |
| 2002 | Millionaire | | Dead Reckoning |
| 2004 | You Can't Save Everybody (with Kieran Kane and Fats Kaplin) | | Compass |
| 2006 | Lost John Dean (with Kieran Kane and Fats Kaplin) | | Compass |
| 2007 | Kane Welch Kaplin (with Kieran Kane and Fats Kaplin) | | Compass |
| 2010 | A Patch of Blue Sky | | Music Road |
| 2017 | The Dead Reckoning Years | | Dead Reckoning |
| 2018 | Dust Devil | | Dead Reckoning |

=== Singles ===
| Year | Title | Chart Positions | | Album |
| Year | Title | US Country | CAN Country | Album |
|---|---|---|---|---|
| 1989 | "Stay November" | 41 | — | Single only |
| 1989 | "I Came Straight to You" | 64 | — | Kevin Welch |
| 1990 | "Till I See You Again" | 39 | 18 | Kevin Welch |
| 1990 | "Praying for Rain" | 49 | 66 | Kevin Welch |
| 1991 | "True Love Never Dies" | 54 | 37 | Kevin Welch |
| 1991 | "Somethin' 'Bout You" | — | 80 | Western Beat |
| 1995 | "Life Down Here on Earth" | — | — | Life Down Here on Earth |
| 1995 | "I Feel Fine Today" | — | — | Life Down Here on Earth |
| 1997 | "Anna Lise Please" | — | — | Beneath My Wheels |
| 2002 | "Killing Myself" | — | — | Millionaire |

=== Guest singles ===
| Year | Title | Artist | US Country | Album |
|---|---|---|---|---|
| 1990 | "Tomorrow's World" | Various artists | 74 | Single only |

=== Music videos ===
| Year | Video | Director |
|---|---|---|
| 1990 | "Tomorrow's World" (Various Artists) | Gustavo Garzon |
| 1990 | "Till I See You Again" | Charley Randazzo |
| 1991 | "True Love Never Dies" | Charley Randazzo |
| 1992 | "Somethin' 'Bout You" | Planet Pictures |
| 1995 | "I Feel Fine Today" | Michael McNamara |
| 1996 | "Life Down Here on Earth" | Michael McNamara |
| 1999 | "Anna Lise Please" | |
| 2002 | "Killing Myself" | Chris Cates, Harry Stinson |
