= Dead Reckoning Records =

American record label

- Founded: 1994
- Founder: Kevin Welch, Kieran Kane, Mike Henderson, Tammy Rogers, Harry Stinson
- Distributor(s): Compass Records, Playground Music, Shock Records
- Genre: Country
- Country of origin: U.S.
- Location: Nashville, Tennessee
- Official website: www.deadreckoners.com

Dead Reckoning Records is an American independent record label specializing in country music. The label was established in 1994 by musicians Kevin Welch, Kieran Kane, Mike Henderson, Tammy Rogers, and Harry Stinson produce their records without the frustrations of a major record label.

== Roster ==
- Big House
- The Fairfield Four
- Mike Henderson
- Kieran Kane
- Fats Kaplin
- Charlie Major
- David Olney
- Tammy Rogers
- Harry Stinson
- Kevin Welch

== See also ==
- List of record labels
