= Noah Thompson =

American singer-songwriter

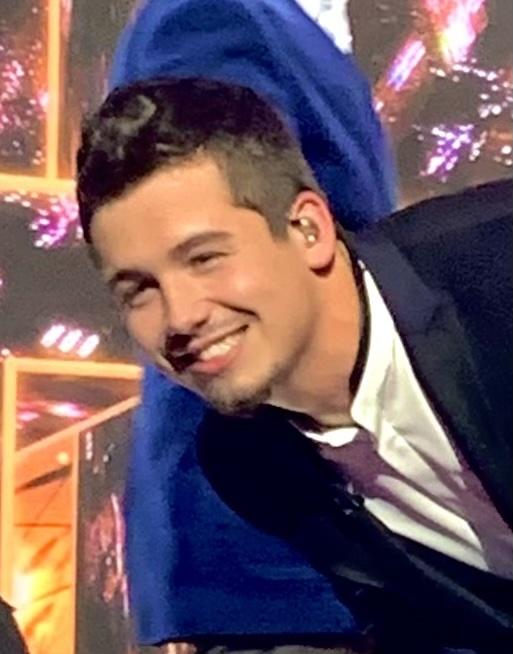
- Thompson poses for pictures by fans after he wins American Idol.

Background information
- Born: April 18, 2002 (age 24); Huntington, West Virginia, U.S.
- Origin: Louisa, Kentucky, U.S.
- Genres: Country
- Occupation: construction worker
- Instruments: Vocals; guitar
- Years active: 2021–present
- Website: noahthompsonmusic.com

Noah Thompson (born April 18, 2002) is an American singer who won the twentieth season of American Idol.

== Early life ==
Thompson was born on April 18, 2002, in Huntington, West Virginia. He attended Lawrence County High School in Louisa, Kentucky. Before competing on American Idol, he worked as a construction worker. He covered songs on his YouTube channel but has also performed his original songs, including "Not a Phase", "Pedestal" and "Heart Painted Black". He had not intended to try out for American Idol, but his friend, Arthur, signed him up to audition for the show.

== American Idol ==
Thompson won the twentieth season of American Idol on May 22, 2022.

Performances:
Week	Theme	Song(s)	Original artist(s)	Result
None	Audition	"Giving You Up"	Kameron Marlowe	Advanced
Top 59	Showstopper Round	"Stay"	Rihanna	Advanced
Top 24	Contestant's Choice	"Blue Side of the Mountain"	The SteelDrivers	Safe
Top 20	Contestant's Choice	"Falling"	Harry Styles	Safe
Top 20	Contestant's Choice	"Cover Me Up"	Jason Isbell	Safe
Top 14	Breakout hits	"Stand by Me"	Ben E. King	Safe
Top 11	Judges' song contest	"Heartbreak Warfare" (Note: Song chosen by Luke Bryan)	John Mayer	Safe
Top 10	Disney night	"You've Got a Friend in Me"	Randy Newman	Safe
Top 7 (Note: Noah Thompson tested positive for COVID-19 prior to the May 8 show, so he performed from his hotel room instead of on stage.)	TikTok	"Painted Blue"	Sundy Best	Safe
Top 7	Mother's Day	"Landslide"	Fleetwood Mac	Safe
Top 5	Carrie Underwood	"So Small"	Carrie Underwood	Safe
Top 5	Contestant's Choice	"Working Man"	Larry Fleet	Safe
Top 3	Bruce Springsteen	"I'm on Fire"	Bruce Springsteen	Winner
Top 3	Winner's song	"One Day Tonight"	Noah Thompson	Winner
Top 3	Reprise song	"Stay"	Rihanna	Winner

Non-competition performances:
Collaborator(s)	Song	Original artist
Flo Rida & American Idol Top 10	"Good Feeling"	Flo Rida
Tai Verdes & American Idol Top 10	"A-O-K"	Tai Verdes ft. 24kGoldn
Melissa Etheridge	"I'm the Only One"	Melissa Etheridge

== Discography ==
=== Extended plays ===
List of extended plays, with selected details
Title	Details
Middle of God Knows Where	Released: June 9, 2023; Label: 19, BBR; Format: Digital download

=== Singles ===
List of singles
Year	Title	Peak chart positions		Album
Year	Title	US Country	CAN Digital	Album
2022	"One Day Tonight"	48	8	Middle of God Knows Where
2022	"Stay"	—	—	Middle of God Knows Where
2022	"Make You Rich"	—	—	Middle of God Knows Where

== Awards and nominations ==
Year	Award show	Category	Nominated work	Result	Ref
2022	People's Choice Awards	Competition Contestant of 2022	Noah Thompson	Nominated	

Preceded by Chayce Beckham	American Idol winner 2022	Succeeded by Iam Tongi
