= American Idol season 20 =

American Idol
- Season 20
- Promotional poster
- Hosted by: Ryan Seacrest
- Judges: Luke Bryan; Katy Perry; Lionel Richie
- Winner: Noah Thompson
- Runner-up: HunterGirl
- No. of episodes: 20

Release
- Original network: ABC
- Original release: February 27 – May 22, 2022

Season chronology
- ← Previous; Season 19 Next → Season 21

The twentieth season of American Idol premiered on February 27, 2022, on the ABC television network. Ryan Seacrest returned as host and Luke Bryan, Katy Perry, and Lionel Richie returned as judges. Bobby Bones did not return this year as the in-house mentor.

Noah Thompson won the season on May 22, 2022. HunterGirl was the runner-up and Leah Marlene finished in third place.

== Auditions ==
Due to the COVID-19 pandemic, the Idol Across America virtual audition program that was launched last season was used again this season. Remote auditions took place from August 5 to October 28, 2021, as well as a number of open-call auditions, and from these, the producers selected the contestants who were then invited to audition in front of the judges.

American Idol introduced the "platinum ticket" during the audition round in celebration of the show's twentieth season. A total of three platinum tickets were awarded, and they gave the recipients the opportunity to advance directly to the second round of Hollywood week as well as choose their partners for that week's duet challenge before the remaining contestants were paired. The platinum ticket recipients were HunterGirl, Kenedi Anderson, and Jay.

American Idol (season 20) – auditions
City	Filming date(s)	Filming venue
Austin, Texas	October 4–7, 2021	Lakeway Resort & Spa
Los Angeles, California	October 17–20, 2021	1 Hotel West Hollywood
Nashville, Tennessee	November 11–15, 2021	Kimpton Aertson Hotel

== Hollywood week ==
Hollywood week was filmed December 6–9, 2021, at the Orpheum Theatre in Los Angeles. The format remained similar to last season. In the first round, each contestant chose and performed a song from a selection of musical genres (indie folk, pop, rock, R&B, soul, or country). For the season, contestants were mentored by American Idol alumni: Lauren Alaina (country), David Cook (rock), Lee DeWyze (indie folk), Haley Reinhart (soul), Jordin Sparks (pop), and Ruben Studdard (R&B). Those who impressed the judges advanced to the next round. The contestants were paired up by the judges and performed duets, although the Platinum Ticket winners got to choose their partners before the other contestants were paired up. They were given twelve hours to rehearse, which included consultation with a vocal coach, a stage rehearsal, and advice from one of the judges. Judges could advance either, neither, or both of the contestants to the Showstopper round.

== Showstopper round ==
The Showstopper round featured the top 59 contestants performing for the judges and a live audience at the Orpheum Theatre. This round was aired on April 4, but only 33 contestants were aired. The following day, the judges narrowed the number of contestants down 24. Here is a list of the contestants who reached the top 24 and the song they performed. Contestants are listed in the order they performed.

Showstopper round (April 4)
Contestant	Song
Leah Marlene	"She's a Self Made Man"
Jay	"Jar of Hearts"
Nicolina	"Rolling in the Deep"
Emyrson Flora	"Honey"
Katyrah Love	"Sweet Thing"
Fritz Hager	"Inconsequential Love"
Jacob Moran	"Is That Alright?"
Allegra Miles	"Reality"
Ava Maybee	"Falling"
Cameron Whitcomb	"It Ain't Me Babe"
Sir Blayke	"Honesty"
Elli Rowe	"Fields of Gold"
Mike Parker	"Second Guessing"
Tristen Gressett	"Come Together"
Christian Guardino	"Sex on Fire"
Noah Thompson	"Stay"
Cadence Baker	"The Story"
HunterGirl	"Girl Goin' Nowhere"
Danielle Finn	"Evergreen"
Sage	"I Hate This"
Kenedi Anderson	"Talking to the Moon"
Scarlet	"You Oughta Know"
Lady K	"I'd Rather Go Blind"
Dan Marshall	"Hard Workin' Man"

== Top 24 (April 10 & 11) ==
The top 24 contestants were split into two groups of twelve and performed one solo each at the Aulani resort in Kapolei, Hawaii. The first group aired on April 10, and the second group on April 11. Jimmie Allen served as a guest mentor for the first group, and Bebe Rexha for the second group. Two contestants from the first group and one from the second group were eliminated based on the public vote, and the rest advanced to the top 20. Contestants are listed in the order they performed.

Color key:

This contestant was saved by America's vote.
This contestant withdrew from the competition.
This contestant was eliminated.

Group 1 (April 10)
Contestant	Song	Result
Jay	"I Want You Back"	Safe
Elli Rowe	"Everywhere"	Safe
Tristen Gressett	"With a Little Help from My Friends"	Safe
Scarlet	"Levitating"	Eliminated
Sage	"Jolene"	Safe
Danielle Finn	"Your Song"	Eliminated
Mike Parker	"Best Shot"	Safe
Emyrson Flora	"Angels like You"	Safe
Dan Marshall	"Heaven"	Safe
Jacob Moran	"In My Blood"	Safe
HunterGirl	"Banjo"	Safe
Nicolina	"Elastic Heart"	Safe

Group 2 (April 11)
Contestant	Song	Result
Cadence Baker	"Something's Got a Hold on Me"	Safe
Sir Blayke	"Breakeven"	Eliminated
Allegra Miles	"Adore You"	Safe
Kenedi Anderson	"Human"	Withdrew (Note: Kenedi Anderson withdrew from the competition prior to the results show for personal reasons.)
Lady K	"Before He Cheats"	Safe
Ava Maybee	"Tell Me Something Good"	Safe
Noah Thompson	"Blue Side of the Mountain"	Safe
Leah Marlene	"Call Me"	Safe
Cameron Whitcomb	"Bad Moon Rising"	Safe
Christian Guardino	"Leave the Door Open"	Safe
Katyrah Love	"Blame It on the Boogie"	Safe
Fritz Hager	"Waves"	Safe

Non-competition performance (April 10)
Performers	Song
Jimmie Allen	"Down Home"

== Top 20 (April 17 & 18) ==
The top 20 performances aired on Sunday, April 17, followed by the live results show on Monday, April 18.

Color key:

This contestant was chosen by the public to advance.
This contestant was not chosen by the public, and had to perform again for the judges.
This contestant was not chosen by the public, but was chosen by the judges as a Wild Card pick.
This contestant was eliminated.

Contestants are listed in the order they performed.

Top 20 (April 17)
Contestant	Song	Result
Emyrson Flora	"Tell Me You Love Me"	Safe
Mike Parker	"Chasing After You"	Wild Card
Tristen Gressett	"Sacrifice"	Wild Card
Sage	"Rhiannon"	Wild Card
Jay	"You Know I'm No Good"	Wild Card
Nicolina	"Edge of Seventeen"	Safe
Jacob Moran	"Don't You Worry 'bout a Thing"	Wild Card
HunterGirl	"Heartbreak Down"	Safe
Elli Rowe	"Somewhere Only We Know"	Wild Card
Dan Marshall	"Friends in Low Places"	Safe
Ava Maybee	"Anyone"	Safe
Allegra Miles	"Free Fallin'"	Wild Card
Noah Thompson	"Falling"	Safe
Leah Marlene	"Heal"	Safe
Christian Guardino	"Imagine"	Safe
Fritz Hager	"When the Party's Over"	Safe
Katyrah Love	"Dream"	Wild Card
Cameron Whitcomb	"Changes"	Wild Card
Cadence Baker	"Train Wreck"	Wild Card
Lady K	"Love on the Brain"	Safe

Top 20 (April 18)
Contestant	Song	Result
Ava Maybee	"Cuz I Love You"	Safe
Christian Guardino	"Creep"	Safe
Cameron Whitcomb	"If It Hadn't Been for Love"	Eliminated
Allegra Miles	"Tainted"	Saved by the judges
Lady K	"Bust Your Windows"	Safe
HunterGirl	"Vice"	Safe
Katyrah Love	"Through the Fire"	Eliminated
Cadence Baker	"I'm Your Baby Tonight"	Eliminated
Dan Marshall	"Stuck on You"	Safe
Leah Marlene	"Wisher to the Well"	Safe
Nicolina	"She Used to Be Mine"	Safe
Sage	"Brown Eyed Lover"	Eliminated
Jay	"Believer"	Saved by the judges
Noah Thompson	"Cover Me Up"	Safe
Jacob Moran	"Rise"	Eliminated
Elli Rowe	"All I Want"	Eliminated
Emyrson Flora	"Love in the Dark"	Safe
Mike Parker	"Bed on Fire"	Saved by the judges
Fritz Hager	"Golden"	Safe
Tristen Gressett	"Are You Gonna Go My Way"	Saved by the judges

Non-competition performances
Performers	Song
Chayce Beckham	"Doin' It Right"
Alejandro Aranda	"The Darkness"
Phillip Phillips	"Love Like That"

== Top 14 ==
Color key:

This contestant was saved by America's vote.
This contestant was eliminated.
This contestant won American Idol.
This contestant was the runner-up.
This contestant finished in third place.

=== Top 14 – Breakout hits (April 24) ===
Gabby Barrett served as a guest mentor this week. On Sunday, April 24, each contestant performed one breakout hit. Contestants are listed in the order they performed.

Top 14 (April 24)
Contestant	Song	Result
Jay	"Just the Way You Are"	Safe
HunterGirl	"Baby Girl"	Safe
Christian Guardino	"Take Me to Church"	Safe
Dan Marshall	"She's Got It All"	Eliminated
Leah Marlene	"Happy Together"	Safe
Fritz Hager	"Let It Go"	Safe
Tristen Gressett	"Whataya Want from Me"	Safe
Lady K	"I Believe"	Safe
Allegra Miles	"Ocean Eyes"	Eliminated
Ava Maybee	"Sign of the Times"	Eliminated
Mike Parker	"Hurricane"	Safe
Emyrson Flora	"drivers license"	Safe
Noah Thompson	"Stand by Me"	Safe
Nicolina	"Hallelujah"	Safe

=== Top 11 – Judges' song contest (April 25) ===
On Monday, April 25, the judges chose songs for each of the contestants to perform. Luke Bryan and Katy Perry tied with the most song choices selected by the contestants, and were able to save one contestant from elimination. Contestants are listed in the order they performed.

Top 11 (April 25)
Contestant	Song	Selected by	Result
Nicolina	"Since U Been Gone"	Lionel Richie	Safe
Mike Parker	"Chasin' You"	Luke Bryan	Safe
Fritz Hager	"Wonderwall"	Luke Bryan	Safe
Christian Guardino	"I'm Not the Only One"	Katy Perry	Safe
Noah Thompson	"Heartbreak Warfare"	Luke Bryan	Safe
Lady K	"traitor"	Lionel Richie	Saved by the judges
HunterGirl	"9 to 5"	Luke Bryan	Safe
Leah Marlene	"Make You Feel My Love"	Katy Perry	Safe
Tristen Gressett	"You Can't Always Get What You Want"	Lionel Richie	Eliminated
Emyrson Flora	"Lovely"	Katy Perry	Safe
Jay	"Lilac Wine"	Katy Perry	Safe

=== Top 10 – Disney (May 1) ===
Derek Hough was a guest mentor for the week. Each contestant performed one song from a Disney film, and are listed in the order they performed.

Top 10 (May 1)
Contestant	Song	Disney film	Result
Lady K	"How Far I'll Go"	Moana	Eliminated
Noah Thompson	"You've Got a Friend in Me"	Toy Story	Safe
Emyrson Flora	"Carried Me with You"	Onward	Eliminated
HunterGirl	"I See the Light"	Tangled	Safe
Jay	"Remember Me"	Coco	Safe
Leah Marlene	"When She Loved Me"	Toy Story 2	Safe
Nicolina	"Poor Unfortunate Souls"	The Little Mermaid	Safe
Mike Parker	"You'll Be in My Heart"	Tarzan	Eliminated
Christian Guardino	"Circle of Life"	The Lion King	Safe
Fritz Hager	"Go the Distance"	Hercules	Safe

Non-competition performances
Performers	Song
Top 10 with Adassa & Rhenzy Feliz	"We Don't Talk About Bruno" (from Encanto)

=== Top 7 – TikTok & Mother's Day (May 8) ===
will.i.am served as a guest mentor this week. Each contestant performed two songs this week: one that they have posted on TikTok or has gone viral on TikTok, and one in honor of Mother's Day. Contestants are listed in the order they performed.

Top 7 (May 8)
Contestant	Order	Song	Result
Leah Marlene	1	"Electric Love"	Safe
Leah Marlene	10	"Sanctuary"	Safe
Jay	2	"I Have Nothing"	Eliminated
Jay	8	"A Song for Mama"	Eliminated
Fritz Hager (Note: Fritz Hager tested positive for COVID-19 prior to the May 8 show, so rehearsal footage was used instead of a live performance.)	3	"All My Friends"	Safe
Fritz Hager	9	"The Ocean"	Safe
Christian Guardino	4	"Lonely"	Eliminated
Christian Guardino	14	"Dear God"	Eliminated
HunterGirl	5	"You Broke Me First"	Safe
HunterGirl	11	"Like My Mother Does"	Safe
Noah Thompson (Note: Noah Thompson tested positive for COVID-19 prior to the May 8 show, so he performed from his hotel room instead of on stage.)	6	"Painted Blue"	Safe
Noah Thompson	12	"Landslide"	Safe
Nicolina	7	"Alone"	Safe
Nicolina	13	"Light in the Hallway"	Safe

=== Top 5 – Carrie Underwood (May 15) ===
Carrie Underwood served as a guest mentor this week. Each contestant performed two songs this week: one song from her discography and one song of their choice. Contestants are listed in the order they performed.

Top 5 (May 15)
Contestant	Order	Song	Result
HunterGirl	1	"Undo It"	Safe
HunterGirl	7	"Girl Crush"	Safe
Leah Marlene	2	"I'll Stand by You"	Safe
Leah Marlene	6	"Separate Ways (Worlds Apart)"	Safe
Fritz Hager	3	"I Wanna Remember"	Eliminated
Fritz Hager	8	"Youngblood"	Eliminated
Noah Thompson	4	"So Small"	Safe
Noah Thompson	10	"Working Man"	Safe
Nicolina	5	"Blown Away"	Eliminated
Nicolina	9	"All I Ask"	Eliminated

Non-competition performance
Performer	Song
Finneas	"Naked"

=== Top 3 – Finale (May 22) ===
Each contestant performed two songs this week–one song from the Bruce Springsteen discography and their winner's single–before the contestant who had the fewest votes up to that point was eliminated, thereby finishing in third place. The remaining two contestants performed one last song as voting continued. Contestants are listed in the order they performed.

Top 3 (May 22)
Contestant	Order	Song	Result
Leah Marlene	1	"Cover Me"	Third place
Leah Marlene	4	"Flowers"	Third place
HunterGirl	2	"Dancing in the Dark"	Runner-up
HunterGirl	6	"Red Bird"	Runner-up
HunterGirl	8	"Riot"	Runner-up
Noah Thompson	3	"I'm on Fire"	Winner
Noah Thompson	5	"One Day Tonight"	Winner
Noah Thompson	7	"Stay"	Winner

Non-competition performances
Performers	Song
Top 10 with Flo Rida	"Good Feeling"
Jay with Earth, Wind & Fire	"Shining Star" "Let's Groove" "September"
Mike Parker with Deana Carter	"Strawberry Wine"
Lady K with Ben Platt	"Take Me to the Pilot"
Emyrson Flora with Gabby Barrett and Cade Foehner	"Pick Me Up" "The Good Ones"
Top 10 with Tai Verdes	"A-O-K"
Nicolina with Sara Bareilles	"She Used to Be Mine"
Katy Perry and Thomas Rhett	"Where We Started"
Fritz Hager with James Arthur	"Can I Be Him"
Christian Guardino with Michael Bublé	"Smile"
Noah Thompson with Melissa Etheridge	"I'm the Only One"
Top 10 with Lionel Richie	"You Are"
Emyrson Flora, Jay, Leah Marlene, and Nicolina with Ben Platt and Sara Bareilles	"Grow as We Go"
Leah Marlene with Katy Perry	"Firework"
HunterGirl with Luke Bryan	"I Told You So"
Noah Thompson	"One Day Tonight"

== Elimination chart ==
Color key:

Winner
Runner-up
Third place
Did not perform
Saved by the public
Saved by the judges
Eliminated
Withdrew

American Idol (season 20) - Eliminations
Contestant	Pl.	Top 24		Top 20	Top 14	Top 11	Top 10	Top 7	Top 5	Finale
Contestant	Pl.	4/10	4/11	4/17	4/24	4/25	5/1	5/8	5/15	5/22
Noah Thompson	1	N/A	Safe	Safe	Safe	Safe	Safe	Safe	Safe	Winner
HunterGirl	2	Safe	N/A	Safe	Safe	Safe	Safe	Safe	Safe	Runner-up
Leah Marlene	3	N/A	Safe	Safe	Safe	Safe	Safe	Safe	Safe	Third Place
Fritz Hager	4	N/A	Safe	Safe	Safe	Safe	Safe	Safe	Eliminated	
Nicolina	4	Safe	N/A	Safe	Safe	Safe	Safe	Safe	Eliminated	
Christian Guardino	6	N/A	Safe	Safe	Safe	Safe	Safe	Eliminated		
Jay	6	Safe	N/A	Saved	Safe	Safe	Safe	Eliminated		
Emyrson Flora	8	Safe	N/A	Safe	Safe	Safe	Eliminated			
Lady K	8	N/A	Safe	Safe	Safe	Saved	Eliminated			
Mike Parker	8	Safe	N/A	Saved	Safe	Safe	Eliminated			
Tristen Gressett	11	Safe	N/A	Saved	Safe	Eliminated				
Dan Marshall	12	Safe	N/A	Safe	Eliminated					
Ava Maybee	12	N/A	Safe	Safe	Eliminated					
Allegra Miles	12	N/A	Safe	Saved	Eliminated					
Cadence Baker		N/A	Safe	Eliminated						
Katyrah Love		N/A	Safe	Eliminated						
Jacob Moran		Safe	N/A	Eliminated						
Elli Rowe		Safe	N/A	Eliminated						
Sage		Safe	N/A	Eliminated						
Cameron Whitcomb		N/A	Safe	Eliminated						
Sir Blayke		N/A	Eliminated							
Danielle Finn		Eliminated								
Scarlet		Eliminated								
Kenedi Anderson		N/A	Withdrew (Note: Kenedi Anderson withdrew from the competition for personal reasons.)							

== Ratings ==
Viewership and ratings per episode of American Idol season 20
No.	Title	Air date	Timeslot (ET)	Rating/share (18–49)	Viewers (millions)	DVR (18–49)	DVR viewers (millions)	Total (18–49)	Total viewers (millions)
1	"Auditions, Part 1"	February 27, 2022	Sunday 8:00 p.m.	0.9/7	6.30	0.2	1.17	1.1	7.47 (Note: Live+7 ratings were unavailable, so Live+3 ratings have been used instead.)
2	"Auditions, Part 2"	March 6, 2022	Sunday 8:00 p.m.	1.1/8	6.57	0.3	1.55	1.4	8.12
3	"Auditions, Part 3"	March 13, 2022	Sunday 8:00 p.m.	1.0/7	6.64	0.3	1.42	1.2	8.05
4	"Auditions, Part 4"	March 20, 2022	Sunday 8:00 p.m.	0.7/5	5.40	0.3	1.47	1.0	6.87
5	"Auditions, Part 5"	March 21, 2022	Monday 8:00 p.m.	0.7/6	5.29	0.3	1.46	1.0	6.75
6	"Auditions, Part 5A"	March 28, 2022	Monday 12:18 a.m.	0.6/10	2.95	—N/a	—N/a	—N/a	—N/a
7	"Hollywood Week: Genre Challenge"	March 28, 2022	Monday 8:00 p.m.	0.7/6	5.66	0.3	1.47	1.0	7.13
8	"Hollywood Duets Challenge"	April 3, 2022	Sunday 8:00 p.m.	0.7/5	4.89	0.2	1.50	0.9	6.31
9	"Showstopper/Final Judgment"	April 4, 2022	Monday 8:00 p.m.	0.6/5	5.58	0.3	1.46	0.9	7.06
10	"Top 24 at Disney's Aulani Resort in Hawaii Part #1"	April 10, 2022	Sunday 8:00 p.m.	0.7/6	5.47	0.2	1.33	0.9	6.80
11	"Top 24 at Disney's Aulani Resort in Hawaii Part #2"	April 11, 2022	Monday 8:00 p.m.	0.7/6	5.31	0.2	1.23	0.8	6.43
12	"Season 20's Top 20"	April 17, 2022	Sunday 8:00 p.m.	0.7/6	5.27	0.2	1.37	0.9	6.64
13	"Top 14 Live Reveal"	April 18, 2022	Monday 8:00 p.m.	0.6/5	5.57	0.4	1.67	1.0	7.25
14	"Top 14"	April 24, 2022	Sunday 8:00 p.m.	0.8/7	5.88	0.4	1.51	1.2	7.29
15	"Judge's Song Contest"	April 25, 2022	Monday 8:00 p.m.	0.7/6	5.82	0.4	1.55	1.1	7.37
16	"Disney Night"	May 1, 2022	Sunday 8:00 p.m.	0.9/8	6.57	—N/a	—N/a	—N/a	—N/a
17	"The Great Idol Reunion"	May 2, 2022	Monday 8:00 p.m.	0.7/5	5.89	—N/a	—N/a	—N/a	—N/a
18	"Top 7"	May 8, 2022	Sunday 8:00 p.m.	0.8/6	5.52	0.1	1.28	0.9	6.80
19	"Top 5"	May 15, 2022	Sunday 8:00 p.m.	0.7/5	5.57	0.3	1.43	1.0	7.00
20	"Grand Finale"	May 22, 2022	Sunday 8:00 p.m.	0.8/6	6.49	—N/a	—N/a	—N/a	—N/a
