= Hammer Down (album) =

Studio album by The SteelDrivers
- Released: February 5, 2013
- Studio: Station West, Nashville, TN; The Cave, Nashville, TN; The NuttHouse Recording Studio, Sheffield, AL
- Genre: Country
- Length: 34:39
- Label: Rounder Records
- Producer: Luke Wooten; The SteelDrivers

The SteelDrivers chronology
Reckless (2010)	Hammer Down (2013)	The Muscle Shoals Recordings (2015)

Hammer Down is the third album from The Steeldrivers. It was released on February 5, 2013 by Rounder Records.

== Critical reception ==
Professional ratings
Review scores
Source	Rating
AllMusic	3.5/5 stars
My Kind of Country	A

AllMusic's review of Hammer Down says, "On their third album, The SteelDrivers continue to forge their own unique path in the world of bluegrass/acoustic music. They play music that sounds like bluegrass on the surface, but they usually eschew the high lonesome harmonies of traditional bluegrass for a more mainstream approach that often sounds like hardcore country gone acoustic." They give the album 3½ out of a possible five stars.

John Lawless reviews the album for Bluegrass Today. "Several of the songs on Hammer Down are contributions from founding members Chris Stapleton and Mike Henderson, both of whom have stepped down from active touring, but whose distinctive songwriting has helped define the group since their start in 2008. Compositions from Rogers and Nichols are also included."

The Washington Post writes, "On Hammer Down, the quintet's first album with its new lineup, the SteelDrivers stand out as one bluegrass group that embraces the genre's rough-and-tumble, working-class roots. The songs about alcohol, betrayal and violence feature vocals and solos raw enough to make it all credible."

PopMatters' Arnold Pan writes, "PopMatters Editor Sarah Zupko couldn't have been any more to the point when she wrote last year that, "As far as I’m concerned, Nashville's SteelDrivers are the finest neo-bluegrass group on the planet right now." So it shouldn't come as any surprise that the acclaimed, Grammy-nominated Americana act has kept its winning streak going with its third album Hammer Down."

Jay Minkin of No Depression writes, "The Nashville based quintet is one of the most heralded new bluegrass bands around. Since the release of their self-titled Lp (2008) and Reckless (2010), the SteelDrivers have been nominated for three Grammys, four International Bluegrass Music Association awards, and as an Emerging Artist of the Year from the Americana Music Association."

Donald Teplyske of Country Standard Time concludes his review by saying, "Hammer down, indeed."

Cybergrass' review states, "The SteelDrivers’ brand of bluegrass – intense, dark, poetic, and inescapably human – is a refreshing reminder of the timeless power of string band music, and is captured perfectly on the new Hammer Down."

My Kind of Country's review says, "Every song on the album was co-written by either a present or former SteelDriver, and lead vocalist Gary Nichols’ gruff but soulful voice is nicely complemented by the harmonies of fiddle player Tammy Rogers and bassist Mike Fleming. Many of the songs have a Celtic flavor to them, sounding a lot like some of the recordings that The Chieftains made with a variety of Nashville artists"

== Track listing ==
No.	Title	Writer(s)	Length
1.	"Shallow Grave"	Barry Billings; Gary Nichols	2:55
2.	"How Long Have I Been Your Fool"	Al Anderson; Tammy Rogers; Chris Stapleton	3:26
3.	"When You Don't Come Home"	Nichols; Tammy Rogers	3:02
4.	"I'll Be There"	Nichols; John Paul White	3:57
5.	"Burnin' the Woodshed Down"	Frances Specker Bradley; Nichols	3:25
6.	"Wearin' a Hole"	Mike Henderson	3:24
7.	"Lonesome Goodbye"	Mike Henderson; Stapleton	4:31
8.	"Hell on Wheels"	Rogers; Leslie Satcher	2:53
9.	"Cry No Mississippi"	Kris Bergness; Nichols; White	4:05
10.	"When I'm Gone"	Henderson; Stapleton	3:01
Total length:			34:39

== Musicians ==
- Richard Bailey – Banjo
- Mike Fleming – Bass, Vocals
- Tammy Rogers – Fiddle, Viola, Cello, Vocals
- Gary Nichols – Guitar, Vocals
- Brent Truitt – Mandolin, Bouzouki on "I'll Be There" and Guitar on "Burnin' the Woodshed Down"

== Production ==
- Booking – KCA
- Assistant Engineer – Kyle Manner
- Engineer (Editing, Assistant) – Gary Nichols
- Engineer (Mixing) – Luke Wooten
- Engineer (Recording) – Jimmy Nutt, John Caldwell
- Liner Notes – Juli Thanki
- Mastered By – Paul Blakemore
- Additional Mixing By – Brent Truitt, Kyle Manner
- Photography By – Mickey Dobo
- Producer – Luke Wooten, The SteelDrivers
- Additional Recording By, Additional Editing By – Brent Truitt
- Distributed By – Concord Music Group, Inc.
- Manufactured By – Concord Music Group, Inc.
- Recorded At – Station West
- Recorded At – The Cave, Nashville, TN
- Recorded At – The NuttHouse
- Edited At – The Cave, Nashville, TN
- Mastered At – CMG Mastering

Track information and credits verified from the album's liner notes. Some credits adapted from Discogs.
