= Tammy Rogers (album) =

Studio album by Tammy Rogers
- Released: January 17, 1996
- Studios: The Boardroom; Midtown
- Genre: Country
- Length: 44:13
- Label: Dead Reckoning
- Producers: Harry stinson; Tammy Rogers

Tammy Rogers chronology
In the Red (With Don Heffington) (1995)	Tammy Rogers (1996)	The Speed of Love (1999)

Professional ratings
Review scores
Source	Rating
Entertainment Weekly	B+

Tammy Rogers is the solo debut album by Grammy winning member of The SteelDrivers, Tammy Rogers. The album was released by Rogers' own label, Dead Reckoning Records, which was formed with fellow musicians Kieran Kane, Kevin Welch, Mike Henderson and Harry Stinson, all of which appear on this album.

== Critical reception ==
Norm Rosenfield of Country Standard Time says, "This album may have little chance of reaching the audience of an Alison Krauss, but is well worth the visit."

Beverly Greenfield of the Folk & Acoustic Music Exchange begins her review with, "Tammy Rogers' self-titled release on Dead Reckoning is ambitious and smart, a mixed plate of American country music with British pop and Irish fiddle flavors as well."

Tony Scherman of Entertainment Weekly says of the album, "some high points: Mike Henderson’s raucous electric guitar on "You Can't Buy a Ticket to Heaven," and Rogers' beautiful arrangements for her violin and viola on "Another Day.""

== Track listing ==
All tracks are written by Tammy Rogers, unless otherwise noted.

No.	Title	Writer(s)	Length
1.	"Coming Home"	Tammy Rogers; Jeff King	2:07
2.	"Never Far Away"		3:43
3.	"Oh Heartache"		3:10
4.	"Walls"		4:21
5.	"Come Out and Play"	Tammy Rogers; Alison Prestwood	3:15
6.	"Nothing at All"		3:37
7.	"You Will Miss Me"		4:08
8.	"You Can't Buy a Ticket to Heaven"	Tammy Rogers; Victoria Williams	3:53
9.	"On A Night Like Tonight"	Tammy Rogers; Alison Prestwood; Pat Buchanan	3:00
10.	"Let's Leave It Like That"	Tammy Rogers; Alison Prestwood	4:02
11.	"Something Old, Something New"	Tammy Rogers; Tony Harrell	2:15
12.	"Another Day"	Tammy Rogers; Victoria Williams	3:20
13.	"There is a Fountain" (Has 5:02 of silence at end)	William Cowper	1:06
14.	"Untitled Instrumental" (Hidden track)		2:16
Total length:			44:13

== Musicians ==
- Tammy Rogers – Hardanger Fiddle (Track 1), Acoustic Guitar (Track 2, 3, 4, 9), Fiddle (Track 3, 8), Electric Guitar (Track 5), String Quartet (Track 7), Viola (Track 10, 11, 12, 13), Violin (Track 10, 11, 13)
- Jeff King – Acoustic Guitar (Track 1, 7), Bouzouki (Track 4), Nylon String Guitar (Track 6), Electric Guitar (Track 10)
- Kieran Kane – Snare and Bass Drum (Track 1), Mandolin (Track 2, 3, 8, 9), Acoustic Guitar (Track 9)
- Harry Stinson – Drums (Track 2, 3, 5, 7, 8, 9, 10), Background Vocals (Track 2, 5, 8, 9), Tambourine (Track 3, 4, 8, 9), Percussion (Track 5), Acoustic Guitar (Track 9)
- Kevin Welch – Acoustic Guitar (Track 2, 3, 5, 8)
- Tim Lauer – Accordion (Track 2, 4), Pump Organ (Track 4)
- Jerry Douglas – Dobro (Track 2, 4)
- Glenn Worf – Bass (Track 3, 4)
- Buddy Miller – Background Vocals (Track 3, 8), Electric Guitar (Track 5, 8), Acoustic Guitar (Track 10)
- Julie Miller – Background Vocals (Track 3, 8)
- Emmylou Harris – Background Vocals (Track 4)
- Alison Prestwood – Bass (Track 5, 6, 8, 9, 10)
- Kim Richey – Background Vocals (Track 5)
- Walt Aldridge – Electric Sitar, Bouzouki, Acoustic Guitar (Track 5)
- Tamaneethoven – String Trio (Track 6)
- Mike Brignardello – Bass (Track 7, 12)
- Pat Buchanan – Electric Guitar (Track 7), Acoustic Guitar (Track 12)
- Tony Harrel – Piano (Track 7, 11, 12), Organ (Track 10)
- Marvin Etzioni – Mandolin (Track 7)
- Andrew Williams – Background Vocals (Track 7), Pump Organ (Track 7)
- David Williams – Background Vocals (Track 7)
- Victoria Williams – Background Vocals (Track 7, 8, 12), Dulcimer (Track 12)
- Fats Kaplin – Accordion (Track 8), Steel Guitar (Track 9)
- Mike Henderson – Electric Guitar (Track 8, 9)
- Larry Marrs – Background Vocals (Track 9)
- Jim Lauderdale – Background Vocals (Track 10)

== Production ==
- Produced by Harry Stinson & Tammy Rogers
- Mastered by Dave Shipley
- Engineered by Brian David Willis at The Boardroom, December 9 & 10, 1995
- Engineered by Herbin Tassin at Midtown on November 11, 1995
- 2nd Engineer by Matt Srobodny at Midtown on November 11, 1995,

Track information and credits verified from the album's liner notes and from the official website for the album.
