= Lawrence County High School (Kentucky) =

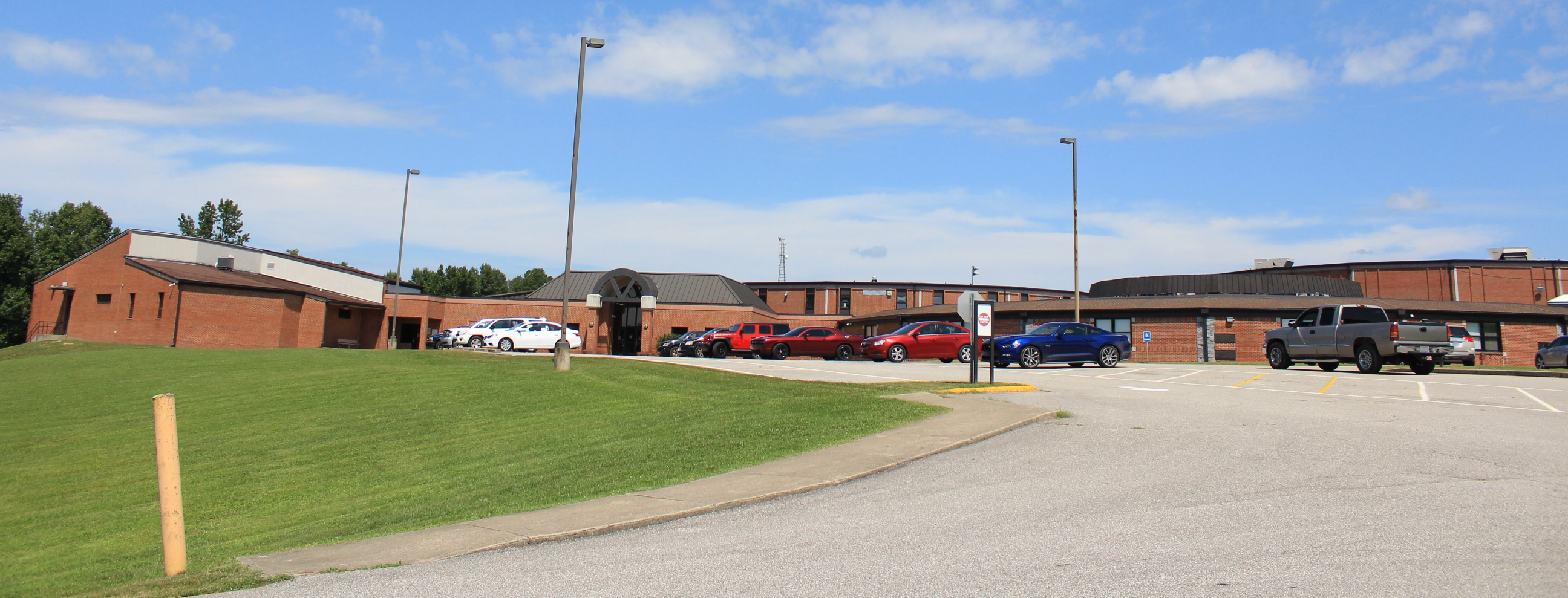

Location
- 100 Bulldog Lane; Louisa, KY 41230; United States; 38.09768°N 82.60587°W

Information
- Type: Public high school
- Established: 1977
- School district: 16
- Principal: Myram Brady
- Teaching staff: 55.00 (FTE)
- Grades: 9-12
- Enrollment: 754 (2023–2024)
- Student to teacher ratio: 13.71
- Campus: Rural
- Colors: Red, Black and Gray
- Mascot: Bulldog

Lawrence County High School is a public high school in Louisa, Kentucky located at 100 Bulldog Lane, Louisa, KY 41230.

== History ==
Lawrence County High School was established in September 1977. It shares its name with the county in which it is located, and offers public education to students of Lawrence County, Kentucky, in grades 9–12.

Students attending LCHS are filtered in from one middle school, two elementary-middle schools, and one private Christian school from across Lawrence County. The school is located next to the Lawrence County Board of Education and Lawrence County Community Center.

In 2021, Governor Andy Beshear announced that Lawrence County High School would receive $9,280,350 from the American Rescue Plan Act for the expansion and renovation of the school's vocational department. Improvements are anticipated for the areas of agricultural education, coal technology, engineering, construction, and carpentry as well the addition of a computer science pathway and a distance learning lab.

== Notable alumni ==
- Jason Michael – NFL tight end coach for the Philadelphia Eagles
- Gerad Parker – Offensive coordinator and tight end coach at Notre Dame. Former interim head football coach at Purdue.
- Chandler Shepherd – Major League pitcher for the Baltimore Orioles
- Jackson Feltner – Major League first baseman for the Arizona Diamondbacks.
- Noah Thompson – American Idol season 20 winner
- Tyler Childers – American singer/songwriter
