= Caleb Lee Hutchinson =

American singer-songwriter

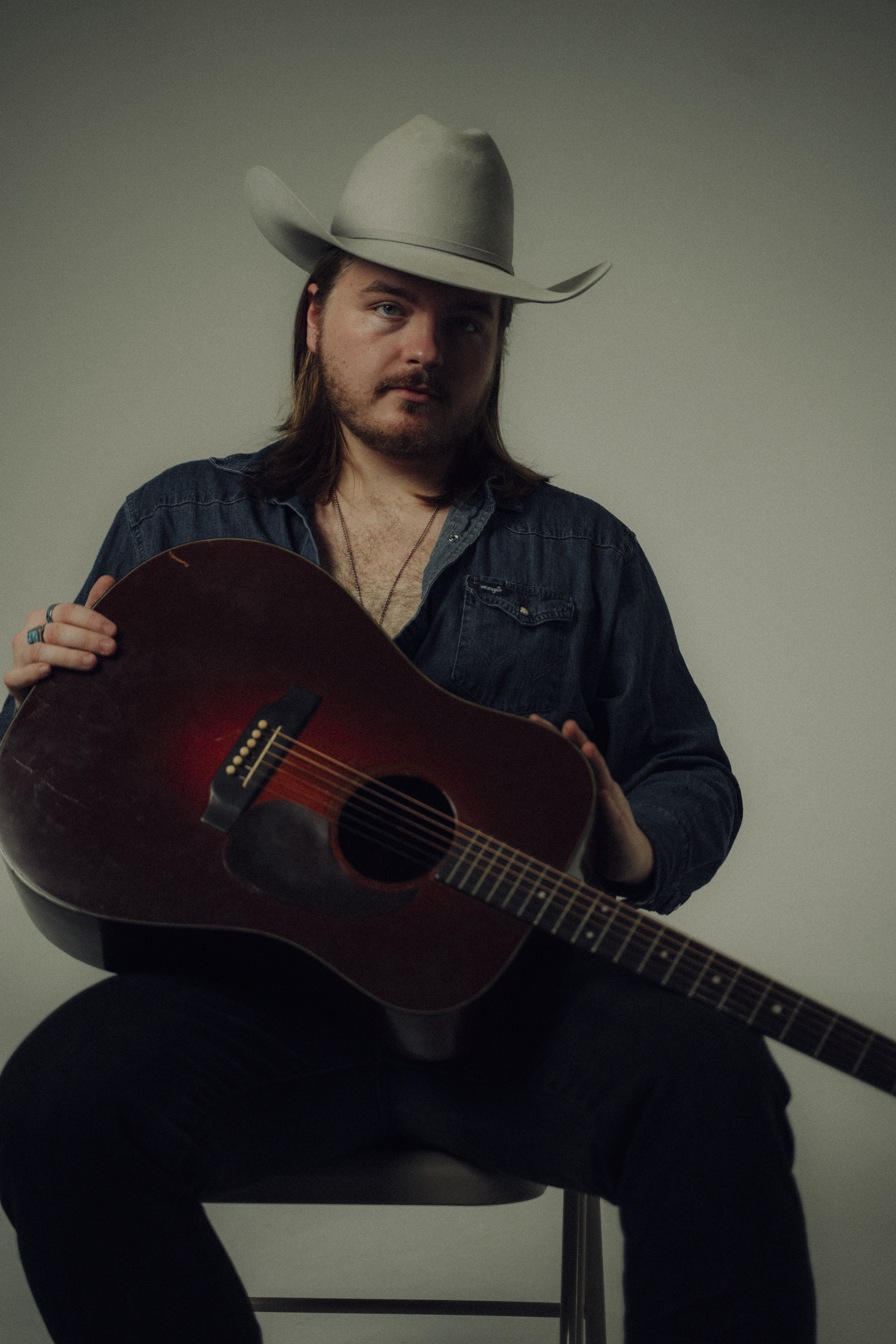
- Caleb Lee Hutchinson

Background information
- Born: March 2, 1999 (aged 13); Dallas, Georgia, United States
- Genre: Country
- Occupation: Singer
- Years active: 2016–present
- Website: calebleehutchinson.com

Caleb Lee Hutchinson (born March 2, 1999) is an American singer-songwriter, and runner-up on the sixteenth season of American Idol.

== Early life ==
Caleb Lee Hutchinson was born in Dallas, Georgia, to William and Piper Hutchinson. He has a brother Tyler. He started playing guitar when he was 12, attended South Paulding High School, and graduated in 2017. In 2015, at age 16, Hutchinson appeared on the ninth season of The Voice auditioning with "The Dance", but none of the presiding judges Adam Levine, Gwen Stefani, Pharrell Williams and Blake Shelton turned their chair, and Hutchinson was eliminated from the show.

== American Idol ==
In 2018, he auditioned to season 16 of American Idol with the song "If It Hadn't Been for Love" from The SteelDrivers. All three judges Lionel Richie, Katy Perry and Luke Bryan voted "yes" for him to continue. During the season, he sang "Die a Happy Man" (Top 24), "Midnight Train to Memphis" (Top 14), "You've Got a Friend in Me" (Top 10), "When Doves Cry and "Amazed" (Top 7), "So Small" and "Stars in Alabama" (Top 5) qualifying for the shows' finale. On May 20, 2018, he performed "Don't Close Your Eyes", "Folsom Prison Blues" and his single was "Johnny Cash Heart" finishing runner-up to winner Maddie Poppe.

From the time he first appeared on the show until the end of the season he lost about 70 pounds. During the final, Caleb declared that he and winner Maddie Poppe were dating.

Episode	Theme	Song Choice	Original Artist	Order #	Result
Audition	Auditioner's Choice	If It Hadn't Been for Love	The SteelDrivers	N/A	Advanced
Top 24 Solo/Duet	Contestant's Choice	Die a Happy Man Meant to Be (with Bebe Rexha)	Thomas Rhett Bebe Rexha	1	Advanced
Top 14	Contestant's Choice Victory Song	Midnight Train to Memphis Gettin' You Home	Chris Stapleton Chris Young	1 9	Safe
Top 10	Disney	You've Got a Friend in Me	Randy Newman and Lyle Lovett	8	Safe
Top 7	Prince Year You Were Born	When Doves Cry Amazed	Prince Lonestar	14 6	Safe
Top 5	Carrie Underwood Mother's Day	So Small Stars in Alabama	Carrie Underwood Jamey Johnson	4 9	Safe
Finale	Winner's Single Reprise Song Hometown Decision	Johnny Cash Heart Don't Close Your Eyes Folsom Prison Blues	Caleb Lee Hutchinson Keith Whitley Johnny Cash	1 4 7	Runner-up

== Music career ==
Hutchinson's song on American Idol, "Johnny Cash Heart", was released after his performance on the show. The song charted at number 16 on the Country Digital Song Sales chart on its first week of release.

On 28 June 2019, Hutchinson released a self-titled EP, produced by Kristian Bush of Sugarland. Two songs from the EP, "Left of Me" and a cover of Post Malone's song "Better Now" were first released in January 2019.

== Discography ==
=== Albums ===
Year	Title
2023	Southern Galactic
2026	Long Line of Losers

=== Extended plays ===
Title	EP details
Caleb Lee Hutchinson	Release Date: June 28, 2019
Slot Machine Syndrome	Release Date: September 17, 2021
Songs I'll Never Play Again	Release Date: October 28, 2022

=== Singles ===
Year	Title	Album
2018	"Johnny Cash Heart"	Non-album single
2019	"Better Now"	Non-album single
2019	"Left of Me"	Non-album single
2021	"Who I Am"	Non-album single
2021	"Slot Machine Syndrome"	Non-album single
2023	"Silverado"	Southern Galactic
2023	"I Miss You"	Southern Galactic
2024	"White Dress" ft. Remo Drive	Mercy (Deluxe)
2025	"One Trick Pony"	Non-album Single
