= The Muscle Shoals Recordings =

Studio album by The SteelDrivers
- Released: June 16, 2015
- Genre: Bluegrass
- Length: 36:25
- Label: Rounder
- Producer: The SteelDrivers

The SteelDrivers chronology
Hammer Down (2012)	The Muscle Shoals Recordings (2015)	Bad for You (2020)

The Muscle Shoals Recordings is an album by The SteelDrivers. It was released on Rounder Records on June 16, 2015. It earned the group a Grammy Award for Best Bluegrass Album.

== Critical reception ==
Professional ratings
Review scores
Source	Rating
AllMusic	3.5/5 stars
American Songwriter	3.5/5 stars

Mark Deming of AllMusic concludes his review with, "the music speaks for itself, and what it says is eloquent and deeply pleasing".

Hal Horowitz of American Songwriter writes, "The album’s title implies a wider expansion of the SteelDrivers’ already elastic sound that doesn't appear, yet the group has rarely sounded more focused or passionate. That makes The Muscle Shoals Recordings another notable entry into the group's already distinctive catalog".

Jonathan Frahm of PopMatters concludes his review with, "not unlike John Henry, they’re fighting an uphill battle against the digitization of the industry, with their bare hands and organic instrumentation as their only weapons. They do it so darn well that they might just win".

Kelly McCartney of Folk Alley writes, "It's a thoroughly supple, occasionally somber set, but even the darker hues have a fluidity that keep them from getting too bogged down in their own self-importance".

Michael McDade of No Depression says, "This album really puts The Steeldrivers back on the map. They’ve got their great songs about people doing bad things, but now they’ve mixed that with having a great understanding what their lead man’s strengths are as a singer".

Chuck Dauphin of Billboard writes, "The band has just released their second disc with Nichols -- The Muscle Shoals Recordings -- which debuted at No. 1 on the Billboard Bluegrass Albums chart last week. He (Gary Nichols) said the album has the potential to be very special for the group".

Donald Teplyske of Country Standard Time begins his review with, "The SteelDrivers are a dynamic, driving bluegrass band, a five-piece with a sound and an approach completely their own".

== Track listing ==
No.	Title	Writer(s)	Length
1.	"Long Way Down"	Liz Hengber; Tammy Rogers; Jerry Salley	3:44
2.	"Drinkin' Alone"	Jay Knowles; Chris Stapleton	2:41
3.	"Ashes of Yesterday"	Mike Henderson; Rogers	3:13
4.	"Day Before Temptation"	Catt Gravitt; Gary Nichols	3:11
5.	"Here She Goes"	Dylan LeBlanc; Nichols	3:26
6.	"California Chainsaw"	Richard Bailey	2:47
7.	"Hangin' Around"	Nichols	2:52
8.	"Brother John"	Barry Billings; Nichols	3:41
9.	"Six Feet Away"	Rogers; Salley	3:07
10.	"Too Much"	Bonnie Lowery; Nichols	3:43
11.	"River Runs Red"	Henberg; Rogers; Salley	4:00
Total length:			36:25

== Chart performance ==
Chart (2015)	Peak position
US Top Bluegrass Albums (Billboard)	1
US Heatseekers Albums (Billboard)	5

== Credits and personnel ==
Musicians

- Tammy Rogers – Fiddle, Viola, Vocals
- Gary Nichols – Acoustic Guitar, Baritone Guitar (6-String), Baritone Guitar (8-String), Vocals
- Richard Bailey – Banjo
- Mike Fleming – Bass, Vocals
- Brent Truitt – Mandolin
- Jason Isbell – Slide Guitar (Tracks 3, 8)

Production

- Producer – The SteelDrivers
- Producer – Jason Isbell (Tracks 5, 8)
- Additional Engineering and Editing – Chris Latham
- Assistant Editing And Mixing Engineer – Gary Nichols
- Assistant Engineer – Cody Simmons
- Recorded By, Mixed By – Jimmy Nutt
- Mastered By – Paul Blakemore
- Photography – Robert Rausch
- Cover Design – Jimmy Hole
- Package Design – Carrie Smith
- Booking – Conway Entertainment
- Liner Notes – Peter Cooper
- Artist Representation/Management – Wortman Works

Track information and credits verified from the album's liner notes. Some credits adapted from Discogs.
