= Tammy Rogers =

American singer-songwriter

- Born: 1966 (age 59–60)
- Origin: Tennessee, US
- Genres: Bluegrass, Country
- Occupations: Singer-songwriter, musician
- Instruments: Vocals, fiddle, violin, viola, cello, mandolin, guitar, banjo
- Years active: 199x-present
- Label: Dead Reckoning
- Website: tammyrogers.com

Tammy Rogers (born 1966) is an American country music singer, songwriter and musician. In addition to releasing three albums on the Dead Reckoning Records label (which she founded with Kieran Kane), she is also a founding member of the Grammy Award winning bluegrass group The SteelDrivers and works as a studio musician, primarily on fiddle, violin and viola. She also wrote "A Little Gasoline", a single released by Terri Clark from her album Fearless.

== Early life ==
Although Tammy Rogers was born in Tennessee, she was raised in Irving, Texas. Tammy was a member of the Texas All-State orchestra for four consecutive years, a feat as of 2023 has not been repeated. A graduate of Nimitz High School 1983 and later Belmont University, she joined Patty Loveless' backing band after graduation, then moved on to back Trisha Yearwood.

== Career ==
In the mid-1990s Rogers began working as a session musician, working with artists such as Kieran Kane (formerly of The O'Kanes). Kane and Rogers, along with Harry Stinson and Kevin Welch, founded Dead Reckoning Records in 1995. Rogers and Dean Miller co-wrote Terri Clark's 2000 single "A Little Gasoline".

Rogers has contributed to most of Buddy Miller's albums, and she cites him as a favorite artist.

Her first album, In the Red (with Don Heffington), was released in 1995, followed by a self-titled album in 1996 and Speed of Love in 1999.

In 2008, she helped to found the bluegrass band The SteelDrivers on fiddle and harmony vocals. The band signed to Rounder Records and released a self-titled debut in 2008. The album peaked at No. 57 on the U.S. Billboard Top Country Albums chart. The group was nominated for a Grammy Award in 2009 for Best Country Performance by a Duo or Group with Vocals for their song "Blue Side of the Mountain." In 2010, the group received two nominations for its second album, Reckless. The album has been nominated for both Best Bluegrass Album and Best Country Performance by a Duo or Group with Vocal for the song "Where Rainbows Never Die."

== Musical styles and critical reception ==
Rogers' debut album received a four-star review from Allmusic critic Richard Foss, who said that it showed country and bluegrass influences with "delightful twists". Her self-titled second album was also met with favorable reviews. Country Standard Time critic Norm Rosenfield also described Tammy Rogers favorably, with his review noting the multiple guest musicians and prominent bluegrass influence. Tony Scherman of Entertainment Weekly gave the album a B+ rating, saying that Rogers sounded like a "less-ethereal Alison Krauss". Country Standard Time critic Dan Williams also compared Rogers to Krauss in his review of The Speed of Love, saying that she sounded like Krauss' "less tradition-bound older sister", and that her "achingly sweet soprano" made even the weaker tracks "consistently listenable".

== Discography ==
=== Solo ===
- 1995: In the Red (Dead Reckoning) with Don Heffington
- 1996: Tammy Rogers (Dead Reckoning)
- 1999: The Speed of Love (Dead Reckoning)

=== With the Steeldrivers ===
- 2008: The Steeldrivers - The Steeldrivers (Rounder)
- 2010: The Steeldrivers - Reckless (Rounder)
- 2011: Bailey & Rogers - Banjo & Fiddle (Richard Bailey Music)
- 2012: The Steeldrivers - Hammer Down (Rounder)
- 2015: The Steeldrivers - The Muscle Shoals Recordings (Rounder)
- 2020: The Steeldrivers - Bad For You (Rounder)
- 2023: The Steeldrivers - Tougher Than Nails (Gaither Music Group LLC)

=== With Buddy and Julie Miller ===
- 1995: Buddy Miller - Your Love and Other Lies (Hightone)
- 1996: Julie Miller - Invisible Girl (Hightone)
- 1997: Buddy Miller - Poison Love (Hightone)
- 1997: Julie Miller - Blue Pony (Hightone)
- 1999: Buddy Miller - Cruel Moon (Hightone)
- 2001: Buddy and Julie Miller - Buddy & Julie Miller (Hightone)
- 2002: Buddy Miller - Midnight and Lonesome (Hightone)
- 2004: Buddy Miller - Universal United House of Prayer (New West)

=== As Guest Musician ===
- 1993: Charlie Major - The Other Side (Arista)
- 1994: Betsy - Rough Around the Edges (NorthSouth)
- 1994: Jim Lauderdale - Pretty Close to the Truth (Atlantic)
- 1994: Peter Case - Sings Like Hell (Vanguard)
- 1994: Victoria Williams - Loose (Mammoth)
- 1995: The Jayhawks - Tomorrow the Green Grass (American)
- 1995: Kieran Kane - Dead Rekoning (Dead Reckoning)
- 1996: Doug Powell - Ballad of the Tin Men (Mercury)
- 1996: Greg Trooper - Noises in the Hallway (D'Ville)
- 1997: The Dead Reckoners - A Night of Reckoning (Dead Reckoning)
- 1997: Jeff Finlin - Highway Diaries (Little Dog / Mercury)
- 1997: Matraca Berg - Sunday Morning to Saturday Night (Rising Tide)
- 1998: Kieran Kane - Six Months, No Sun (Dead Reckoning)
- 1998: Stonehill - Thirst (Brentwood)
- 1999: Geoff Moore - Geoff Moore (ForeFront)
- 1999: Phil Madeira - Three Horse Shoes (Silent Planet)
- 2000: Bill Mallonee and Vigilantes of Love - Audible Sigh (Compass)
- 2000: Todd Snider - Happy to be Here (Oh Boy)
- 2001: Susan Werner - New Non-Fiction (self-released)
- 2002: All Star United - Revolution (Furious?)
- 2002: BlackHawk - Spirit Dancer (Columbia)
- 2002: Corb Lund - Five Dollar Bill (Stony Plain)
- 2002: Victoria Williams - Sings Some Ol’ Songs (Dualtone)
- 2003: Duane Jarvis - Delicious (Slewfoot)
- 2004: Kim Carnes - Chasin' Wild Trains (Spark Dawg)
- 2004: Rosie Flores - Single Rose (Durango Rose)
- 2006: Adam Gregory - Adam Gregory (Mensa)
- 2006: The Grassmasters - Elvis Grass (Synergy)
- 2006: India.Arie - Testimony: Vol. 1, Life & Relationship (Motown)
- 2006: Jon Christopher Davis - Jon Christopher Davis (Palo Duro)
- 2007: Stephen Simmons - Something In Between (Americana)
- 2009: Gianna - Something True (Expansion)
- 2010: Capt. Kane & Big Trouble - Big Trouble (ABC Tunes)
- 2012: Chris Knight - Little Victories (Drifter's Church)
- 2012: Malcolm Holcombe - Down the River (Gypsy Eyes)
- 2013: Eric Church - Sinners Like Me (Capitol Nashville)
- 2018: Michael Kelsh - Harmony Sovereign (Sonoita Records) - violin and mandolin

== Awards and nominations ==
Year	Nominee / work	Award	Result
2009	"Blue Side of the Mountain"	Best Country Performance by a Duo or Group with Vocal	Nominated
2011	Reckless	Best Bluegrass Album	Nominated
2011	"Where Rainbows Never Die"	Best Country Performance by a Duo or Group with Vocal	Nominated
2015	The Muscle Shoals Recordings	Best Bluegrass Album	Won
