= The Speed of Love =

Studio album by Tammy Rogers
- Released: April 6, 1999
- Studio: Dead Aunt Thelma's, Nashville, Tennessee
- Genre: Country
- Length: 54:12
- Label: Dead Reckoning Records

Tammy Rogers chronology
Tammy Rogers (1996)	The Speed of Love (1999)	Cruel Moon (with Buddy & Julie Miller) (1999)

The Speed of Love is the third solo album by Tammy Rogers, released April 6, 1999. Jason Ankeny's biography of Tammy Rogers on AllMusic mentions that she was a member of Patty Loveless' backing band, which she followed with a stint backing Trisha Yearwood before becoming one of the first members of Kieran Kane's Dead Reckoning label.

== Critical reception ==
Dan Williams of Country Standard Time concludes his review with, "This is sturdy and consistently listenable - an honest record that serves as a welcome antidote to the many freeze-dried ingenues spilling out of Music Row of late."

Eric Thom of Exclaim writes, "Nashville’s most in-demand session fiddle player not only unleashes her seasoned songwriting ability on this release, but she’ll lay your soul to waste with her angelic singing voice as well."

== Track listing ==
No.	Title	Writer(s)	Length
1.	"Yesterday's Kisses"	Tammy Rogers; Tom Douglas	4:03
2.	"We Know Love"	Tammy Rogers	3:23
3.	"Between a Rock and a Soft Place"	Tammy Rogers; Sherry Rich	3:25
4.	"Rescue Me"	Tammy Rogers; Alison Prestwood; Pat Buchanan	4:54
5.	"Thought You Should Know"	Tammy Rogers; Pat Buchanan	4:41
6.	"The Speed of Love"	Tammy Rogers; Kent Agee	4:22
7.	"The Train"	Tammy Rogers	4:06
8.	"I'm Turning Back"	Tammy Rogers	4:11
9.	"If That's Not Real Love"	Tammy Rogers; Alison Prestwood; Pat Buchanan	4:10
10.	"How Can I Lose?"	Tammy Rogers; Alison Prestwood; Pat Buchanan	3:06
11.	"A Little More in Love"	Tammy Rogers; Alison Prestwood; Pat Buchanan	3:49
12.	"Going For A Drive"	Tammy Rogers; Pat Buchanan	3:26
13.	"Mama's Got Some Money"	Tammy Rogers	2:50
14.	"Untitled Hidden Track" (Begins at 7:53 into track 13)		3:46
Total length:			54:12

== Musicians ==
- Tammy Rogers: Vocals, Fiddle, Mandolin, Melodica, Strings
- Harry Stinson: Drums, Percussion, Vocals
- Alison Prestwood: Electric Bass
- Glenn Worf: Upright Bass
- Jeff King: Electric Guitars, Acoustic Guitars
- Pat Buchanan: Acoustic Guitars
- Kieran Kane: Octave Mandolin, Acoustic Guitars
- Dan Dugmore: Steel Guitar, Electric Guitar
- Brian David Willis: Tambourine

== Production ==
- Recorded at Dead Aunt Thelma's, Nashville, Tennessee by Brian David Willis
- Overdubs recorded at Way Out Wyoming, Nashville, Tennessee by Tammy Rogers and Jeff King
- Mixed at Dead Aunt Thelma's by Young Brian

All track information and credits were verified from the CD liner notes. and from the official website for the album.
