= Reckless (SteelDrivers album) =

Studio album by The SteelDrivers
- Released: September 7, 2010
- Studio: Ocean Way, Nashville
- Genre: Country
- Length: 46:54
- Label: Rounder Records
- Producer: Luke Wooten

The SteelDrivers chronology
The SteelDrivers (2008)	Reckless (2010)	Hammer Down (2013)

Reckless is the second album by the SteelDrivers, released on September 7, 2010, by Rounder Records.

== Critical reception ==
Professional ratings
Review scores
Source	Rating
AllMusic	4/5 stars
Slant Magazine	4/5 stars
American Songwriter	4/5 stars

AllMusic's review states that "The Steeldrivers may play traditional bluegrass, but they do it with a style that's informed by outlaw country and rock & roll attitude."

Jonathan Keefe of Slant Magazine writes, "What the SteelDrivers did so well on their self-titled debut, and what they build on throughout Reckless, is incorporate a heavy dollop of traditional blues and Southern soul into their brand of bluegrass."

American Songwriter writes that "it’s nice to know that Nashville is capable of putting out something besides more bad pop. Produced by Luke Wooten, whose production on Leslie Satcher’s Love Letters was the high point of Nashville music in 2000. Highly recommended, especially since you probably won’t hear this band in this incarnation again."

John Lupton of Country Standard Time begins his review with, "Following the release of their self-titled debut two years ago, the Nashville-based SteelDrivers quickly developed a following for their distinctive blend of bluegrass and blues with a dash of Southern rock"

== Track listing ==
All tracks are written by Mike Henderson and Chris Stapleton, except "Good Corn Liquor" by Chris Stapleton and Ronnie Bowman.

No.	Title	Length
1.	"The Reckless Side of Me"	3:13
2.	"Good Corn Liquor"	3:40
3.	"Where Rainbows Never Die"	3:49
4.	"The Price"	4:09
5.	"Can You Run"	4:58
6.	"Peacemaker"	4:03
7.	"You Put the Hurt On Me"	3:45
8.	"Midnight on the Mountain"	2:41
9.	"Guitars, Whiskey, Guns and Knives"	2:35
10.	"Angel of the Night"	4:00
11.	"Higher Than the Wall"	3:47
12.	"Ghosts of Mississippi"	6:14
Total length:		46:54

== Musicians ==
- Richard Bailey – banjo
- Mike Fleming – bass, vocals
- Tammy Rogers – fiddle, viola, vocals
- Chris Stapleton – guitar, vocals
- Mike Henderson – mandolin, resonator guitar, harmonica

== Production ==
- Photography by Mickey Dobo
- Producer – Luke Wooten, The SteelDrivers
- Assistant production manager – Donna Winklmann
- Recorded by Luke Wooten at Ocean Way, Nashville, Tennessee
- Mixed and mastered by Luke Wooten at West/Wing/Station West
- Lacquer Cut by Anne-Marie Suenram, George Horn at Fantasy Studios
- Cover – Scott Billington
- Design – Rachel E. Sullivan
- Assistant engineer – P.J. French

Track information and credits verified from the album's liner notes.
