= HunterGirl =

American singer-songwriter

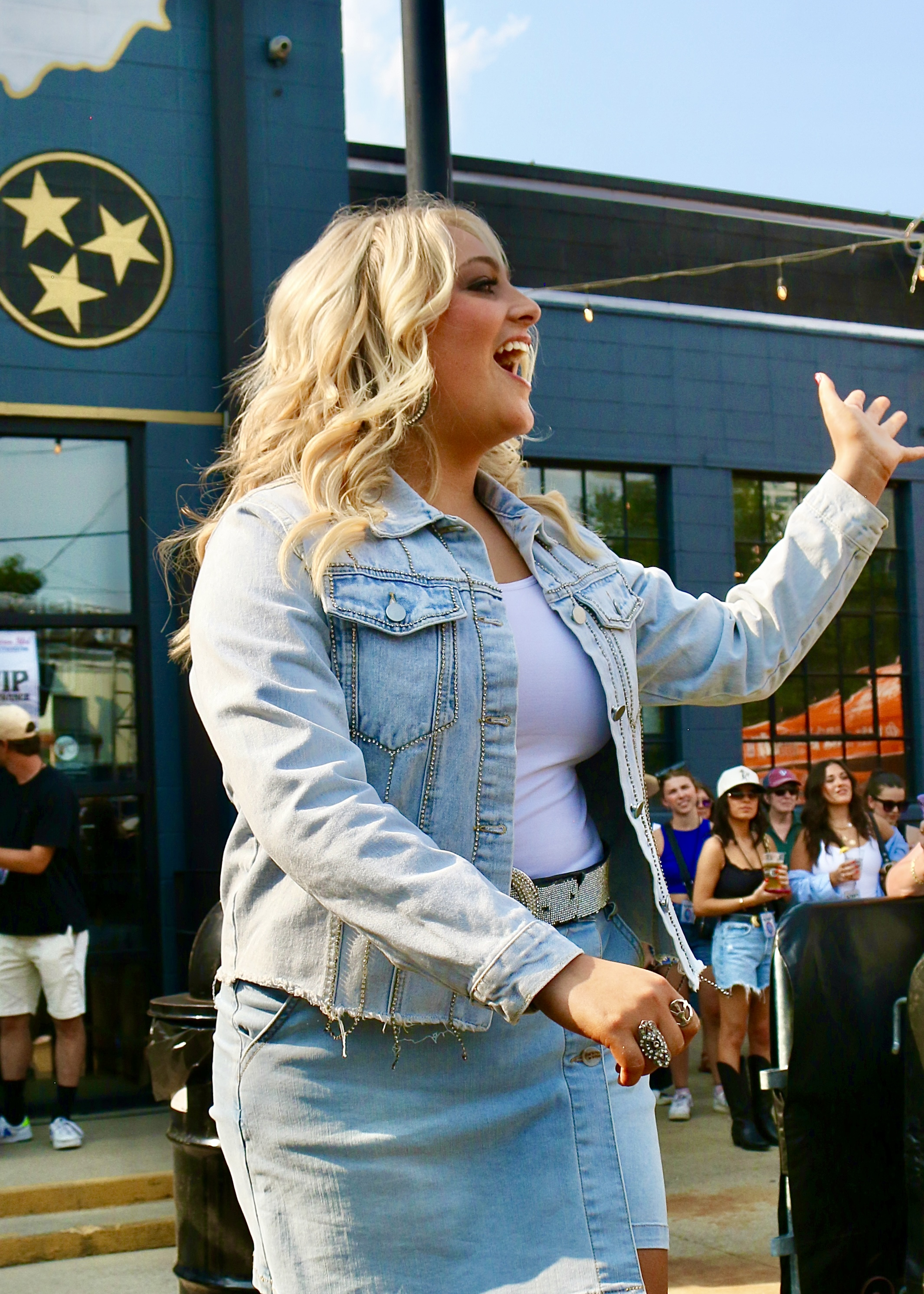
- HunterGirl approaches the stage to perform at the 2025 19/Idol/BMG CMA Fest Takeover in Nashville, TN.

Background information
- Born: Winchester, Tennessee, US
- Genre: Country
- Occupation: Singer-songwriter
- Instruments: Vocals; guitar
- Years active: 2021–present
- Labels: Wheelhouse; 19 Recordings
- Website: www.huntergirlsmusic.com

Hunter Wolkonowski, known professionally as HunterGirl, is an American country music singer-songwriter from Winchester, Tennessee signed to Wheelhouse and 19 Recordings. She was the runner-up on the twentieth season of American Idol in 2022.

== Background ==
HunterGirl adopted her stage name due to the difficulty in people pronouncing her last name correctly growing up, and from the way others would differentiate her as "the girl Hunter" from all the boys who shared her name. HunterGirl began writing songs at age 9 and moved to Nashville at age 18, eventually trying out for American Idol and coming in second place on the show's twentieth season in 2022. After her stint on the show, HunterGirl signed a joint deal with Wheelhouse and 19 Recordings, and "Ain't About You" was released on October 23, 2023, as her debut single to country radio. She wrote it when she was contemplating giving up performing after unsuccessfully chasing her dreams in Nashville for five years, right before she auditioned for American Idol, and had no intention of letting anyone hear the song at first. But when executive vice president of BBR Music Group Jon Loba heard it, he insisted on it becoming a single. After release, it was believed to be the first instance of a female country singer on a major label's debut single being entirely self-written since Mary Chapin Carpenter ("How Do") in 1989. It received 46 first-week station adds and charted on the Billboard Country Airplay chart. Her debut EP, Tennessee Girl, was released on June 7, 2024.

== Discography ==
=== Extended plays ===
List of EPs, with selected details, chart positions and sales
Title	Album details
Tennessee Girl	Release date: June 7, 2024; Label: Wheelhouse/19 Recordings; Format: Digital download

=== Singles ===
List of singles, with selected chart positions
Title	Year	Peak chart positions	Album
Title	Year	US Country Airplay	Album
"Ain't About You"	2023	53	Tennessee Girl
