= American Idol season 16 =

Season of television series

American Idol
- Season 16
- Promotional poster
- Hosted by: Ryan Seacrest
- Judges: Luke Bryan; Katy Perry; Lionel Richie
- Winner: Maddie Poppe
- Runner-up: Caleb Lee Hutchinson
- No. of episodes: 19

Release
- Original network: ABC
- Original release: March 11 – May 21, 2018

Season chronology
- ← Previous; Season 15 Next → Season 17

The sixteenth season of American Idol premiered on March 11, 2018, on the ABC television network. It was the show's first season to air on ABC, and after 15 years, Ryan Seacrest continued his role as host, while Katy Perry, Luke Bryan, and Lionel Richie joined the show as judges. Maddie Poppe won the season on May 21, 2018, while Caleb Lee Hutchinson was the runner-up, and Gabby Barrett finished in third place.

== Background ==
In early 2017, Variety reported that FremantleMedia was in talks to revive the show for either NBC or Fox, the show's original network. A dispute between Fremantle and Core Media Group derailed these plans. In May 2017, it was announced that ABC was making a bid to revive the program. Later, ABC announced that it had acquired the rights to the series and that American Idol would return for the 2017–18 television season. On November 6, 2017, it was announced that the revival would premiere on March 11, 2018.

On July 20, 2017, it was announced on Live with Kelly and Ryan that Ryan Seacrest would return as host for the revival season. On May 16, 2017, Katy Perry was the first judge to be announced by ABC. On September 23, Luke Bryan was announced for a second judge, and on September 29, Lionel Richie was announced as the final. On February 21, 2018, it was announced that iHeartRadio radio personality Bobby Bones would serve as the mentor for the top 24 this season.

On April 23, 2018, ABC announced that the April 29, May 6, and May 13 live shows of the season would air across all mainland U.S. time zones, a first for American Idol.

== Regional auditions ==
In June 2017, it was announced that American Idol would begin two bus tours in 19 cities, and this was later increased to 22, for auditions beginning on August 17, 2017. Those who passed the first audition went in front of the producers, where they would be selected to appear before the judges in different cities. Instead of focusing on a city in each episode as had been the case in previous seasons, each episode this season showed a compilation of auditions from different cities.

American Idol (season 16) – regional auditions
City	Filming date(s)	Filming venue
New York City, New York	October 3–4, 2017	Madison Square Garden
New Orleans, Louisiana	October 14, 2017	Mardi Gras World
Nashville, Tennessee	October 19–20, 2017	Country Music Hall of Fame and Museum
Savannah, Georgia	October 28–29, 2017	Kehoe Iron Works
Los Angeles, California	November 16–17, 2017	Hollywood and Highland Center

During the live broadcast of the 2017 American Music Awards, three contestants who did not advance after their auditions in front of the judges were given one more chance to convince the audience to vote for them. The contestants were Britany Holmes, Maris, and Dominique Smith. The winner of the golden ticket to Hollywood was then revealed the next night on an episode of Dancing with the Stars. Lionel Richie appeared in the show and announced that the vote was in favor of Britney Holmes, a 28-year-old vocal coach from Texas, who advanced to Hollywood as the first semifinalist of the season.

== Hollywood week ==
Hollywood Week aired over two episodes on March 26 and April 1. It featured three rounds: lines of ten, a group round, and a solo round. In the first round, each contestant sang individually, and after ten had sung, they gathered in a line. Those who impressed the judges and the producers were advanced to the next round, where the contestants performed together in groups of four or five. The contestants who passed the group rounds performed their final solos before advancing to the Showcase round.

== Showcase round ==
The Showcase round aired on April 2, which featured the top 50 performing for the judges and a live audience at Exchange LA, a nightclub in Los Angeles. On April 3, the judges narrowed the number of contestants down from 50 to 24. The top 24 contestants then moved on to perform solos and celebrity duets.

Here is a list of the contestants who reached the top 24 and the song they performed at the Showcase. Contestants are listed in the order they performed.

Showcase round (April 2)
Contestant	Song
Layla Spring	"Proud Mary"
Michael J. Woodard	"You Oughta Know"
Gabby Barrett	"Church Bells"
Michelle Sussett	"24K Magic"
Dominique	"Landslide"
Trevor McBane	"Wake Me Up"
Maddie Poppe	"Me and Bobby McGee"
Ron Bultongez	"All I Want"
Alyssa Raghu	"Every Breath You Take"
Catie Turner	"Bad Romance"
Jurnee	"Never Enough"
Shannon O'Hara	"Unconditionally"
Kay Kay	"Brokenhearted"
Amelia Hammer Harris	"Paint It Black"
Brandon Diaz	"Let's Get It On"
Adam Sanders (as Ada Vox)	"Creep"
Jonny Brenns	"Lay Me Down"
Mara Justine	"Something's Got a Hold on Me"
Caleb Lee Hutchinson	"I Was Wrong"
Garrett Jacobs	"Knock on Wood"
Cade Foehner	"No Good"
Effie Passero	"The Dance"
Marcio Donaldson	"If You Really Love Me"
Dennis Lorenzo	"A Song for You"

== Top 24 ==
The top 24 contestants were split into two groups of twelve. Prerecorded performances of the first group aired on April 8 and 9, and the second group on April 15 and 16. On the first episode, each contestant performed one solo; and on the second episode, each contestant performed one duet with a celebrity singer. The judges then eliminated five contestants from each group on the second episode.

The artists who performed duets with the top 24 were Banners, Aloe Blacc, Bishop Briggs, Cam, Colbie Caillat, Luis Fonsi, Andy Grammer, Lea Michele, Patrick Monahan, Rachel Platten, Bebe Rexha, Sugarland, and Allen Stone.

Color key:

This contestant was chosen by the judges to advance to the live shows.
This contestant was eliminated.

=== Group 1 ===
Contestants are listed in the order they performed.

Group 1 (April 8)
Contestant	Song
Dominique	"Ain't Nobody"
Layla Spring	"A Broken Wing"
Catie Turner	"Call Me"
Dennis Lorenzo	"Rude"
Michelle Sussett	"If I Were a Boy"
Michael J. Woodard	"Golden Slumbers"
Trevor McBane	"Way Down We Go"
Jonny Brenns	"Georgia"
Kay Kay	"Love on the Brain"
Brandon Diaz	"Hello"
Gabby Barrett	"My Church"
Cade Foehner	"All Along the Watchtower"

Group 1 (April 9)
Contestant	Song	Result
Catie Turner	"Good to Be Alive (Hallelujah)" (with Andy Grammer)	Advanced
Cade Foehner	"Never Tear Us Apart" (with Bishop Briggs)	Advanced
Layla Spring	"Stuck Like Glue" (with Sugarland)	Eliminated
Dominique	"Wake Me Up" (with Aloe Blacc)	Eliminated
Brandon Diaz	"Despacito" (with Luis Fonsi)	Eliminated
Kay Kay	"Drive By" (with Patrick Monahan)	Eliminated
Trevor McBane	"River" (with Bishop Briggs)	Eliminated
Michelle Sussett	"I Can't Make You Love Me" (with Luis Fonsi)	Advanced
Jonny Brenns	"Back Home" (with Andy Grammer)	Advanced
Dennis Lorenzo	"Unaware" (with Allen Stone)	Advanced
Michael J. Woodard	"Angel in Blue Jeans" (with Patrick Monahan)	Advanced
Gabby Barrett	"Stay" (with Sugarland)	Advanced

=== Group 2 ===
Contestants are listed in the order they performed.

Group 2 (April 15)
Contestant	Song
Amelia Hammer Harris	"Believer"
Garrett Jacobs	"Treat You Better"
Maddie Poppe	"Brand New Key"
Ada Vox	"Feeling Good"
Caleb Lee Hutchinson	"Die a Happy Man"
Effie Passero	"Barracuda"
Alyssa Raghu	"Stay"
Marcio Donaldson	"Inseparable"
Mara Justine	"Run to You"
Jurnee	"Flashlight"
Shannon O'Hara	"All I Ask"
Ron Bultongez	"Dancing On My Own"

Group 2 (April 16)
Contestant	Song	Result
Caleb Lee Hutchinson	"Meant to Be" (with Bebe Rexha)	Advanced
Ada Vox	"Defying Gravity" (with Lea Michele)	Advanced
Maddie Poppe	"Bubbly" (with Colbie Caillat)	Advanced
Ron Bultongez	"Someone to You" (with Banners)	Eliminated
Amelia Hammer Harris	"Me, Myself & I" (with Bebe Rexha)	Eliminated
Shannon O'Hara	"Burning House" (with Cam)	Eliminated
Alyssa Raghu	"Yellow" (with Banners)	Eliminated
Marcio Donaldson	"What's Going On" (with Allen Stone)	Advanced
Jurnee	"Run to You" (with Lea Michele)	Advanced
Garrett Jacobs	"Lucky" (with Colbie Caillat)	Advanced
Mara Justine	"Fight Song" (with Rachel Platten)	Advanced
Effie Passero	"Diane" (with Cam)	Eliminated

== Top 14 ==
The Top 14 performances aired on Sunday, April 22, followed by the live results show on Monday, April 23.

Color key:

This contestant was chosen by the public to advance.
This contestant was not chosen by the public, and had to perform again for the judges.
This contestant was not chosen by the public, but was chosen by the judges as a Wild Card pick.
This contestant was immune from elimination and performed a "victory song."
This contestant was eliminated.

Contestants are listed in the order they performed.

Top 14 (April 22)
Contestant	Song	Result
Caleb Lee Hutchinson	"Midnight Train to Memphis"	Advanced
Michelle Sussett	"Friends"	Wild Card
Marcio Donaldson	"It's a Miracle"	Wild Card
Mara Justine	"This Is Me"	Wild Card
Garrett Jacobs	"Raging Fire"	Wild Card
Ada Vox	"The Show Must Go On"	Wild Card
Catie Turner	"Take Me to Church"	Advanced
Cade Foehner	"Black Magic Woman"	Advanced
Dennis Lorenzo	"In My Blood"	Wild Card
Maddie Poppe	"Homeward Bound"	Advanced
Jurnee	"Bang Bang"	Wild Card
Jonny Brenns	"This Is Gospel"	Wild Card
Michael J. Woodard	"Titanium"	Advanced
Gabby Barrett	"The Climb"	Advanced

Top 14 (April 23)
Contestant	Song	Result
Maddie Poppe	"Walk Like an Egyptian"	Immune
Michelle Sussett	"I'm a Dreamer"	Advanced
Marcio Donaldson	"Jealous"	Eliminated
Cade Foehner	"Bright Lights"	Immune
Garrett Jacobs	"Have You Ever Seen the Rain?"	Eliminated
Gabby Barrett	"Little Red Wagon"	Immune
Dennis Lorenzo	"This Woman's Work"	Advanced
Jonny Brenns	"Demons"	Eliminated
Caleb Lee Hutchinson	"Gettin' You Home (The Black Dress Song)"	Immune
Mara Justine	"Love on the Brain"	Eliminated
Jurnee	"Never Enough"	Advanced
Michael J. Woodard	"Believe in Yourself"	Immune
Catie Turner	"Havana"	Immune
Ada Vox	"And I Am Telling You I'm Not Going"	Advanced

== Top 10 contestants ==
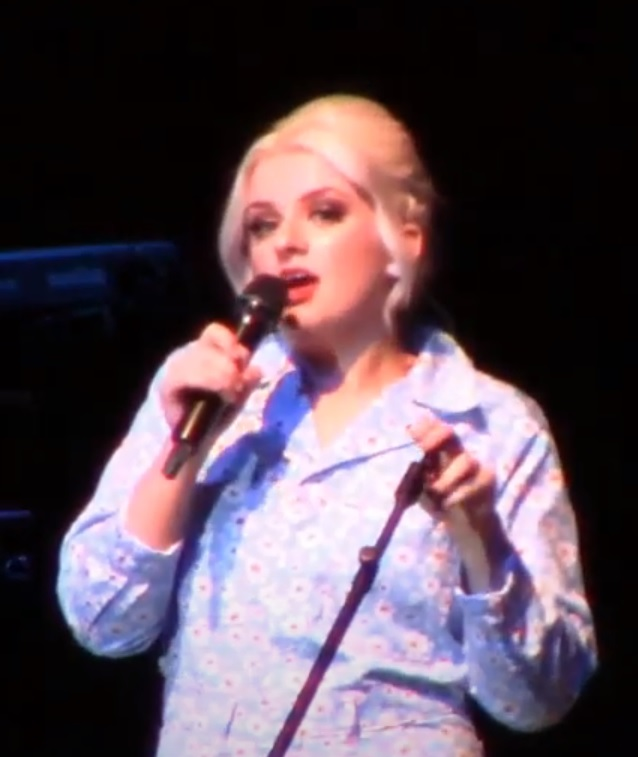
Maddie Poppe

- Maddie Poppe (born December 5, 1997) was from Clarksville, Iowa. She auditioned in New York City by performing "Rainbow Connection." In Hollywood, she sang "Dreams" by Brandi Carlile as her first solo and performed her original song "Don't Ever Let Your Children Grow Up" as her final solo. She advanced to the top 24 after performing "Me and Bobby McGee" in the Showcase round. During the course of the season, she played the ukulele, guitar and keyboard.

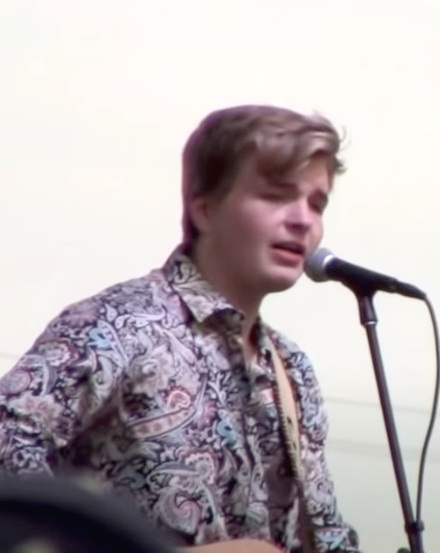
Caleb Lee Hutchinson

- Caleb Lee Hutchinson (born March 2, 1999) was from Dallas, Georgia. He auditioned in Atlanta by performing "If It Hadn't Been for Love." In Hollywood, he performed Keith Whitley's "Don't Close Your Eyes" as his first solo. He made it to the Showcase round by singing Josh Turner's "Your Man" as his second solo. After performing "I Was Wrong" by Chris Stapleton, Hutchinson advanced to the top 24 semifinals.

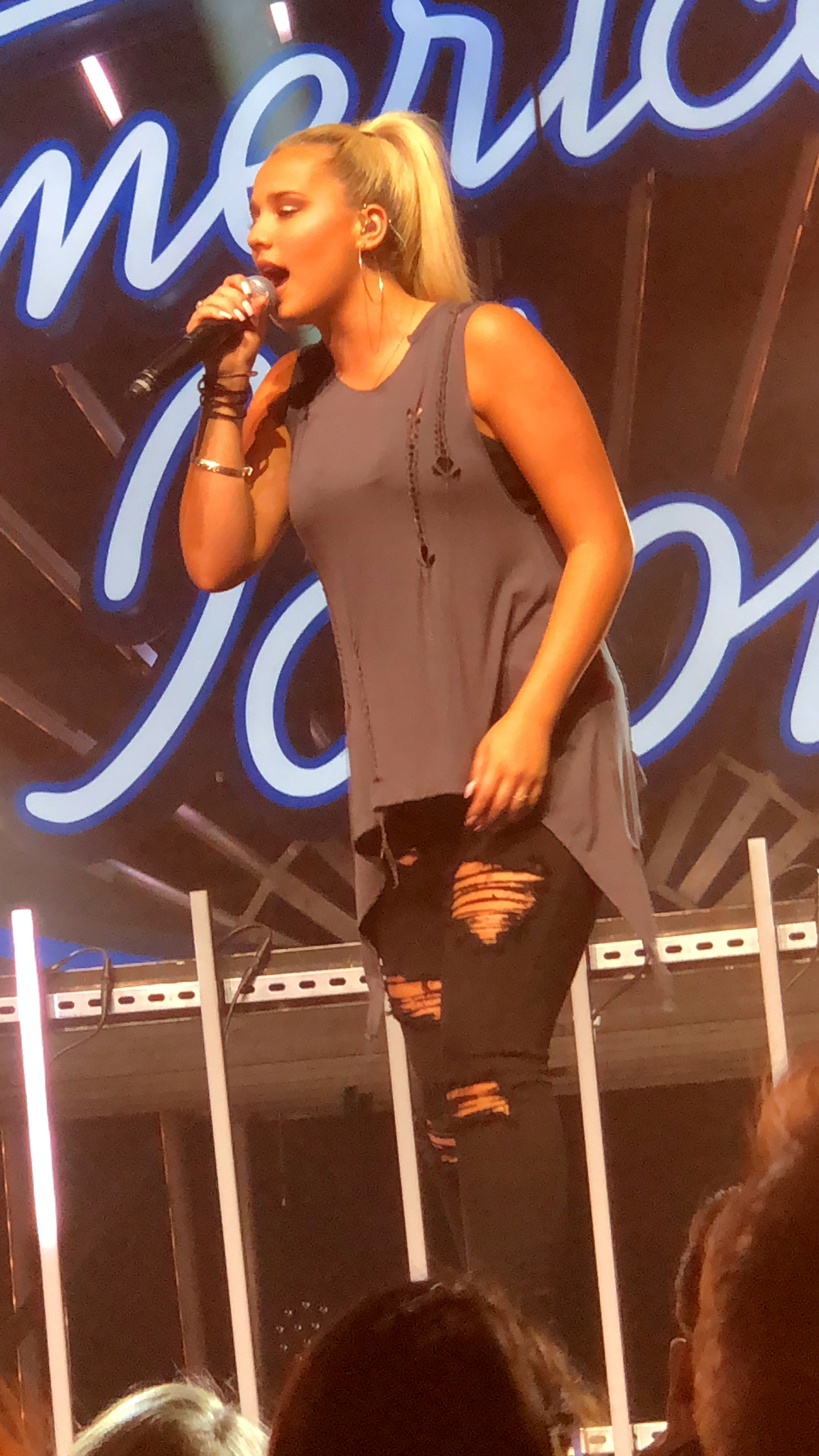
Gabby Barrett

- Gabby Barrett (born March 5, 2000) was from Pittsburgh. She auditioned in Nashville, intending to perform one song, but the judges encouraged her to sing a church song instead. She sang "His Eye Is on the Sparrow" and advanced to Hollywood. She sang Aretha Franklin's "Ain't No Way" as her final solo and advanced to the Showcase round, where she then sang "Church Bells" by Carrie Underwood and advanced to the top 24.

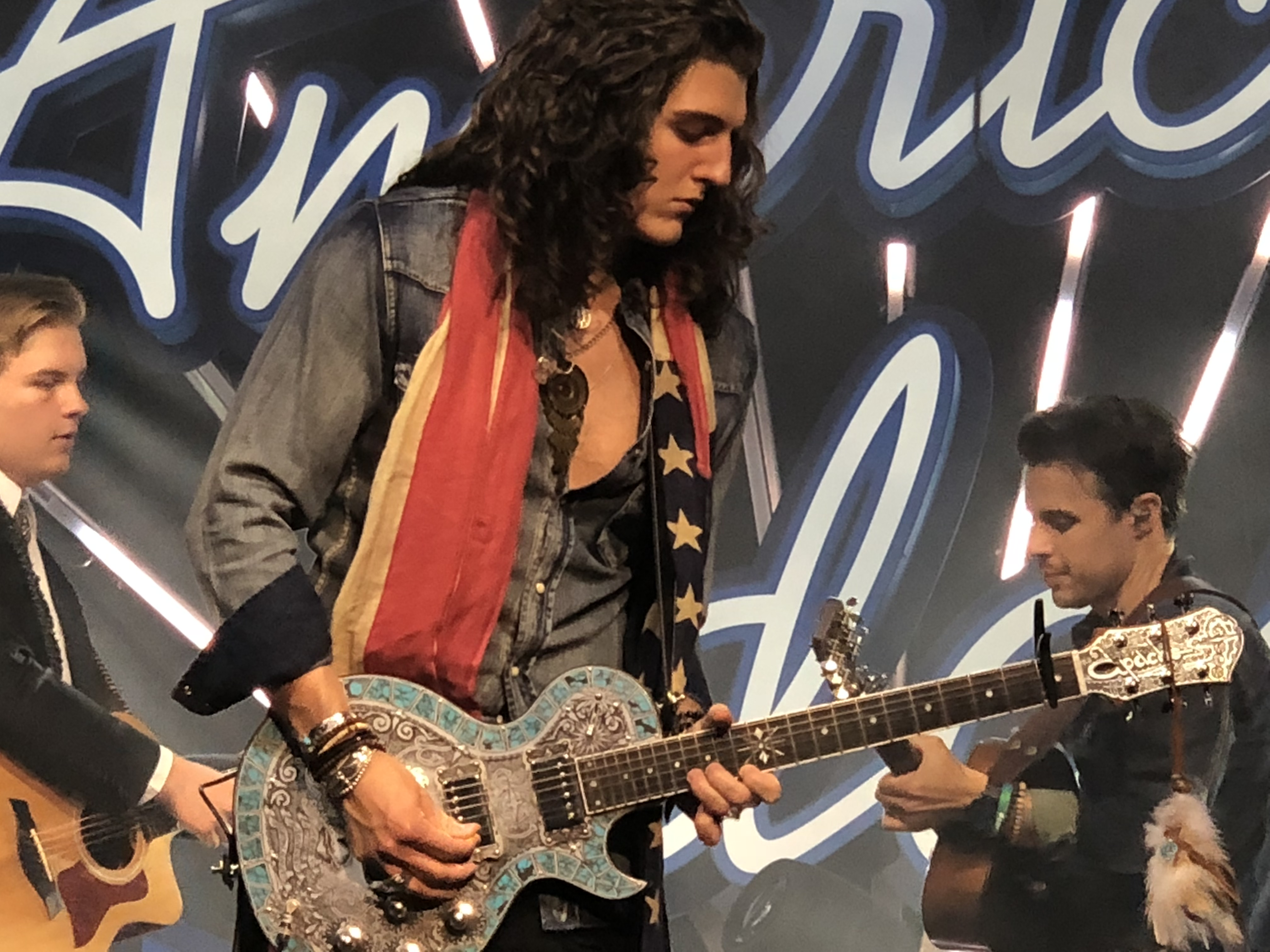
Cade Foehner

- Cade Foehner (born July 24, 1996) was from Shelbyville, Texas. He earned a golden ticket from the judges after singing The Black Crowes' "She Talks to Angels" at his audition in New Orleans. In Hollywood, he performed "The Thrill Is Gone" by B.B. King as his first solo and "Feel It Still" by Portugal. The Man as the final solo. He sang Kaleo's "No Good" to advance in the semifinals in the Showcase round.
- Michael J. Woodard (born October 6, 1997) was from Philadelphia. For his audition, he sang "Make It Rain." He then progressed to the Showcase round after performing "Maybe This Time." He also sang Alanis Morissette's "You Oughta Know" to advance in the top 24.
- Catie Turner (born February 14, 2000) was from Langhorne, Pennsylvania. She had auditioned for American Idol's fifteenth season, but was rejected by the producers. She auditioned in New York City and sang her original song "21st Century Machine." She also sang the Beatles' "Come Together" and another original song during the solo rounds of Hollywood Week. She sang "Bad Romance" by Lady Gaga in the Showcase round to earn a spot in the top 24.
- Jurnee (born May 11, 1999) was from Denver. She had also auditioned for the fifteenth season, but did not make it through. She auditioned in Savannah with "Rise Up" by Andra Day. She also sang Demi Lovato's "You Don't Do It for Me Anymore" as her first solo and Ariana Grande's "One Last Time" to advance to the Showcase round. She made it to the semifinals after singing "Never Enough."
- Dennis Lorenzo (born April 4, 1991) was from Philadelphia. For his audition, he sang "Unaware." He sang two songs in Hollywood: "Thinking Out Loud" as his first solo and "Home" by Daughtry as his final solo. He advanced during the Showcase round by performing "A Song for You" and moved on to the semifinals.
- Michelle Sussett (born August 2, 1995) was from Miami and she was born in Venezuela. After she passed her audition in Los Angeles, she sang "I'm Coming Out" by Diana Ross in Hollywood. She also sang "24K Magic" by Bruno Mars and made it to the top 24.
- Ada Vox (born May 17, 1993), whose birth name was Adam Sanders, was a drag queen from San Antonio, Texas. He had auditioned in the twelfth season, but was cut before the semifinals. As Ada, she sang "The House of the Rising Sun" at her audition in Savannah. After advancing through Hollywood, she sang "Creep" by Radiohead and made it to the semifinals.

== Top 10 ==
Color key:

This contestant was saved by America's vote.
This contestant was eliminated.
This contestant won American Idol.
This contestant was the runner-up.
This contestant finished in third place.

=== Top 10 – Disney (April 29) ===
Idina Menzel served as a guest mentor this week. Each contestant performed one song from a Disney movie. Contestants are listed in the order they performed.

Contestant	Song	Disney film	Result
Maddie Poppe	"The Bare Necessities"	The Jungle Book	Safe
Jurnee	"How Far I'll Go"	Moana	Safe
Cade Foehner	"Kiss the Girl"	The Little Mermaid	Safe
Ada Vox	"Circle of Life"	The Lion King	Eliminated
Michelle Sussett	"Remember Me"	Coco	Eliminated
Gabby Barrett	"Colors of the Wind"	Pocahontas	Safe
Michael J. Woodard	"Beauty and the Beast"	Beauty and the Beast	Safe
Caleb Lee Hutchinson	"You've Got a Friend in Me"	Toy Story	Safe
Catie Turner	"Once Upon a Dream"	Sleeping Beauty	Safe
Dennis Lorenzo	"Can You Feel the Love Tonight"	The Lion King	Eliminated

Non-competition performance
Performers	Song
Top 10 with Katy Perry	"When You Wish Upon a Star" (from Pinocchio)

=== Top 7 – Prince & contestants' birth year (May 6) ===
Nick Jonas served as a guest mentor this week. Each contestant performed two songs: one song from the Prince discography and one song from the year of their birth. Contestants are listed in the order they performed.

Contestant	Order	Song	Result
Jurnee	1	"Kiss"	Eliminated
Jurnee	11	"Back at One"	Eliminated
Gabby Barrett	2	"I Hope You Dance"	Safe
Gabby Barrett	10	"How Come U Don't Call Me Anymore?"	Safe
Michael J. Woodard	3	"I Would Die 4 U"	Safe
Michael J. Woodard	8	"My Heart Will Go On"	Safe
Cade Foehner	4	"Who Will Save Your Soul"	Safe
Cade Foehner	9	"Jungle Love"	Safe
Catie Turner	5	"Oops!... I Did It Again"	Eliminated
Catie Turner	12	"Manic Monday"	Eliminated
Caleb Lee Hutchinson	6	"Amazed"	Safe
Caleb Lee Hutchinson	14	"When Doves Cry"	Safe
Maddie Poppe	7	"Nothing Compares 2 U"	Safe
Maddie Poppe	13	"If It Makes You Happy"	Safe

=== Top 5 – Carrie Underwood & Mother's Day (May 13) ===
Carrie Underwood was a guest mentor this week. Each contestant performed two songs: one song from her discography and one song dedicated to their mothers in honor of Mother's Day. Contestants are listed in the order they performed.

Contestant	Order	Song	Result
Michael J. Woodard	1	"Flat on the Floor"	Eliminated
Michael J. Woodard	8	"Still I Rise"	Eliminated
Gabby Barrett	2	"Last Name"	Safe
Gabby Barrett	6	"I Have Nothing"	Safe
Cade Foehner	3	"Undo It"	Eliminated
Cade Foehner	7	"Simple Man"	Eliminated
Caleb Lee Hutchinson	4	"So Small"	Safe
Caleb Lee Hutchinson	9	"Stars in Alabama"	Safe
Maddie Poppe	5	"I Told You So"	Safe
Maddie Poppe	10	"God Only Knows"	Safe

Non-competition performance
Performers	Song
Top 5 with Carrie Underwood	"See You Again"
Carrie Underwood	"Cry Pretty"

=== Top 3 – Finale (May 21) ===
Bobby Bones served as a guest mentor this week. Each contestant performed three songs: their winner's song, a reprise of their favorite performance from the season, and a song dedicated to their hometowns. Contestants are listed in the order they performed.

Contestant	Order	Song	Result
Caleb Lee Hutchinson	1	"Johnny Cash Heart"	Runner-up
Caleb Lee Hutchinson	4	"Don't Close Your Eyes"	Runner-up
Caleb Lee Hutchinson	7	"Folsom Prison Blues"	Runner-up
Gabby Barrett	2	"Rivers Deep"	Third place
Gabby Barrett	5	"Little Red Wagon"	Third place
Gabby Barrett	8	"Don't Stop Believin'"	Third place
Maddie Poppe	3	"Going Going Gone"	Winner
Maddie Poppe	6	"Don't Ever Let Your Children Grow Up"	Winner
Maddie Poppe	9	"Landslide"	Winner

Non-competition performance
Performers	Song
Harper Grace	"Yard Sale"
Jonny Brenns	"Blue Jeans"
Michelle Sussett	"I'm a Dreamer"
Catie Turner	"21st Century Machine"
Top 10 with Lionel Richie	"All Night Long (All Night)"
Nick Jonas and DJ Mustard	"Anywhere"
Jurnee with Nick Jonas	"Jealous"
Luke Bryan	"Sunrise, Sunburn, Sunset"
Gabby Barrett with Luke Bryan	"Most People Are Good"
Cade Foehner and Dennis Lorenzo with Gary Clark Jr.	"Bright Lights"
Maddie Poppe with Kermit the Frog	"Rainbow Connection"
Caleb Lee Hutchinson with Darius Rucker	"Wagon Wheel"
Maddie Poppe, Caleb Lee Hutchinson, and Gabby Barrett with Bebe Rexha	"Meant to Be"
Layla Spring and Dyxie Spring with LeAnn Rimes	"Blue"
Catie Turner with Katy Perry	"Part of Me"
Michael J. Woodard with Yolanda Adams	"What the World Needs Now Is Love"
Maddie Poppe and Caleb Lee Hutchinson	"Somewhere Over the Rainbow/ What a Wonderful World"
Ada Vox with Patti LaBelle	"Lady Marmalade"
Maddie Poppe	"Going Going Gone"

== Elimination chart ==
Color key:

Winner
Runner-up
Third place
Did not perform
Wild Card
Saved by the public
Saved by the judges
Immune from elimination
Eliminated

American Idol (season 16) - Eliminations
Contestant	Pl.	Top 24		Top 14	Wild Card	Top 10	Top 7	Top 5	Finale
Contestant	Pl.	4/9	4/16	4/22	4/23	4/29	5/6	5/13	5/21
Maddie Poppe	1	N/A	Safe	Safe	Immune	Safe	Safe	Safe	Winner
Caleb Lee Hutchinson	2	N/A	Safe	Safe	Immune	Safe	Safe	Safe	Runner-up
Gabby Barrett	3	Safe	N/A	Safe	Immune	Safe	Safe	Safe	Third place
Cade Foehner	4	Safe	N/A	Safe	Immune	Safe	Safe	Eliminated	
Michael J. Woodard	4	Safe	N/A	Safe	Immune	Safe	Safe	Eliminated	
Catie Turner	6	Safe	N/A	Safe	Immune	Safe	Eliminated		
Jurnee	6	N/A	Safe	Wild Card	Saved	Safe	Eliminated		
Dennis Lorenzo	8	Safe	N/A	Wild Card	Saved	Eliminated			
Michelle Sussett	8	Safe	N/A	Wild Card	Saved	Eliminated			
Ada Vox	8	N/A	Safe	Wild Card	Saved	Eliminated			
Jonny Brenns		Safe	N/A	Wild Card	Eliminated				
Marcio Donaldson		N/A	Safe	Wild Card	Eliminated				
Garrett Jacobs		N/A	Safe	Wild Card	Eliminated				
Mara Justine		N/A	Safe	Wild Card	Eliminated				
Ron Bultongez		N/A	Eliminated						
Amelia Hammer Harris		N/A	Eliminated						
Shannon O'Hara		N/A	Eliminated						
Effie Passero		N/A	Eliminated						
Alyssa Raghu		N/A	Eliminated						
Kay Kay Alexis		Eliminated							
Brandon Diaz		Eliminated							
Trevor McBane		Eliminated							
Dominique Posey		Eliminated							
Layla Spring		Eliminated							

== Reception ==
=== Ratings ===
Viewership and ratings per episode of American Idol season 16
No.	Title	Air date	Timeslot (ET)	Rating/share (18–49)	Viewers (millions)	DVR (18–49)	DVR viewers (millions)	Total (18–49)	Total viewers (millions)
1	"Auditions, Part 1"	March 11, 2018	Sunday 8:00 p.m.	2.3/8	10.48	0.4	1.35	2.7	11.84
2	"Auditions, Part 2"	March 12, 2018	Monday 8:00 p.m.	1.8/7	8.41	0.4	1.36	2.2	9.77
3	"Auditions, Part 3"	March 18, 2018	Sunday 8:00 p.m.	1.8/6	7.81	0.4	1.38	2.2	9.19
4	"Auditions, Part 4"	March 19, 2018	Monday 8:00 p.m.	1.6/6	7.68	0.5	1.94	2.1	9.59
5	"Auditions, Part 5"	March 25, 2018	Sunday 8:00 p.m.	1.7/6	7.51	0.5	—N/a	2.2	—N/a
6	"Hollywood Week, Part 1"	March 26, 2018	Monday 8:00 p.m.	1.7/6	7.80	0.3	1.33	2.0	9.14
7	"Hollywood Week, Part 2"	April 1, 2018	Sunday 8:00 p.m.	1.6/6	7.48	0.5	1.42	2.1	8.90
8	"Showcase Round & Final Judgment"	April 2, 2018	Monday 8:00 p.m.	1.4/5	7.16	0.4	1.53	1.8	8.69
9	"Top 24 Solos, Part 1"	April 8, 2018	Sunday 8:00 p.m.	1.5/6	7.23	0.4	1.32	1.8	8.55
10	"Top 24 Celebrity Duets, Part 1"	April 9, 2018	Monday 8:00 p.m.	1.6/6	7.72	0.3	1.39	1.9	9.11
11	"Top 24 Solos, Part 2"	April 15, 2018	Sunday 8:00 p.m.	1.3/5	6.35	0.4	1.28	1.7	7.63
12	"Top 24 Celebrity Duets, Part 2"	April 16, 2018	Monday 8:00 p.m.	1.4/5	6.97	0.2	1.15	1.6	8.12
13	"Top 14 Perform"	April 22, 2018	Sunday 8:00 p.m.	1.5/6	7.46	0.3	1.24	1.8	8.71
14	"Top 10 Reveal"	April 23, 2018	Monday 8:00 p.m.	1.4/5	7.61	0.2	1.14	1.6	8.77
15	"Top 10 Perform: Disney Night"	April 29, 2018	Sunday 8:00 p.m.	1.9/7	8.77	0.5	1.18	2.4	9.95
16	"Top 7 Perform"	May 6, 2018	Sunday 8:00 p.m.	1.8/7	8.65	—N/a	—N/a	—N/a	—N/a
17	"Top 5 Perform"	May 13, 2018	Sunday 8:00 p.m.	1.7/7	8.53	0.3	1.23	2.0	9.76
18	"Performance Finals"	May 20, 2018	Sunday 8:00 p.m.	1.3/5	7.47	—N/a	—N/a	—N/a	—N/a
19	"Grand Finale"	May 21, 2018	Monday 9:00 p.m.	1.6/6	8.63	0.3	1.27	1.9	9.95

=== Critical response ===
On the review aggregation website Rotten Tomatoes, the premiere episode holds an approval rating of 70% based on 20 reviews, with an average rating of 6.51/10. Metacritic, which uses a weighted average, assigned the season a score of 60 out of 100 based on eight reviews, indicating "mixed or average" reviews.

== Concert tour ==
The top 7 finalists performed for the summer tour along with eighth season Kris Allen.
