= Maddie Poppe =

American singer-songwriter (born 1997)

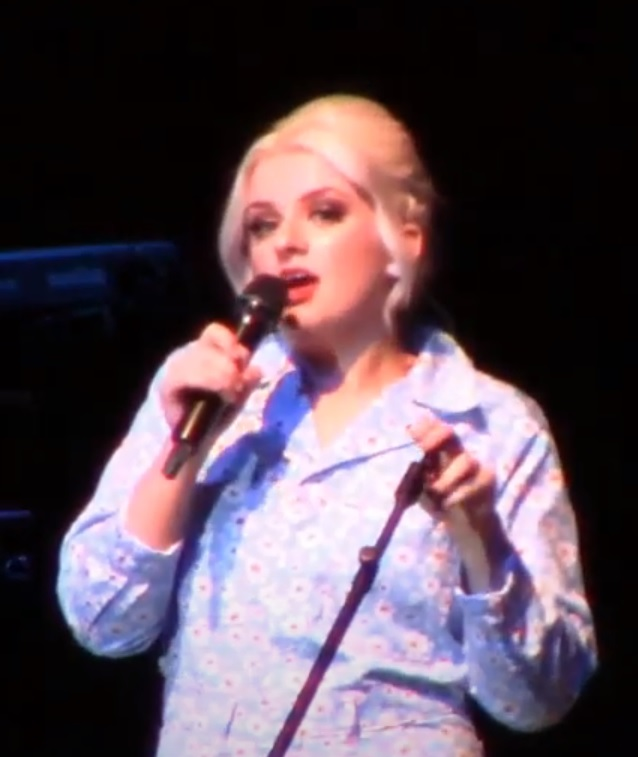
- Poppe at the Iowa State Fair in 2019

Background information
- Born: Madeline Mae Poppe; December 5, 1997 (age 28); Clarksville, Iowa, U. S.
- Genres: Indie pop; folk
- Occupations: Singer; songwriter
- Instruments: Vocals; guitar; piano; ukulele
- Years active: 2015–present
- Labels: Hollywood; 19
- Website: maddiepoppe.com

Madeline Mae Poppe (born December 5, 1997) is an American singer-songwriter, musician, and the sixteenth season winner of American Idol. She is a multi-instrumentalist—playing the guitar, piano, and ukulele. Prior to winning American Idol in 2018, Poppe released an independent album titled Songs from the Basement. Poppe released her second studio album, Whirlwind, with Hollywood Records in 2019.

== Early life ==
Maddie Poppe was born to Trent and Tonya Poppe in Clarksville, Iowa. As a young girl, Poppe sang for her family, but did not start performing until she was in middle school. She graduated Clarksville High School in 2016, attended Iowa Central Community College and then went to Hawkeye Community College. Her father is also a musician and is a guitarist.

Poppe began playing guitar at age 14. She began performing at church, as well as with her father's band at the Pioneer Days festival. Poppe had also been a stagehand, setting up equipment for musicians at the county fair. She got her start performing at the Butler County Fairgrounds in Allison, Iowa.

Poppe has talked about not wanting to settle for things she did not like to do. She remarked, "I was trying to get gigs while I was supposed to be paying attention to a lecture."

== Career ==
=== 2015–2016: Songs from the Basement and The Voice ===
Poppe independently released her first album, Songs from the Basement, on June 20, 2016. That same month, Poppe opened for Diamond Rio at the Butler County Fair.

Prior to Idol, she auditioned for the tenth season of The Voice in 2016. The program aired on February 29, 2016 where she sang "Dog Days Are Over" from Florence and the Machine, but none of the judges (who were Adam Levine, Pharrell Williams, Christina Aguilera, and Blake Shelton) turned their chairs, thus being eliminated. Despite her elimination, Clarksville honored her with a city event at the Clarksville Library.

=== 2017–2018: American Idol ===
In an audition held in New York, Poppe sang "Rainbow Connection" from The Muppet Movie. Judge Lionel Richie said she had a "storytelling voice" and that "we need you in this show". Katy Perry said she had a "distinctive quality in your voice" and Luke Bryan said "I'm not critiquing you, 'cause you got me, I'm saying yes." After singing her original song "Don't Ever Let Your Children Grow Up," Perry said Poppe reminded her of herself as they "write a little bit of the same style."

Before her Top 24 performance, Poppe admitted that she didn't expect to win American Idol, planning to make it to Top 24 and get eliminated at some point. "This sounds terrible, but I don't want to go into things with super high hopes because then, obviously, I would be super let down if it doesn't work out," she told Bobby Bones. Poppe also admitted she has stage fright. "I remember times when I'd gotten up on stage and it totally just flopped. I fear that every time I walk on stage, I worry that it's going to happen again."

In her Top 14, Poppe sang "Homeward Bound" by Simon & Garfunkel, sparking Katy Perry to remark, "I closed my eyes and I thought I was listening to Joni Mitchell," while Luke Bryan labeled the interweaving of her modal voice and falsetto as "seasoned" and "big-time pro."

Prior to the May 20 finale, Iowa Governor Kim Reynolds declared May 20, 2018 to be "Maddie Poppe Day". During the finale, she performed her winners' single "Going Going Gone", which was originally written by Mitch Allan, Lindy Robbins and Julia Michaels. At the end of the show, after Poppe performed "Landslide" by Fleetwood Mac, Katy Perry revealed she would be voting for her.

On the results show broadcast on May 21, Poppe was declared the winner, with Caleb Lee Hutchinson as runner-up and Gabby Barrett in third. Poppe was also the first female winner since Candice Glover in the twelfth season and the first Caucasian female winner since Carrie Underwood in the fourth season.

American Idol season 16 performances and results
Episode	Theme	Song Choice	Original Artist	Order Number	Result
Audition	Auditioner's Choice	"Rainbow Connection"	Kermit the Frog	N/A	Advanced
Hollywood Round, Part 1	Contestant's Choice	"Dreams"	Brandi Carlile	N/A	Advanced
Hollywood Round, Part 2	Group Performance	"Mama's Broken Heart"	Miranda Lambert	N/A	Advanced
Hollywood Round, Part 3	Contestant's Choice	"Don't Ever Let Your Children Grow Up"	Maddie Poppe	N/A	Advanced
Showcase Round/Top 50	Contestant's Choice	"Me and Bobby McGee"	Roger Miller	N/A	Advanced
Top 24 Solo/Duet	Contestant's Choice	Solo "Brand New Key"	Melanie	3	Advanced
Top 24 Solo/Duet	Contestant's Choice	Duet "Bubbly" (with Colbie Caillat)	Colbie Caillat	3	Advanced
Top 14	Contestant's Choice	"Homeward Bound"	Simon & Garfunkel	10	Safe
Top 14	Victory Song	"Walk Like an Egyptian"	The Bangles	1	Safe
Top 10	Disney	"The Bare Necessities" (from The Jungle Book)	Phil Harris	1	Safe
Top 7	Prince	"Nothing Compares 2 U"	Sinéad O'Connor	7	Safe
Top 7	Birth Year	"If It Makes You Happy"	Sheryl Crow	13	Safe
Top 5	Carrie Underwood	"I Told You So"	Randy Travis	5	Safe
Top 5	Mother's Day Songs	"God Only Knows"	The Beach Boys	10	Safe
Finale	Winner's Single	"Going Going Gone"	Maddie Poppe	3	Winner
Finale	Reprise Song	"Don't Ever Let Your Children Grow Up"	Maddie Poppe	6	Winner
Finale	Hometown Dedication	"Landslide"	Fleetwood Mac	9	Winner

American Idol season 16 non-competition performances
Episode	Song	Collaborator(s)	Original Artist
Results Show	"All Night Long (All Night)"	Lionel Richie and Top 10	Lionel Richie
Results Show	"Meant to Be"	Bebe Rexha, Caleb Lee Hutchinson, and Gabby Barrett	Bebe Rexha featuring Florida Georgia Line
Results Show	"Rainbow Connection"	Kermit the Frog	Kermit the Frog
Results Show	"Somewhere Over the Rainbow/ What a Wonderful World"	Caleb Lee Hutchinson	Judy Garland; Israel Kamakawiwo'ole

=== 2019–present: Whirlwind and Christmas From Home ===
Following her American Idol victory, Poppe had 42 days to complete a record. On May 17, 2019, Poppe released her second studio album, Whirlwind. She appeared on the seventeenth season of American Idol on April 21 to advertise her new album; however, the show cut to commercial before she was able to mention it. The album's third single, "Made You Miss", debuted at number 39 on the US Adult Top 40 chart and peaked at number 21. The album's fourth single, "Not Losing You", debuted at number 37 on the US Adult Top 40 on October 12 and peaked at number 26.

Poppe joined Ingrid Michaelson on the Dramatic Tour in the United States from October 3 to 29, 2019. On November 20, 2020, Poppe independently released her holiday EP, Christmas From Home. She went on the Maddie Poppe's Acoustic Christmas tour in Iowa from December 4 to 19, 2020, across the United States in December 2021, and an Iowa leg in 2022. The tour evolved into an annual Christmas show at the Paramount Theatre in Cedar Rapids, Iowa.

Poppe departed from her folk-Americana roots with a series of independent non-album singles in 2022 and 2023. On April 29, 2022, she released the single "One That Got Away", which was described as a turn towards jazz and funk sounds. The music video, which released the following month, featured Poppe as an escaped convict and Hutchinson as a detective. Poppe then released "Peace of Mind", a drum- and guitar-backed ballad, on August 12, and "Screw You a Little Bit", which she described as more honest than her album Whirlwind, on March 31, 2023.

On May 2, 2022, Poppe and Huchinson returned to the American Idol stage to perform "Islands in the Stream" by Kenny Rogers and Dolly Parton, as part of The Great Idol Reunion 20th anniversary special. Poppe was a surprise celebrity guest on The Masked Singer Tour, in Omaha, Nebraska, on May 28.

Poppe set off on a self-titled nationwide tour in the summer of 2023, with support from fellow Idol alum Megan Danielle. Preceding the tour, she reported that she was under new management and was anticipating new music in 2024. In September 2023, she performed as the opening act for Joshua Radin on his fall tour.

== Personal life ==
Prior to the results of the sixteenth season American Idol finale, fellow finalist Caleb Lee Hutchinson announced that he and Poppe were dating. In July 2023, Poppe confirmed she was dating Gabe Burdulis, a singer-songwriter and guitarist.

== Discography ==
=== Studio albums ===
Title	Details
Songs from the Basement	Released: June 20, 2016; Label: independent; Format: CD, digital download
Whirlwind	Released: May 17, 2019; Label: Hollywood, 19; Format: CD, digital download

=== Extended plays ===
Title	Details
Christmas from Home	Released: November 20, 2020; Label: independent; Format: CD, digital download

=== Singles ===
Title	Year	Peak chart positions		Album
Title	Year	US Adult Pop	US Digital	Album
"Going, Going, Gone"	2018	—	13	Non-album singles
"Keep On Movin' On"	2018	—	—	Non-album singles
"First Aid Kit"	2019	—	—	Whirlwind
"Little Things"	2019	—	—	Whirlwind
"Made You Miss"	2019	21	—	Whirlwind
"Not Losing You"	2019	26	—	Whirlwind
"One That Got Away"	2022	—	—	Non-album singles
"Peace of Mind"	2022	—	—	Non-album singles
"Screw You a Little Bit"	2023	—	—	Non-album singles
"Good Enough to Let You Go"	2023	—	—	Non-album singles
"SOS I'm In Love"	2023	—	—	Non-album singles
"Rainbow Connection" (Kermit the Frog cover)	2025	—	—	Non-album singles

==== Promotional singles ====
Title	Year	Album
"Have Yourself a Merry Little Christmas"	2018	Non-album singles
"Rockin' Around the Christmas Tree"	2018	Non-album singles

==== As featured artist ====
Title	Year	Album
"Bring It On Home" (with American Authors and Phillip Phillips)	2019	Non-album single
"Neverland (version two)" (with Joshua Radin)	2023	though the world will tell me so, vol. 2

== Awards and nominations ==
Year	Award	Category	Nominated work	Result	Ref
2018	People's Choice Awards	Competition Contestant of 2018	American Idol	Won	
2018	Talent Recap Fan Choice Awards	Favorite Reality TV Competition Contestant of 2018	American Idol	Won	

== Tours ==
- The Dramatic Tour (2019) with Ingrid Michaelson
- The Fall Tour (2023) with Joshua Radin

== See also ==
- List of Idols winners
