= The SteelDrivers (album) =

2008 debut album by The SteelDrivers

Studio album by The SteelDrivers
- Released: January 15, 2008
- Genre: Country, bluegrass
- Length: 35:50
- Label: Rounder Records
- Producer: Luke Wooten; The Steeldrivers

The SteelDrivers chronology
The SteelDrivers (2008)	Reckless (2010)

The SteelDrivers is the debut album by The SteelDrivers. It was released by Rounder Records on January 15, 2008.

== Critical reception ==
Professional ratings
Review scores
Source	Rating
PopMatters	7/10 stars
Slant Magazine	3.5/5 stars

Cybergrass writes, "When originally released, the album peaked at #57 on the Billboard Country Albums chart, and garnered a GRAMMY® nomination for Best Country Performance by a Duo or Group with Vocals for "Blue Side of the Mountain.""

Robert Short of PopMatters gives the album 7 out of a possible 10 stars and says, "After road-testing the material in clubs and festivals, the band is finally ready to unveil their debut set of eleven originals. Amongst its other industry vets, fiddler Tammy Rogers, mandolin player Mike Henderson, bassist Mike Fleming, and banjo player Richard Bailey, these players have performed and recorded with everyone from Al Green to Waylon Jennings, Reba McEntire to Bo Diddley."

Jonathan Keefe of Slant Magazine gives the album 3½ out of a possible 5 stars and writes, "the self-titled debut for The SteelDrivers, a five-piece outfit comprised of veteran Nashville session musicians, is the kind of break from tradition that can bring some much needed new energy to a tired genre."

== Track listing ==
All tracks are written by Chris Stapleton and Mike Henderson, unless otherwise noted.

No.	Title	Writer(s)	Length
1.	"Blue Side of the Mountain"		3:28
2.	"Drinkin' Dark Whiskey"		2:53
3.	"Midnight Train to Memphis"		3:02
4.	"Midnight Tears"	Jerry Salley; Stapleton	2:55
5.	"If You Can't Be Good, Be Gone"		2:30
6.	"If It Hadn't Been for Love"		3:58
7.	"Hear the Willow Cry"	Liz Hengber; Stapleton	2:57
8.	"Sticks That Made Thunder"		4:08
9.	"East Kentucky Home"		2:37
10.	"To Be With You Again"		3:34
11.	"Heaven Sent"	Stapleton; Kevin Welch	3:48
Total length:			35:50

Notes

- Chris Stapleton recorded a solo version of "Midnight Train to Memphis" on his album From A Room: Volume 2 (2017).

== Musicians ==
- Richard Bailey – banjo
- Mike Flemming – bass, vocals
- Tammy Rogers – fiddle, vocals
- Chris Stapleton – guitar, vocals
- Mike Henderson – mandolin

== Production ==
- Mastered by Luke Wooten
- Mixed by Luke Wooten
- Produced by Luke Wooten, The SteelDrivers

Track information and credits verified from the album's liner notes.
