= Sundy Best =

American country duo

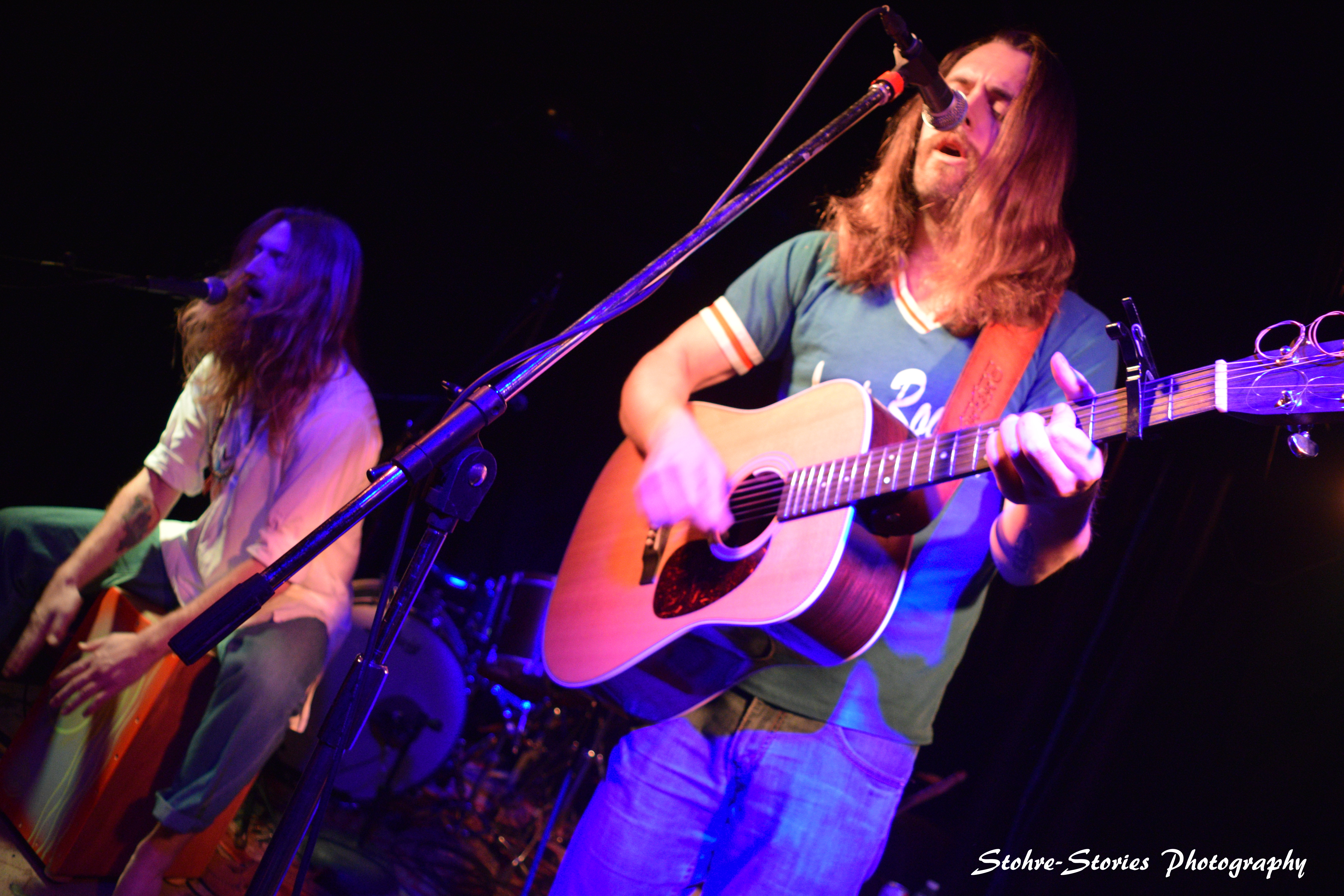
- Kristofer Bentley and Nicholas Jamerson performing at Rumba Cafe in Columbus, OH

Background information
- Origin: Prestonsburg, Kentucky
- Genres: Country, Folk, Rock
- Years active: 2010–2018, 2020-present
- Labels: E1 Music
- Members: Kristofer Bentley; Nicholas Jamerson

Sundy Best is an American country duo formed by Nicholas Jamerson and Kris Bentley from Prestonsburg, Kentucky. Their music is a blend of country, Appalachian folk, bluegrass, rock, soul, and R&B. They released their album Bring Up the Sun in 2014. The duo announced their break-up in March 2018. Since the breakup, Jamerson continued his musical career as a solo artist. In October 2020, the duo announced that they would be reuniting.

== Origin ==
Sundy Best was formed by two friends since elementary school, Nick Jamerson and Kris Bentley, from Prestonsburg in Eastern Kentucky. Both were athletes in college, with Jamerson playing football while at University of Pikeville where he studied history, and Bentley played basketball at Centre College in Danville where he studied English. They formed a duo after college, and moved to Lexington, Kentucky in August 2010. Jamerson performed as the lead vocalist and played the guitar, with Bentley on the cajón drum. Their name referred to the way they pronounce "Sunday best", their best clothing worn in church where they began playing music together on Sundays during their senior year in high school.

== Music career ==
In their first year as a duo, Sundy Best produced an album, Tales, Lies and Exaggerations, which was a demo recorded at home. In December 2011, they raised $15,000 through the crowd-sourcing website Kickstarter to fund their first studio-recorded album. The album, titled Door Without a Screen, was released in the summer of 2012. They were then signed to the E1 Music music label which released a deluxe version of the album on August 27, 2013.

=== 2014: Bring Up the Sun and Salvation City ===
Sundy Best recorded their next album, Bring Up the Sun, which was produced by RS Field. The album features 15 songs, including remakes of previously recorded songs, "Home," "Lilly" and "These Days." The video for "These Days" was released on 11 November 2013. The video for their lead single, "Until I Met You", was released on February 12, 2014.

Bring Up the Sun was released on March 10, 2014. The album reached No. 11 on the Billboard Top Country Albums chart and No. 70 on the Billboard 200 in its debut week, with 5,000 copies sold in the U.S. for the week.

Their third album Salvation City premiered on Rolling Stone on December 1, 2014, and was released for sales on December 2, 2014. The album debuted on the Top Country Albums chart at No.22.

On March 8, 2018, Jamerson announced on Facebook that the duo had broken up and that he would pursue his own project, performing as a solo artist and as part of The Jamersons with his brothers and sister. In October 2020, the duo announced via their Facebook page that they would be reuniting, which Bentley subsequently confirmed in conversation with a reporter.

== Discography ==
=== Albums ===
Title	Album details	Peak chart positions				Sales
Title	Album details	US Country	US	US Heat	US Indie	Sales
Door Without a Screen	Release date: June 2012; Label: Independent, E1 Music; Formats: CD, music download	33	—	7	—	
Bring Up the Sun	Release date: March 4, 2014; Label: E1 Music; Formats: CD, music download	11	70	—	14	US: 13,400
Salvation City	Release date: December 2, 2014; Label: E1 Music; Formats: CD, music download	22	—	—	11	
It's So Good Live	Release date: April 22, 2016; Label: E1 Music; Formats: CD, music download	49	—	24	—	
Almar Sky	Release date: December 16, 2016; Label: ALMAR; Formats: Music download	—	—	—	—	
Feel Good Country	Release date: February 3, 2023; Formats: Streaming					
"—" denotes releases that did not chart

=== Singles ===
- "Home"
- "Lily"
- "These Days"
- "Until I Met You"

=== Music videos ===
Year	Video	Director
2013	"Home"	Coleman Saunders
2013	"Lily"	Coleman Saunders
2013	"Mountain Parkway"	Coleman Saunders
2013	"These Days"	Coleman Saunders
2014	"Until I Met You"	Coleman Saunders
2014	"I Wanna Go Home"	Coleman Saunders
2014	"Lotta Love"	Coleman Saunders
2014	"Southern Boy"	Coleman Saunders
2015	"Do You Wanna Go"	Blake Judd
2015	"My Sweet Thing"	AmericusTrue
2015	"Four Door"	Coleman Saunders
