= Gary Nichols =

American country music singer (born 1978)

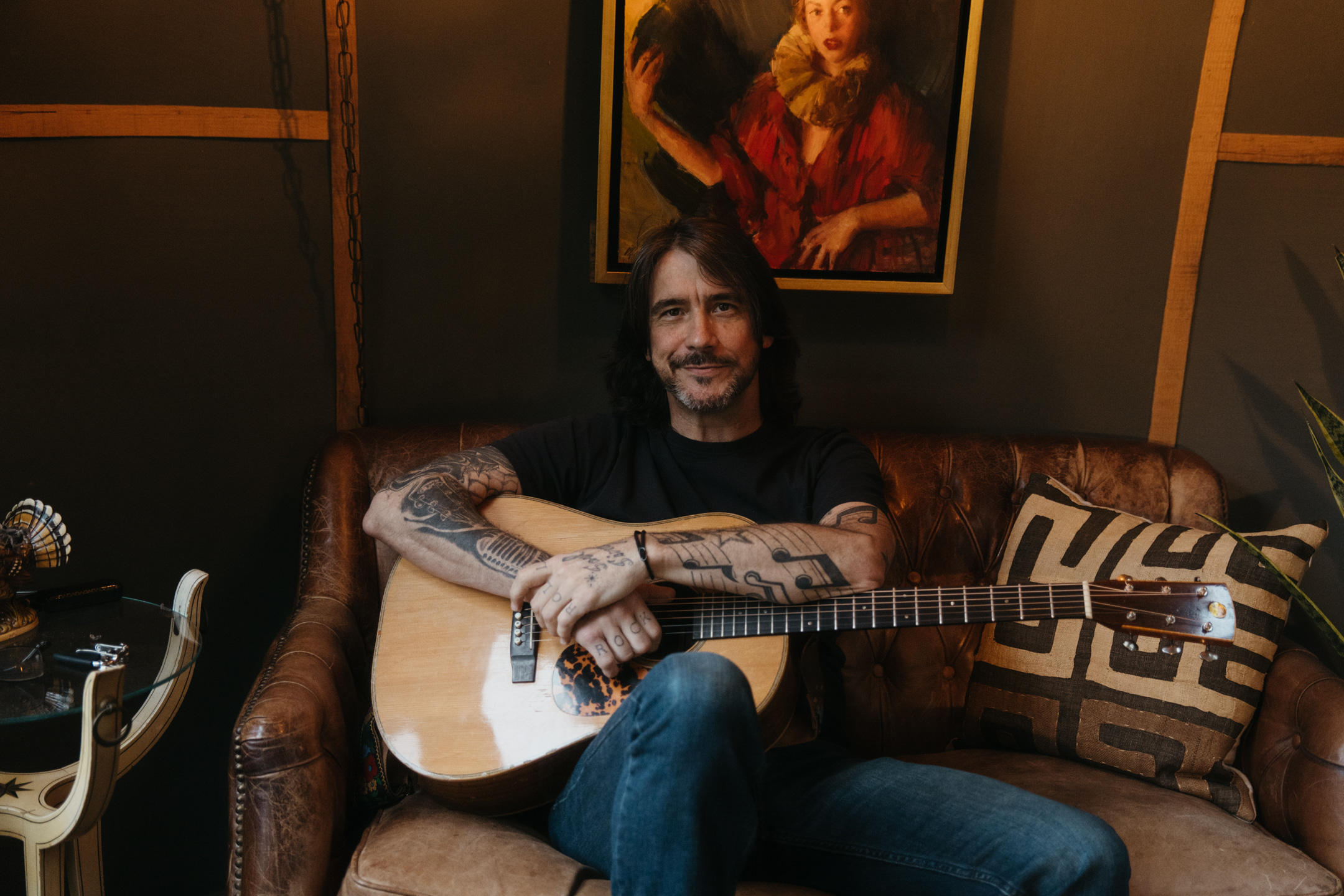

Background information
- Born: August 8, 1978 (age 48)
- Origin: Muscle Shoals, Alabama, United States
- Genre: Country
- Occupation: Singer–songwriter
- Instruments: Vocals, acoustic guitar
- Years active: 1991–present
- Labels: Loomis Nashville, Mercury Nashville, Muscle Shoals Music Group, Merrimack Records
- Formerly of: The SteelDrivers

Gary Nichols (born August 8, 1978) is an American country music singer. Signed to Mercury Nashville in 2006, Nichols made his debut that year with the release of his single "Unbroken Ground", which reached No. 39 on the Billboard Hot Country Songs charts. Following it were the singles "I Can't Love You Anymore" and "Goin' Fast". Nichols never released an album for the label and soon left it.

In April 2010, he replaced Chris Stapleton as the lead singer and guitarist of The SteelDrivers. After seven years with the band during which time the band won the Grammy for 2016 Best Bluegrass Album for The Muscle Shoals Recordings, Gary depart the band in 2017. He released a solo album titled "Field of Plenty" on Merrimack Records the same year. The mostly solo album features Charlie Musselwhite and Spooner Oldham on some tracks.

== Discography ==
=== Studio albums ===
Year	Album details
1994	Subject to Change: Release date: January 17, 1994; Label: Loomis Nashville
2010	The Way We Do It Down South: Release date: September 8, 2010; Label: Muscle Shoals Music Group
2017	Field of Plenty: Release date: April 17, 2017; Label: Merrimack Records

=== Singles ===
Year	Single	Peak positions
Year	Single	US Country
2006	"Unbroken Ground"	39
2006	"I Can't Love You Anymore"	60
2007	"Goin' Fast"	—
"—" denotes releases that did not chart

=== Music videos ===
Year	Video	Director
2006	"Unbroken Ground"	Paul Boyd

=== Games ===
- 2006: The song "Goin' Fast" was featured in NASCAR 07.
