= Cybergrass =

Cybergrass is the first web site dedicated to bluegrass music. The site was created on September 9, 1992, by Bob Cherry. It acquired its current name and trademark in 1995 and rebranded itself as Cybergrass - The Internet's Bluegrass Music Magazine. The site has had numerous facelifts over the years. Beginning as a lyrics site, it progressed into a bluegrass music portal with a variety of features. Today, the site's current configuration is as a daily bluegrass music news site.

The subject of the publication has always been bluegrass music. The site has been an innovator in music web sites. Cybergrass was the first website to ever carry a music awards show—the Grammys in 1996 and has webcast the International Bluegrass Music Awards show for every year they have been available from the International Bluegrass Music Association. The site was also the first Broadcast Music Incorporated (BMI) licensed web site (1995). In 2010, Cybergrass was listed as an IBMA bluegrass resource.

Cybergrass editorial content continues to profile artists, announce new releases, announce new events and products of interest to a bluegrass music audience. The site removed all music content when DMCA was written but continues their promotion of anything surrounding the music.

After the release of O Brother Where Art Thou, there has been a resurgence of interest in the music of Bill Monroe. More than a thousand bluegrass music related web sites are online around the world today.
