= The SteelDrivers =

American bluegrass band

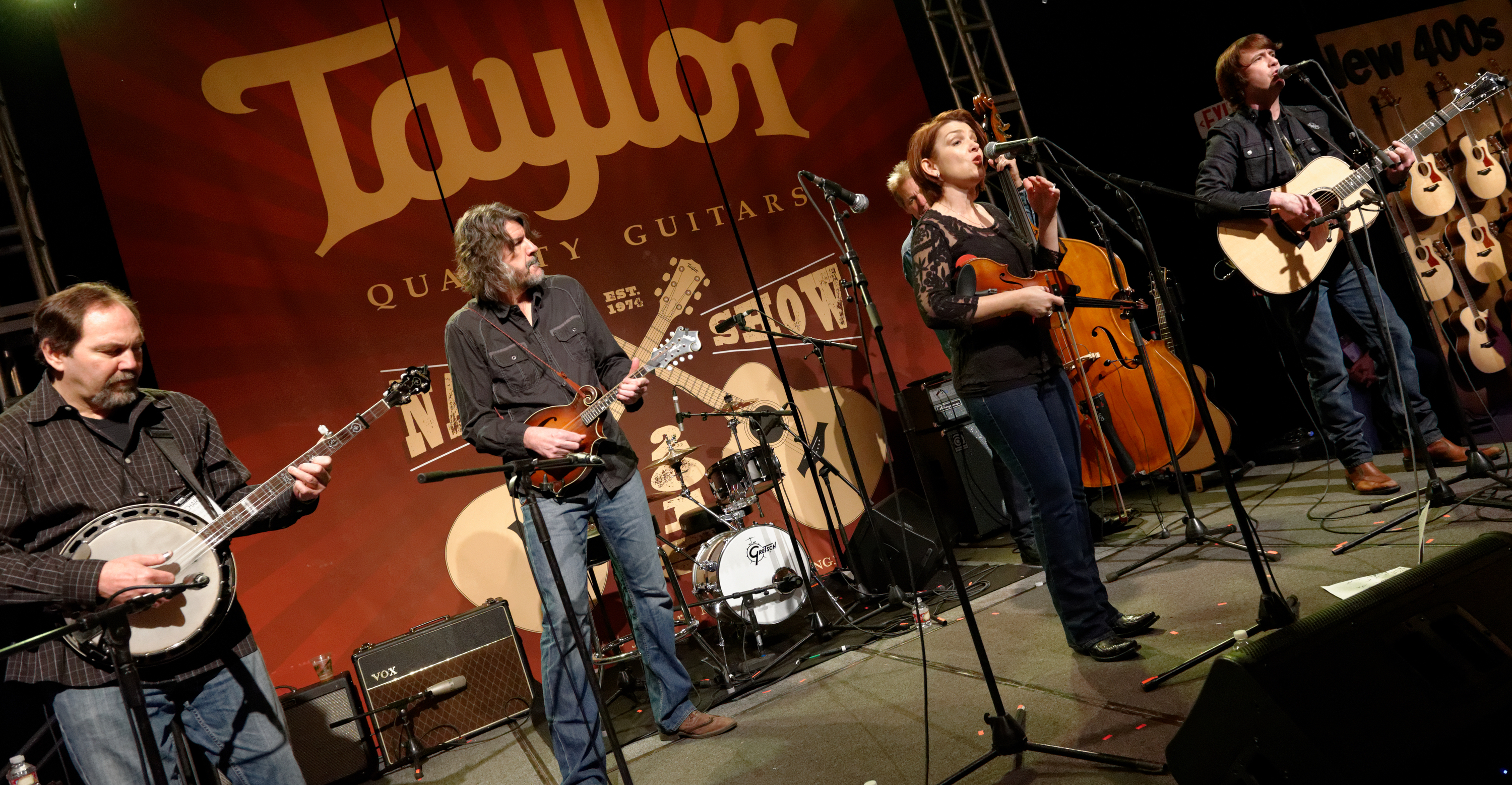
- The SteelDrivers performing on the Taylor Guitars showroom stage, on January 22, 2015

Background information
- Origin: Nashville, Tennessee, U.S.
- Genre: Bluegrass
- Years active: 2005–present
- Label: Rounder
- Members: Richard Bailey; Matt Dame; Mike Fleming; Tammy Rogers; Brent Truitt
- Past members: Chris Stapleton; Mike Henderson; Gary Nichols; Kelvin Damrell
- Website: thesteeldrivers.com

The SteelDrivers are a bluegrass band from Nashville, Tennessee. Members include fiddler Tammy Rogers, bassist Mike Fleming, guitarist/vocalist Matt Dame, mandolinist Brent Truitt, and banjoist Richard Bailey. Past members include Kelvin Damrell, Chris Stapleton, Gary Nichols, and Mike Henderson. The band has recorded four albums on the Rounder Records label and one independent live album recorded at The Station Inn. The band has received several Grammy nominations and won a Grammy for the album The Muscle Shoals Recordings.

== Career ==
After playing at many bluegrass festivals, The SteelDrivers signed to Rounder Records in 2007 and released a self-titled debut the following year, featuring new lead singer Chris Stapleton. The album peaked at No. 57 on the U.S. Billboard Top Country Albums chart. The group was nominated for a Grammy Award in 2009 for Best Country Performance by a Duo or Group with Vocals for their song "Blue Side of the Mountain." In 2010, the group received two nominations for its second album, Reckless. The album has been nominated for both Best Bluegrass Album and Best Country Performance by a Duo or Group with Vocal for the song "Where Rainbows Never Die".

Stapleton announced in April 2010, that he was leaving the band to focus on raising his family. He was replaced by former Mercury Records artist Gary Nichols on lead vocals and guitar. In December 2011, founding member Mike Henderson left the band. Henderson was replaced by Nashville musician and record producer Brent Truitt. In 2015, the new lineup received a Grammy Award for Best Bluegrass Album for its new album The Muscle Shoals Recordings. In 2018, Kelvin Damrell became the band's new lead singer and debuted on the 2020 release Bad for You. In July 2021, Damrell announced his departure from the band, with the band simultaneously announcing the addition of Matt Dame as lead singer.

== Band members ==
Current members

- Matt Dame – lead vocals, guitar (2021–present)
- Richard Bailey – banjo (2007–present)
- Mike Fleming – bass (2007–present)
- Tammy Rogers – fiddle (2007–present)
- Brent Truitt – mandolin (2012–present)

Former members

- Chris Stapleton – lead vocals, guitar (2007–2010)
- Gary Nichols – lead vocals, guitar (2010–2017)
- Kelvin Damrell – lead vocals, guitar (2018–2021)
- Mike Henderson – mandolin (2007–2011)

Former touring members

- Adam Wakefield – lead vocals, guitar (2017)

== Discography ==
=== Albums ===
Title	Album details	Peak chart positions			Sales
Title	Album details	US Grass	US Country	US Heat	Sales
The SteelDrivers	Release date: January 15, 2008; Label: Rounder Records	2	57	—	
Reckless	Release date: September 7, 2010; Label: Rounder Records	2	—	17	
Hammer Down	Release date: February 5, 2013; Label: Rounder Records	1	—	6	
The Muscle Shoals Recordings	Release date: June 16, 2015; Label: Rounder Records	1	—	5	
Bad for You	Release date: February 7, 2020; Label: Rounder Records	1	—	—	US: 2,700
Tougher Than Nails	Release date: September 8, 2023; Label: Gaither Music Group	—	—	—	
Outrun	Release date: May 23, 2025; Label: Sun Records	—	—	—	
"—" denotes releases that did not chart

=== Other certified songs ===
Title	Year	Certifications	Album
"If It Hadn't Been For Love"	2008	RIAA: Platinum	The Steeldrivers
"Where Rainbows Never Die"	2010	RIAA: Platinum	Reckless
"Ghosts of Mississippi"	2010	RIAA: Gold	Reckless

=== Music videos ===
2013	Blue Side of the Mountain	
2013	"I'll Be There"	Dycee Wildman
2013	"Wearin' a Hole"	Dycee Wildman
2015	"Long Way Down"	

== Awards and nominations ==
=== Grammy awards ===
Year	Nominee / work	Award	Result
2009	"Blue Side of the Mountain"	Best Country Performance by a Duo or Group with Vocal	Nominated
2011	Reckless	Best Bluegrass Album	Nominated
2011	"Where Rainbows Never Die"	Best Country Performance by a Duo or Group with Vocal	Nominated
2015	The Muscle Shoals Recordings	Best Bluegrass Album	Won
2025	Outrun	Best Bluegrass Album	Nominated
