= One More Time: The MCA Recordings =

Compilation album by Kelly Willis
- Released: 2000
- Genre: Country
- Label: MCA Records
- Producer: Tony Brown, John Guess, Don Was, and John Leventhal

Kelly Willis chronology
What I Deserve (1999)	One More Time: The MCA Recordings (2000)	Easy (2002)

Professional ratings
Review scores
Source	Rating
Allmusic	4.5/5 stars

One More Time is a compilation of songs from the first three albums by Kelly Willis, when she recorded with her first label, MCA Records. Of the fourteen tracks, three are from Well Travelled Love, five are from Bang Bang, and five are from Kelly Willis. The main reason that die-hard Willis fans may have for getting this album is "Little Honey," which has never appeared on a Willis album before, but was originally on MCA's Thelma and Louise movie soundtrack album from 1991.

== Track listing ==
1. "Looking for Someone Like You" (Paul Kennerley/Kevin Welch) – 3:11
2. "River of Love" (Mas Palermo) – 2:52
3. "I Don't Want to Love You (But I Do)" (Kennerley) – 3:20
4. "Sincerely (Too Late to Turn Back Now)" (Steve Earle/Robert Earl Keen) – 4:40
5. "Baby Take a Piece of My Heart" (Kostas/Kelly Willis) – 3:44
6. "The Heart That Love Forgot" (Kostas/Palermo) – 3:08
7. "I'll Try Again" (Jim Lauderdale/Monte Warden) – 2:57
8. "Hidden Things" (Paul Kelly) – 4:08
9. "Little Honey" (Dave Alvin/John Doe) – 4:44
10. "Heaven's Just a Sin Away" (Jerry Gillespie) – 2:31
11. "Get Real" (Willis/John Leventhal) – 2:56
12. "Take It All Out on You" (Bruce Robison/Palermo) – 2:33
13. "I Know Better Now" (Lauderdale) – 3:48
14. "Whatever Way the Wind Blows" (Marshall Crenshaw) – 3:23
