= Fading Fast =

EP by Kelly Willis
- Released: 1996
- Genre: Country
- Label: A&M

Kelly Willis chronology
Kelly Willis (1993)	Fading Fast (1996)	What I Deserve (1999)

Professional ratings
Review scores
Source	Rating
Allmusic	4/5 stars

Fading Fast is a rare EP by country music singer Kelly Willis. A&M Records originally released the CD as a promotional item, then later issued a limited number of copies for sale only in Texas. It features recordings with Jay Farrar of Son Volt, and with the band 16 Horsepower. One of its tracks, "He Don't Care About Me," was written by Willis's husband, country music singer Bruce Robison.

== Track listing ==
1. "Fading Fast" (John Leventhal/Kelly Willis) – 2:56
2. "What World Are You Living In?" (Gary Louris/Willis) – 3:08
3. "He Don't Care About Me" (Bruce Robison) – 2:32
4. "Aren't I True?" (Willis) – 2:23
