= Translated from Love =

Studio album by Kelly Willis
- Released: June 26, 2007
- Genre: Country
- Length: 41:13
- Language: English
- Label: Rykodisc
- Producer: Chuck Prophet

Kelly Willis chronology
Happy Holidays (2003)	Translated from Love (2007)	Cheater's Game (2013)

We did [have fun recording], and that’s all [producer] Chuck [Prophet]. He’s so fun. He’s just a genius, musically. He just really lives and breathes music. He played guitar on What I Deserve and Easy, but this is the first time he was in the producer’s seat, and I just love his instincts. His direction, I think, brought a lot of what you’re talking about to this project. And you know, Easy was the last record that I did, and I’ve been doing that material for the last five years. And I love it, but it’s just so laid back. I just really felt like going off and having some fun.

—Kelly Willis on recording Translated from Love

Translated from Love is a 2007 studio album by American country musician Kelly Willis. The album came after a long hiatus, received positive reviews by critics, and placed on several charts.

== Reception ==
According to the review aggregator Metacritic, Translated from Love received "generally favorable reviews" based on a weighted average score of 75 out of 100 from 10 critic scores. Editors at AllMusic rated this album 4 out of 5 stars, with critic Thom Jurek writing that "this is, in many ways, as slick as her MCA records, though it is punchier, rocks a little harder, and feels like it was geared for more open-minded country radio stations" and continues that Chuck Prophet is "a perfect producer for getting what an artist wants out of a tune", summarizing that "it's a winner, a solid, consistently crafted "new country" record that wears rock & roll proudly on its sleeve". Doug Freeman of The Austin Chronicle gave this album 3 out of 5 stars, writing that the "songs are forged with a more mature fire and relaxed tone" than Willis' previous work. In Entertainment Weekly, Chris Willman scored Translated from Love a B+, calling it "a treat in any emotional language". A review in No Depression ended, "But the way she follows the metaphors of giving in to the unpredictable nature of love, with the feel of someone fully awake to feeling, submits to no translation. She really just sounds just like herself." Rolling Stone's Robert Christgau rated this work 2.5 out of 5 stars, stating that "her good taste tethers her to the old homestead". Jonathan Keefe gave this album 4 out of 5 stars in Slant Magazine, summing up that "While it lacks the thematic focus of its two predecessors (2002’s Easy and 1999’s extraordinary What I Deserve), Translated From Love compensates with its deliberate, measured quirk; it still has the depth her fans have come to expect, but it’s Willis’s coolest record yet". Translated from Love received an 8 out of 10 at PopMatters where it was characterized as "a kick in the pants compared to the relatively mellow Easy". Catherine P. Lewis of The Washington Post wrote that "Willis's emergence from [a] hiatus feels less than focused, as Translated presents a scattered collection of styles and tempos that never quite jell".

== Track listing ==
1. "Nobody Wants to Go to the Moon Anymore" (Damon Bramblett) – 2:53
2. "Sweet Little One" (Chuck Prophet and Kelly Willis) – 3:55
3. "Don’t Know Why" (Prophet, Jules Shear, Willis) – 3:37
4. "Teddy Boys" (Willis) – 2:44
5. "Losing You" (Prophet and Willis) – 3:34
6. "Too Much to Lose" (Prophet, Shear, and Willis) – 4:33
7. "The More That I'm Around You" (Shear) – 3:34
8. "Sweet Sundown" (Bramblett) – 3:01
9. "Success" (David Bowie, Ricky Gardiner, and Iggy Pop) – 3:44
10. "Stone’s Throw Away" (Greg Leisz, Prophet, and Willis) – 4:18
11. "I Must Be Lucky" (Prophet, Shear, and Willis) – 3:01
12. "Translated from Love" (Stephen Yerkey) – 2:19

== Personnel ==
- Kelly Willis – vocals, harmony vocals on "Sweet Little One" and "Losing You"
- Stephanie Ames Asbell – viola on "Sweet Little One", "Losing You", "Too Much to Lose", and "Stone’s Throw Away"
- Adam Ayan – audio mastering at Gateway Mastering
- Claude Bernard – backing vocals on "Sweet Sundown"
- Mike Hardwick – dobro on "I Must Be Lucky"
- Andrew Hernandez – audio engineering
- Phil Hill – audio engineering
- Max Johnston – backing vocals on "Sweet Sundown"
- Paul Q. Kolderie – engineering, mixing
- Keith Langford – backing vocals on "Sweet Sundown"
- Greg Leisz – guitar on "Teddy Boys"; slide guitar on "Nobody Wants to Go to the Moon Anymore"; 12-string acoustic guitar on "Sweet Little One" and "Too Much to Lose"; Fender Jazzmaster guitar on "Don't Know Why"; 12-string guitar on "Losing You", "The More I'm Around You", and "Sweet Sundown"; banjo on "Losing You"; pedal steel guitar on "Losing You" and "Stone's Throw Away"; acoustic guitar on "Too Much to Lose", "Stone's Throw Away", and "Translated from Love"; electric guitar on "Success" and "I Must Be Lucky"; backing vocals on "Stone's Throw Away"
- John Ludwick – bass guitar on "Nobody Wants to Go to the Moon Anymore", "Sweet Little One", "Don’t Know Why", "Teddy Boys", "Too Much to Lose", "The More That I'm Around You", "Stone’s Throw Away", and "I Must Be Lucky", upright bass on "Sweet Sundown"
- Leigh Mahoney – violin on "Sweet Little One", "Losing You", "Too Much to Lose", and "Stone’s Throw Away"
- Sara Nelson – cello on "Sweet Little One", "Losing You", "Too Much to Lose", and "Stone’s Throw Away"
- Marc Pisapia – drums on "Nobody Wants to Go to the Moon Anymore", "Sweet Little One", "Don’t Know Why", "Teddy Boys", "Too Much to Lose" "The More That I'm Around You", "Sweet Sundown", "Stone’s Throw Away", and "I Must Be Lucky"; percussion on "Don't Know Why" and "Success"
- Chuck Prophet – guitar on "Nobody Wants to Go to the Moon Anymore", "Don't Know Why", "Teddy Boys"; Gretsch Country Gentleman on "Sweet Little One" and "Too Much to Lose"; mandoguitar on "Don't Know Why" and "Stone's Throw Away"; electric guitar on "Losing You", "The More That I'm Around You", and "Success"; baritone guitar on "Losing You", "Success", and "I Must Be Lucky"; backing vocals on "Stone's Throw Away", "I Must Be Lucky", and "Translated from Love"; acoustic guitar on "Sweet Sundown" and "Translated from Love"; harmonica on "Sweet Sundown"; production
- Michael Ramos – Hammond B3 organ on "Nobody Wants to Go to the Moon Anymore", "Don’t Know Why", and "Sweet Sundown"; Moog synthesizer on "Nobody Wants to Go to the Moon Anymore", "Teddy Boys", and "The More That I'm Around You"; piano on "Don't Know Why" and "Losing You"; Wurlitzer electric piano on "Don't Know Why"; ARP String Ensemble synthesizer on "Sweet Little One"; Vox Continental organ on "Success"; organ on "I Must Be Lucky"; accordion on "Translated from Love"; string arrangement
- Bruce Robison – backing vocals on "Too Much to Lose", and "The More That I'm Around You"
- Charlie Robison – backing vocals on "Sweet Sundown"
- Kevin Russell – backing vocals on "Sweet Sundown"
- Tracy Seeger – violin on "Sweet Little One", "Losing You", "Too Much to Lose", and "Stone’s Throw Away"
- Jules Shear – backing vocals on "Don't Know Why", "The More That I'm Around You", and "Translated from Love"
- Jimmy Smith – backing vocals on "Sweet Sundown"
- Tosca String Quartet – strings on "Sweet Little One", "Losing You", "Too Much to Lose", and "Stone's Throw Away"
- J. J. Weisler – audio engineering

== Chart performance ==
Translated from Love placed on several Billboard charts: reaching 46 on the Top Country Albums, 12 on Top Heatseekers, and 37 on Independent Albums.

== See also ==
- 2007 in country music
- List of 2007 albums
