= Easy (Kelly Willis album) =

Studio album by Kelly Willis
- Released: 2002
- Genre: Country
- Label: Rykodisc
- Producer: Kelly Willis, Gary Paczosa

Kelly Willis chronology
What I Deserve (1999)	Easy (2002)	Translated from Love (2007)

Easy is the fifth album by Kelly Willis. It was released on Rykodisc in 2002. The album went to number 29 on Top Country Albums.

== Critical reception ==
Professional ratings
Review scores
Source	Rating
AllMusic	4/5 stars
The Austin Chronicle	3/4 stars
BBC Music	favorable
Exclaim!	favorable
Rolling Stone	3/5 stars
The Village Voice	(choice cut)

Soon after Easy was released, NPR's Meredith Ochs said that Willis "has found her true style" on the album. Richard Harrington, a music critic for the Washington Post, ranked Easy as his 9th favorite album of 2002, writing that "Willis's originals, including the hurtin' anthems "If I Left You" and "Easy (As Falling Apart)," are among her best yet."

== Track listing ==
1. "If I Left You" (Kelly Willis) – 3:09
2. "Easy (as Falling Apart)" (Willis) – 4:12
3. "What Did You Think" (Bruce Robison) – 3:34
4. "You Can't Take It with You" (Paul Kelly) – 3:03
5. "Getting to Me" (Willis, Gary Louris) – 4:32
6. "Don't Come the Cowboy with Me Sonny Jim!" (Kirsty MacColl) – 3:57
7. "Wait Until Dark" (Willis, John Leventhal) – 3:41
8. "Find Another Fool" (Marcia Ball) – 3:14
9. "Not What I Had in Mind" (Willis) – 4:07
10. "Reason to Believe" (Willis) – 3:17

== Personnel ==
- Chris Burns – assistant engineer
- Floyd Domino – piano
- Tony Edwards – glockenspiel
- Amy Farris – violin, viola, background vocals
- Rafael Gayol – drums
- Vince Gill – background vocals
- Paul Glasse – mandolin
- Robert Hadley – mastering
- Thomas Johnson – assistant engineer
- Steven Jurgensmeyer – design
- Alison Krauss – background vocals
- John Ludwick – bass guitar
- Lloyd Maines – electric guitar, steel guitar
- Ian McLagan – piano, Hammond organ, Wurlitzer
- Gary Paczosa – producer, engineer, mixing
- Chuck Prophet – acoustic guitar, electric guitar, wurlitzer
- Bruce Robison – background vocals
- Doug Sax – mastering
- Mellissa Schleicher – make-up, hair stylist
- Rolf Sieker – banjo
- Mark Spencer – acoustic guitar, piano, electric guitar, bonang, national steel guitar, baritone guitar
- Chris Thile – mandolin
- Geoff Travis – executive producer
- Dan Tyminski – background vocals
- Dana Tynan – photography
- Kelly Willis – lead vocals, producer, background vocals

== Chart performance ==
Chart (2002)	Peak position
U.S. Billboard Top Country Albums	29
U.S. Billboard Top Heatseekers	17
U.S. Billboard Top Independent Albums	19
