= Mat Callahan =

American songwriter

Mat Callahan (born Mathew Kerner, July 14, 1951, San Francisco, California) is an American musician, author, songwriter, activist, music producer and engineer.

== Biography ==
=== Early life ===
Callahan's father, William Kerner, was a leader of the international peace movement following WWII, joining with Paul Robeson and other notable figures in supporting a non-belligerent US foreign policy particularly in regards to the Soviet Union and China. William Kerner died of myasthenia gravis in 1954. Mathew's mother remarried in 1956 becoming the wife of longshoreman Jerome Callahan. Mat henceforth used the surname Callahan.

He spent his childhood at Peters Wright Creative Dance, founded by his grandaunt, Anita Peters, and her husband Dexter Wright in 1912. His grandmother (Anita's youngest sister), Lenore Job, also a choreographer, dancer and teacher, was the director of the school when Callahan was born. His mother, Judy Job, followed her mother's lead also pursuing choreography, dancing and teaching. Peters Wright Creative Dance was a direct descendant of the movement inspired by Isadora Duncan. New attitudes towards, women, education and society were embodied in this approach whose influence continued to spread during the 20th century as Modern Dance. From childhood to adolescence, Callahan studied and performed at Peters Wright. His last dance performance was in Charles Weidman's Christmas Oratorio presented on the altar of newly completed Grace Cathedral in San Francisco in 1965.

In 1964, exposure to the sounds of rock 'n' roll culminated in Callahan taking up guitar and starting the first of many bands. He began working with the San Francisco Mime Troupe and co-founded the Mime Troupe-sponsored band, Red Rock. This was followed by Prairie Fire, a militant duet that performed all over the U.S., in conjunction with innumerable campaigns and organizations fighting suffering and injustice. During this time, he became involved with the Black Panthers and other revolutionaries, and refused induction into the U.S. Army. After Prairie Fire, Callahan started a band called the Looters.

=== The Looters ===
The Looters began as a funky, political rock band playing in the legendary underground bohemian hang-out The Offensive, in the Mission District of San Francisco (where most of the original band members lived). The band grew to become a popular, critically renowned, musical trailblazer and led the Bay Area's “worldbeat” musical movement in the 1980s.

In 1983, the Looters were invited to play several dates in Nicaragua by the Association of Sandinista Cultural Workers and the Managua television station, being the first U.S. rock band to play there after the revolution. They headlined a stadium show in front of over 28,000 people in Managua, and returned home to further embrace a style of rock music influenced by “world” rhythms and beats.

In 1986, the Looters toured Europe, supporting their first EP on Alternative Tentacles records, a label founded by iconic punk rocker Jello Biafra of the Dead Kennedys. The EP won a Bay Area Music Award “Bammie” for “Best Independent Album”. Callahan became established as the group's lead singer and songwriter, and remained in that capacity throughout the bands’ run. By happenstance, Island Records’ head Chris Blackwell heard the Looters' EP playing in a New York record store and tracked the band down and signed them. The result was the release of Flashpoint on Island Records in 1987, nudging the band into mainstream awareness.

Elements of reggae, rock, funk and afro-caribbean rhythms shaped the Looters' sound. The band continued playing at unlicensed venues as well as major concerts, such as opening for the Grateful Dead's New Year's Eve shows at the Oakland (CA) Coliseum with the Neville Brothers. They added Canada and Europe to their regular tour schedule and became a consistent touring act.

==== Komotion International ====
Also in 1986, Callahan co-founded the artists’ collective Komotion International, an innovative member – run nightclub, gallery, studio, and widely read magazine, which Callahan wrote for and edited. Komotion became an important and fertile social and political focus for the Mission District community and for San Francisco in general. In musical history, it became an incubator and spawning ground for such artists as Primus with Les Claypool, The Disposable Heroes of Hiphoprisy with Michael Franti and Charlie Hunter, and Consolidated. Artists from many continents utilized Komotion's recording studio and support membership to create lasting works. For more than a decade, Komotion was a center for opposition and creativity centered in the political hotbed of San Francisco. Early on Callahan composed the Komotion Kredo:

Because

Because we celebrate life and battle
Because we are not satisfied
Because it is up to us
Because we love to sing and dance
Because the pressure is upon us
Because there are governments and borders and cops and courts
Because the boundaries must be broken
Because we are out of control
Because they said we couldn't do it
Because we feel like it

In 1989 the Looters released Sides, an EP on Raizer X Records, with releases Jericho Down and Imago Mundi on Monster Music records following it. Jericho Down was perhaps their most critically acclaimed album, as the band received their second nomination for a “Best Independent Album” Bay Area Music Award, and won “Best Pop Indie Label Release of 1991 by WARD Music Monthly. Larry Canale of CD Review stated they were “a band that’s quietly creating some of the most riveting, relevant world/pop music today” and that in concert “the group is absolutely riveting.” Industry bible Billboard magazine raved about the bands’ “superb musicianship that transcends any single genre.” San Francisco Examiner critic Philip Elwood called the album “a major achievement” and that the band was “a treasure in the music business.”

Imago Mundi, named after Columbus’s book of maps on the 500th anniversary of his “discovery”, turned out to be the band's swan song. Featuring the Tower of Power horn section, the album was a final swing through the musical styles of rock, afrobeat, Cuban, soca and funk. Callahan's songwriting increasingly included multi-part harmonies that created song melodies and “hooks” distinctive to rock music of the day, while focusing lyrically on social and economic justice. Callahan led the band through a final tour with some new band members, but decided to end the band's run soon thereafter.

Summing up the band, Stephen Ostick of the Winnipeg (Canada) Free Press stated, “a set with the Looters remains a one-of-a-kind experience. One can still say with certainty you’ve never seen or heard anything like the Looters.”

=== Solo career ===
Callahan returned to San Francisco to produce projects by artists such as Stephen Yerkey and the Disposable Heroes of Hiphoprisy (Island Records). He was awarded the “Goldie” Award in 1992, which honored “Local Heroes and their contribution to the community” by the San Francisco weekly news magazine the Bay Guardian. He also served as President of the Board of Directors for the Bay Area Center for Arts and Technology, a non-profit arts organization. He formed the band The Wild Bouquet which released two albums and toured in Europe, which led to Callahan's relocation to Switzerland where he lives to this day. After two solo European releases (Testimony, a “greatest hits” compilation and San Francisco), Callahan released his first U.S. solo album A Wild Bouquet (Broken Arrow Records) which featured remastered songs from the out-of-print Wild Bouquet albums along with a new tract introducing popular Swiss vocalist Yvonne Moore to U.S. audiences. The album also featured musicians Les Claypool (Primus), Joe Gore (P.J. Harvey) and Brain (Tom Waits).

In 1999, Callahan wrote and produced Yvonne Moore's second album Between You and I and went on to produce and write songs for her subsequent releases Nomad and Put Out the Trash. This grew into a performing collaboration between the two and ultimately the recording and release of Welcome in 2007. On Welcome, Callahan's acoustic guitar was the only instrumental accompaniment to the duo's vocals. Labeled “new folk” music, its “back porch” feel was far from the global arrangements and big productions of The Looters. Also in 2007, Callahan produced the album Nectar by his daughter, singer Shannon Callahan, in Berlin, Germany. Callahan and Moore released Burn the Boogeyman, their follow up to Welcome in 2009. In 2022, Callahan and his partner, Yvonne Moore, released It Is Right to Rebel.

=== Books ===
Callahan's lyrics have always been a significant focus of his music and acclaim. J.H. Tompkins, music editor of the San Francisco Bay Guardian stated that Callahan “writes lyrics as rich in allegory and purpose as anything you’ll run into this side of the Old Testament” and that “he just can’t help but write beautiful songs”. So it was an obvious extension to see his lyrics comprise the book Testimony (Freedom Voices), a collaboration with Swiss artist and illustrator Mariann Muller. Published in 2000, the book featured 40 full color reproductions of Muller's paintings combined with the text of Callahan's songs from the Looters’ and Wild Bouquet albums. Other published works of Callahan are Sex, Death and the Angry Young Man (Times Change Press, 1991) and The Trouble with Music (AK Press, 2005).

The Trouble with Music, a study of (pop) music history, technology, music making and music ownership and copyrights, placed Callahan as a guest lecturer on college campuses throughout the U.S., in 2005. He spoke at institutions such as New York University, Berklee School of Music, Oberlin, Albright, and Stanford Law School. He appeared in forums such as the Brecht Forum and Left Forum in New York City, and in countless bookstores and activist collectives. The book also led him to a friendship and collaboration with folk music pioneer Pete Seeger. Callahan presented Seeger's program for Public Domain reform to the World Intellectual Property Organization (WIPO) conference in Geneva, Switzerland, in 2007.

January, 2017, saw the publication of Callahan's book, The Explosion of Deferred Dreams. (PM Press) The book explores the musical renaissance and social revolution that took place in San Francisco between the years 1965-1975. Providing a critical reexamination of a period which shaped San Francisco's global reputation over the subsequent fifty years, The Explosion of Deferred Dreams explores the dynamic links between the Black Panther Party and Sly and the Family Stone, the United Farm Workers and Santana (band), the Indian Occupation of Alcatraz and the San Francisco Mime Troupe, and the New Left and the Counterculture.

Also in 2017, A Critical Guide to Intellectual Property (Zed Books) was published. This book is an edited collection of essays addressing many aspects of the current debates surrounding copyright, patent and trademark. Callahan is both co-editor, along with Jim Rogers, and contributing author of this volume.

Callahan is also the author of three books accompanied by audio recordings. Songs of Freedom by James Connolly (edited by Mat Callahan with introductions by Theo Dorgan and James Connolly Heron) was published in 2013. Working Class Heroes was published in 2019 to be followed by Songs of Slavery and Emancipation published in 2022. A film documenting the making of Songs of Slavery and Emancipation was also released in 2022.

In 2025, "Bombs Bursting in Air" was released by University Press of Mississippi, where Callahan and others (Suzanne G. Cusick, James E. Dillard, Steven Garabedian, Franz Andres Morrissey, Jim Rogers, Elissa Stroman, Britta Sweers, and Dick Weissman) look at the role of music in the history of the United States.
