= Back Being Blue =

Studio album by Kelly Willis
- Released: May 18, 2018
- Recorded: December 2017
- Studio: The Bunker, Lockhart, Texas, US
- Genre: Country music
- Length: 31:33
- Language: English
- Label: Thirty Tigers
- Producer: Bruce Robison

Kelly Willis chronology
Our Year (2014)	Back Being Blue (2018)	Beautiful Lie (2019)

“[The song "Back Being Blue"], for me, after I wrote it, lightbulbs went off. I knew I needed it to be a little more of a simplistic approach to some sounds that had really inspired me to make music when I first started making music. So I was really, really devoted to ’50s and ’60s sounds, country and rockabilly. And so that was kind of what got me, I got excited all of a sudden.”

—Willis on being inspired to make her first solo album in 11 years.

Back Being Blue is a 2018 studio album by American country musician Kelly Willis, her first solo album of original material in over a decade. The release received positive reviews from critics.

== Reception ==
According to the review aggregator Metacritic, Back Being Blue received "generally favorable reviews" based on a weighted average score of 75 out of 100 from six critic scores. Editors at AllMusic rated this album 4 out of 5 stars, with critic Mark Deming writing that "Willis is just as breezy and delightful as ever" and "has as pure and satisfying a voice as anyone in American music, and her instrument is just as strong and pleasing as ever, with the faint Southern twang and subtle vibrato of her singing adding the ideal emotional punctuation to her performances"; the editorial staff also chose this as one of their favorite country music albums off 2018. In American Songwriter, Hal Horowitz gave this release 3.5 out of 5 stars, writing that it "feels like a natural progression" after having recorded multiple collaborative albums with husband Bruce Robison and "it’s a pleasure to have her talent front and center and not sharing the spotlight". Abby Johntson of The Austin Chronicle rated this album 3 out of 5 stars, stating that this "collection of original songs and covers feels effortlessly of the moment" and that it "proves this overall tonality more relevant than ever, and three decades in – better than even modern – once again brands Kelly Willis as timeless".

Jewly Hight of NPR's First Listen noted several music genres in the songs, from "pillowy, R&B-glazed texture of country-pop in the disco era" to "loping, reflective folk-country" and the author ended stating that "Willis proves that she can have it both ways, and that's a source of pleasure for us listeners, too". An 8.3 out of 10 came from Lee Zimmerman of Paste who praised the songwriting, backing musicians, and noted that the music "may reflect a sadder state of mind, but there’s no denying that it still shines all the same". PopMatters's Elisabeth Woronzoff rated Back Being Blue a 7 out of 10 for being a "welcomed return to the music scene" and states these songs show Willis "musicality and empowered voice" as they "radiate and ultimately outweighs the album’s rough areas".

== Track listing ==
All songs written by Kelly Willis, except where noted.

1. "Back Being Blue" – 3:49
2. "Only You" – 2:38
3. "Fool’s Paradise" – 3:19
4. "Modern World" – 2:27
5. "Freewheeling" – 2:41
6. "Afternoon’s Gone Blind" (Karl Straub) – 3:18
7. "What the Heart Doesn’t Know" – 2:43
8. "I’m a Lover (Not a Fighter)" (Ronnie Light) – 3:03
9. "We’ll Do It for Love Next Time" (Rodney Crowell) – 3:13
10. "Don’t Step Away" (Jeff Rymes and Randy Weeks) – 4:22

== Personnel ==
- Kelly Willis – vocals
- Gina R. Binkley – art direction, cover art, package design
- Joshua Blue – drums, percussion
- John Ludwick – bass guitar on "Fool's Paradise" and "I'm a Lover (Not a Fighter)"
- Steve Mazur – audio engineering
- Dave McNair – audio mastering
- Trevor Nealon – clavinet, Fender Rhodes, piano, Wurlitzer
- Geoff Queen – dobro, acoustic guitar, electric guitar, lap steel guitar, pedal steel guitar
- Bruce Robinson – mandolin on "Fool's Paradise", harmony vocals on "Back Being Blue" and "Fool's Paradise", production
- Abby Robinson – cover photography
- John Michael Schoepf – bass guitar
- Mark Spencer – acoustic guitar, electric guitar
- Jim Vollentine – mixing
- Bonnie Whitmore – harmony vocals on "Back Being Blue" and "Don't Step Away"
- Eleanor Whitmore – mandolin, strings, vocal harmony
- Todd V. Wolfson – inside photography

== See also ==
- 2018 in American music
- 2018 in country music
- List of 2018 albums
