= Dave McNair =

American mastering engineer

- Born: U.S.
- Occupations: Mastering engineer, producer
- Years active: 1982–present

Dave McNair is an American recording and mastering engineer. He was nominated for a Grammy Award for Best Engineered Album, Non-Classical for History by Bokanté in 2024.

== Career ==
McNair has mastered music for Belinda Carlisle, Kelly Willis, Kelly Jones, Iggy Pop, Rain Phoenix, Los Lobos, Tina Turner, Jonas Brothers, Shovels & Rope, David Bowie and others.

== Selected discography ==
Year	Album/song	Artist	Credit
2020	To Love a Fool	Cory Asbury	Mastering engineer
2018	Back Being Blue	Kelly Willis	Mastering engineer
2018	Reckless Love	Cory Asbury	Mastering engineer
2016	Followers	Tenth Avenue North	Mastering engineer
2015	How Can It Be	Lauren Daigle	Mastering engineer
2015	Sound of the Saints	Audio Adrenaline	Mastering engineer
2013	Troubled Days	Seabird	Mastering engineer
2013	The Glorious Unfolding	Steven Curtis Chapman	Mastering engineer
2012	Beautiful Friction	The Fixx	Mastering engineer
2010	Miracle	Nonpoint	Mastering engineer
2010	Broken Dreams Club	Girls	Mastering engineer
2010	I'm Alive, I'm Dreaming	The Ready Set	Mastering engineer
2010	Page One	Steven Page	Mastering engineer
2009	Lines, Vines and Trying Times	Jonas Brothers	Mastering engineer
2009	Memento Mori	Flyleaf	Mastering engineer
2009	Here We Go Again	Demi Lovato	Mastering engineer
2007	Street Fame	Twisted Black	Mastering engineer
1999	What I Deserve	Kelly Willis	Mastering engineer and producer
1993	Real	Belinda Carlisle	Mastering engineer

== Awards and nominations ==
Year	Nominated work	Artist	Category	Role	Award	Result	Ref.
2024	History	Bokanté	Best Engineered Album, Non-Classical	Mastering engineer	Grammy Award	Nominated	
