= Country Sunshine (Bruce Robison album) =

Studio album by Bruce Robison
- Released: 2001
- Genre: Country
- Label: Boar's Nest

Bruce Robison chronology
Long Way Home from Anywhere (1999)	Country Sunshine (2001)	Eleven Stories (2006)

Country Sunshine is the fourth album by American singer/songwriter Bruce Robison. It was released in 2001 on Boar's Nest Records.

== Track listing ==
1. "Can't Get There from Here" – 4:04 (co-write with Allison Moorer)
2. "Bed of Ashes" – 3:25
3. "Blame It on Me" – 3:48
4. "Devil May Care" – 3:14
5. "Valentine" – 4:20
6. "Friendless Marriage" – 3:48
7. "What Would Willie Do" – 5:14
8. "The First Thing About Mary" – 3:47
9. "Sixteen" – 3:27
10. "Anyone But Me" – 3:13
11. "Tonight" – 3:34

== Personnel ==
- Dennis Crouch – bass guitar
- Dan Dugmore – banjo, dobro, acoustic guitar, electric guitar, steel guitar, mandolin
- Kenny Malone – drums, percussion
- Ian McLagan – Hammond organ
- Mickey Raphael – harmonica
- Bruce Robison – lead vocals
- Pete Wasner – piano, electric piano
- Kelly Willis – background vocals

== Releases ==
year	format	label	catalog #
2001	CD	Boar's Nest	25
