= The New World (Bruce Robison album) =

Studio album by Bruce Robison
- Released: 2008
- Recorded: Austin, Texas
- Genre: Country
- Label: Premium

Bruce Robison chronology
It Came From San Antonio (2007)	The New World (2008)

Professional ratings
Review scores
Source	Rating
Austin Chronicle –	4/5 stars
Engine 145 –	3.5/5 stars

The New World is the seventh album by American singer/songwriter Bruce Robison. It was released on September 2, 2008 on Premium Records.

== Track listing ==
All songs written by Bruce Robison, except where noted.

1. “The Hammer” – 2:30
2. “Only” – 2:42
3. “Bad Girl Blues” – 5:13
4. “California 85” – 3:44
5. “Larosse” – 4:16
6. “The New One” (Robison, Marty Muse) – 2:35
7. “Twistin'” – 3:33
8. “Hanging On Hopeless” (Kevin McKinney) – 3:29
9. “She Don't Care” – 2:24
10. “Echo” – 5:32

== Credits ==
=== Musicians ===
- Kevin McKinney – Acoustic, bass, and Harmony Vocals on "Bad Girl Blues" & drums on "Hanging on Hopeless"
- Conrad Choucroun – drums, percussion
- George Reiff – bass, Harmony vocals
- Sweney Tidball – Keys
- Mickey Raphael – Harmonica
- Eleanor Whitmore – Fiddle, Harmony vocals
- Kelly Willis – Harmony vocals
- Pat Manske – drums on "She Don't Care"
- Rolf Sieker – Banjo
- Andrew Nafziger – Electric banjo, Electric guitar
- Chip Dolan – Keys
- Marty Muse – Pedal steel on "Twistin'" and "The New One"
- Lloyd Maines – Pedal steel on "California 85" & "Hanging on Hopeless"
- Judy Arnold, Dion Arnold, & Joy Moore – Harmony vocals on "Bad Girl Blues"
- Carlos Sosa, Fernie Castillo, Ralo Vallejo – Horns
- Paul English – snare drum on "Only"

=== Production ===
- Produced by Bruce Robison
- Engineered by Andrew Hernandez
- Recorded at Premium Recording Service, Austin, Texas

=== Artwork ===
- Art by Jim Franklin
- Art Direction/Design by The Butler Bros.

== Releases ==
year	format	label	catalog #
2008	CD	Premium	002
