= What I Deserve =

Studio album by Kelly Willis
- Released: 1999
- Studio: The Hit Shack (Austin, TX); Cedar Creek (Austin, TX); Congress House (Austin, TX)
- Genre: Country
- Length: 50:11
- Label: Rykodisc
- Producer: Dave McNair; Daniel Presley; Norman Kerner

Kelly Willis chronology
Kelly Willis (1993)	What I Deserve (1999)	Easy (2002)

What I Deserve is the fourth studio album by American singer-songwriter Kelly Willis. It was released in 1999 through Rykodisc, almost six years after her eponymous album. The recording sessions took place at the Hit Shack, Cedar Creek Studios and Congress House Studio in Austin. The album was produced by Dave McNair with Daniel Presley and Norman Kerner.

The album peaked at number 30 on the Top Country Albums and number 24 on the Heatseekers Albums in the United States and number 36 on the UK Independent Albums chart. It was supported with two promotional singles: "Take Me Down" and "Not Forgotten You".

== Critical reception ==
Professional ratings
Review scores
Source	Rating
AllMusic	3/5 stars
Entertainment Weekly	A
The Guardian	4/5 stars
Los Angeles Times	3/4 stars
PopMatters	6.9/10
Q	4/5 stars
Rolling Stone	3.5/5 stars
Spin	8/10
USA Today	3/4 stars
The Village Voice	B+

In Entertainment Weekly, Wook Kim opined that Willis "is far better served" on What I Deserve than on her previous "overproduced" major-label albums, "artfully melding the sturm und twang of her country upbringing with the plaintive grit of roots rock". Marc Weingarten of the Los Angeles Times said that Willis "reaffirms her status as one of alt-country's best and most versatile singers" with vocal performances that capture the "aching melancholy" of the material, while Brian Mansfield wrote in USA Today that "the torch in Willis' voice ... warms the existential country heartache" of her songs. The Guardian's Mark Bygraves highlighted the album's "stark beauty", particularly on "the emotional wasteland" of the title track and Willis's "moving" rendition of "Time Has Told Me". Writing for Spin, Charles Aaron noted "the soulfully self-aware sentiments" expressed on What I Deserve by Willis, finding that she had gotten "savvier" in her songwriting and cover song selections.

AllMusic critic Rick Anderson recommended What I Deserve "with reservations", praising Willis's vocals, the backing musicians, and McNair's "beautifully balanced and full-bodied" production, while finding the album lacking in memorable hooks. Robert Christgau stated in The Village Voice that Willis's persona on the album remained unchanged from her earlier work, but that she also "still sounds better the closer you listen" and especially "still has that enormous voice." In The Village Voice's year-end Pazz & Jop critics' poll, What I Deserve was voted the 27th-best album of 1999.

== Track listing ==
No.	Title	Writer(s)	Length
1.	"Take Me Down"	Kelly Willis; Gary Louris	3:46
2.	"What I Deserve"	Willis; Louris	4:20
3.	"Heaven Bound"	Damon Bramblett	3:20
4.	"Talk Like That"	Willis	3:09
5.	"Not Forgotten You"	Bruce Robison	3:36
6.	"Wrapped"	Robison	4:28
7.	"Cradle of Love"	Paul Kelly	4:57
8.	"Got a Feelin' for Ya"	Dan Penn; Chuck Prophet	3:25
9.	"Time Has Told Me"	Nick Drake	4:37
10.	"Fading Fast"	Willis; John Leventhal	2:54
11.	"Happy with That"	Willis; Louris	3:34
12.	"They're Blind"	Paul Westerberg	4:37
13.	"Not Long for This World"	Willis; Leventhal	3:28
Total length:			50:11

== Personnel ==
Track information and credits adapted from the album's liner notes:

- Kelly Willis – vocals
- Bruce Robison – harmony vocals (tracks: 2–5, 7)
- Amy Farris – harmony vocals (tracks: 2, 3, 6, 11), fiddle (tracks: 4, 9, 11), mandolin (track 5)
- Charlie Robison – harmony vocals (track 4)
- John Ludwick – harmony vocals (track 6), bass (tracks: 4–6, 8, 10)
- Chuck Prophet – harmony vocals (track 8), acoustic guitar (tracks: 1, 5, 8, 10, 12), electric guitar (tracks: 2, 4, 6, 7, 9)
- Mark Spencer – acoustic guitar (tracks: 2, 4, 6, 7, 9, 11, 13), electric guitar (tracks: 1, 5, 8, 10, 12)
- Jon Dee Graham – lap steel guitar (tracks: 3, 11, 13), electric guitar solo (track 5)
- Max Butler – electric guitar (tracks: 3, 7)
- Lloyd Maines – pedal steel guitar (track 9)
- Michael Ramos – Hammond B-3 organ (tracks: 5, 6, 12), Farfisa organ (track 8), piano (track 9)
- Michael Been – bass (tracks: 1–3, 7, 9, 11–13)
- Larry Aberman – drums (tracks: 1–3, 7, 9, 11–13)
- Rafael Gayol – drums (tracks: 4–6, 8, 10)
- Dave McNair – percussion (tracks: 1, 5, 6), bells (track 8), producer, recording, engineering, mixing, mastering
- Daniel Presley – producer & engineering (tracks: 1–3, 7, 9, 11–13)
- Norman Kerner – producer & engineering (tracks: 1–3, 7, 9, 11–13)
- Geoff Travis – executive producer
- Adam Larson – design
- Steven Jurgensmeyer – design
- Michael Gomez – photography

== Charts ==
Chart (1999)	Peak position
UK Independent Albums (OCC)	36
US Heatseekers Albums (Billboard)	24
US Top Country Albums (Billboard)	30
