= Kite (Kirsty MacColl album) =

Studio album by Kirsty MacColl
- Released: 8 May 1989
- Recorded: 1988
- Studio: The Town House, London; Ealing Studios, London; RAK Studios, London
- Genre: Alternative rock; pop rock; folk rock; country rock; blues rock
- Length: 39:19 (LP); 49:14 (CD)
- Label: Virgin
- Producer: Steve Lillywhite

Kirsty MacColl chronology
Kirsty MacColl (1981)	Kite (1989)	Electric Landlady (1991)

Singles from Kite
- 1. "Free World" Released: 20 March 1989; 2. "Days" Released: 19 June 1989; 3. "Innocence" Released: 18 September 1989; 4. "Don't Come the Cowboy with Me Sonny Jim!" Released: 12 March 1990

Kite is the second studio album by the British singer-songwriter Kirsty MacColl, released on 8 May 1989. Produced by her husband Steve Lillywhite, it was her first album for Virgin Records. The album includes MacColl's hit cover of the Kinks' "Days", as well as two tracks written with Smiths guitarist Johnny Marr. On 6 October 1989, it was certified silver by the BPI.

== Background ==
In a 1991 interview with Melody Maker, MacColl commented, "With Kite, I felt I had to prove that I wasn't this bimbo girl-next-door I'd been portrayed as. That had been hanging around my neck like a fucking albatross for so long, and I wanted to make the point that, yes, I can write a fucking song, pal!"

MacColl originally wanted to call the album Al Green Was My Valet, as a parody of the 1941 film title How Green Was My Valley, but Virgin Records were not keen on it. She then had the idea of the title Kite after David Gilmour, who played guitar on two tracks, declined payment for his contribution and suggested that a "kite" [slang for cheque] be sent to Armenia instead as a donation towards the relief of the 1988 Armenian earthquake. MacColl told Ira Robbins in 1990, "I thought that was such a nice image – a little bit of hope and optimism rising above a sea of crap."

In April 1990, MacColl revealed the album had sold approximately 85,000 copies in the UK.

== Critical reception ==
Professional ratings
Review scores
Source	Rating
AllMusic	4.5/5 stars
Entertainment Weekly	B+
Hi-Fi News & Record Review	A:1
New Musical Express	7/10
Record Mirror	4/5 stars
Rolling Stone	4/5 stars
The Rolling Stone Album Guide	3/5 stars
Sounds	3/5 stars

On its release, Dave Jennings of Melody Maker described the album as a "thoughtful, mature, yet sometimes exhilarating LP" and "cerebral but instantly likeable; never wild or abandoned, but always intriguing". Aside from some "tender moments", he considered most of Kite to show MacColl "on the attack", with her "carefully-layered, deadpan vocals" suiting the "anger" in her lyrics. Simon Williams of New Musical Express considered it "an old-fashioned album" with "proper songs [and] resolutely orthodox instruments". He concluded, "Kite is charming rather than classy. Everything is pleasantly down-to-earth, sweet and sour stories from a woman's point of view which always avoid being emotionally extreme." Peter Kane of Sounds noted it "boasts some fine tunes about life, love, and the whole damned thing" which is "done in a peculiarly colloquial, very English style" and with "not a hint of pretension". He described the album as "one to be proud of" and one which "deserves to be heard".

In a retrospective review, AllMusic called Kite "the pinnacle of [MacColl's] achievement" and her "best-sustained work". They felt that MacColl's songwriting was "excellent", with some of her "sharpest and cleverest words and most memorable melodies." Trouser Press wrote of the album: "This sturdy, provocative collection mixes full-bodied pop styles with some country, adding a film noir story sung in French, a pair of wonderful covers and pointed lyrical assaults on both Margaret Thatcher and shallow pop stars." The Rolling Stone Album Guide described the album as having a "skillfull, introspective elegance". In 2024, The Independent included it in their list of the 20 most underrated albums ever, ranking it number 9.

== Re-issues ==
Kite was re-released in 2005 with ten bonus tracks, including B-sides and alternate mixes. A 2012 expanded edition released by Salvo Records features a bonus disc with seventeen bonus tracks, also with B-sides and alternate mixes. Both re-issues were remastered. Demon Records re-issued the original twelve-track album in 2018 on 180g vinyl.

== Track listing ==
Adapted from the album's liner notes.

All tracks are written by Kirsty MacColl; except where indicated.

No.	Title	Writer(s)	Length
1.	"Innocence"	MacColl, Pete Glenister	4:09
2.	"Free World"		2:38
3.	"Mother's Ruin"	MacColl, Glenister	3:57
4.	"Days"	Ray Davies	3:00
5.	"No Victims"		3:50
6.	"Fifteen Minutes"		3:12
7.	"Don't Come the Cowboy with Me Sonny Jim!"		3:47
8.	"Tread Lightly"	MacColl, Glenister	3:20
9.	"What Do Pretty Girls Do?"	MacColl, Glenister	2:37
10.	"Dancing in Limbo"		2:51
11.	"The End of a Perfect Day"	MacColl, Johnny Marr	3:23
12.	"You and Me Baby"	MacColl, Marr	2:31
Total length:			39:19

CD edition bonus tracks
No.	Title	Writer(s)	Length
13.	"You Just Haven't Earned It Yet, Baby"	Morrissey, Marr	2:50
14.	"La Forêt de Mímosas"		3:36
15.	"Complainte Pour Ste Catherine"	Anna McGarrigle, Philippe Tatartchef	3:33
Total length:			49:14

2005 edition bonus tracks
No.	Title	Writer(s)	Origin	Length
13.	"You Just Haven't Earned It Yet, Baby" (She's Having a Baby soundtrack version)	Morrissey, Marr	She's Having a Baby soundtrack, 1988	3:40
14.	"Happy"		B-side to "Days"	2:33
15.	"Am I Right?"		B-side to "Don't Come the Cowboy with Me Sonny Jim!"	1:27
16.	"El Paso"	Marty Robbins	B-side to "Days"	3:46
17.	"La Forêt de Mímosas"		Kite CD; B-side to "Free World"	3:33
18.	"Complainte Pour Ste Catherine"	McGarrigle, Tatartchef	Kite CD; B-side to "Don't Come the Cowboy with Me Sonny Jim!"	3:33
19.	"Free World" (Radio Version)		CD single promo	2:38
20.	"Innocence" (Guilt Mix)	MacColl, Glenister	B-side to "Innocence"	5:56
21.	"No Victims" (Guitar Heroes Mix)		B-side to "Innocence"	4:25
22.	"The End of a Perfect Day" (Demo)	MacColl, Marr	B-side to "Free World"	3:10

=== 2012 edition bonus CD ===
The first disc contains the twelve tracks from the original album.

Disc two
No.	Title	Writer(s)	Origin	Length
1.	"Closer to God?"		B-side to "Free World"	3:55
2.	"The End of a Perfect Day" (Original demo version)	MacColl, Marr	B-side to "Free World"	3:12
3.	"You Just Haven't Earned It Yet, Baby"	Morrissey, Marr	Kite CD	2:49
4.	"La Forêt de Mímosas"		Kite CD; B-side to "Free World"	3:36
5.	"Happy"		B-side to "Days"	2:34
6.	"El Paso"	Robbins	B-side to "Days"	3:48
7.	"Still Life"	MacColl, Philip Rambow	B-side to "Days"	2:59
8.	"Please Help Me, I'm Falling"	Don Robertson, Hal Blair	B-side to "Days"	2:47
9.	"Innocence" (Single remix)	MacColl, Glenister	Single	4:02
10.	"Clubland"		B-side to "Innocence"	4:05
11.	"Don't Run Away from Me Now"	MacColl, Rambow	B-side to "Innocence"	2:58
12.	"Innocence" (Guilt Mix)	MacColl, Glenister	B-side to "Innocence"	5:55
13.	"No Victims" (Guitar Heroes Mix)		B-side to "Innocence"	4:23
14.	"Other People's Hearts"	MacColl, Gavin Povey	B-side to "Don't Come the Cowboy with Me Sonny Jim!"	3:37
15.	"Complainte Pour Ste Catherine"	McGarrigle, Tatartchef	Kite CD; B-side to "Don't Come the Cowboy with Me Sonny Jim!"	3:32
16.	"Am I Right?"		B-side to "Don't Come the Cowboy with Me Sonny Jim!"	1:26
17.	"You Just Haven't Earned It Yet, Baby" (She's Having a Baby soundtrack version)	Morrissey, Marr	She's Having a Baby soundtrack	3:47

== Personnel ==
Musicians

- Kirsty MacColl – vocals, acoustic guitar (10), electric guitar (10), bass (10), lap steel guitar (6, 7), autoharp (6), percussion (6, 10)
- Guy Barker – trumpet (6, 7, 15)
- Mark Berrow – violin (1, 12)
- Stuart Brooks – trumpet (7, 15)
- Paul Crowder – percussion (2, 9, 13–15)
- Ben Cruft – violin (1, 12)
- James Eller – bass (2, 3, 6, 7)
- Mel Gaynor – drums (1, 4, 5, 8, 9, 11, 13–15)
- Wilfred Gibson – violin (1, 7, 12)
- Roy Gillard – violin (1, 7, 12)
- David Gilmour – electric guitar (5), acoustic guitar (12)
- Pete Glenister – acoustic guitar (1–7, 9, 11), electric guitar (1–3, 7–9, 14, 15)
- Malcolm Griffiths – trombone (6, 7, 15)
- Jamie Lillywhite – vocals (1)
- Louis Lillywhite – vocals (1)
- Steve Lillywhite – double bass (6)
- Robbie McIntosh – acoustic guitar (2, 6, 7), electric guitar (3)
- Johnny Marr – electric guitar (3–5, 8, 9, 11–13), acoustic guitar (4, 9), harmonica (15)
- Yves N'Djock – electric guitar (1, 14, 15), backing vocals (15)
- Pino Palladino – bass (1, 5, 8, 11, 14, 15)
- David Palmer – drums (2, 3, 6, 7), percussion (7)
- Guy Pratt – bass (9, 13), double bass (4)
- Colin Stuart – acoustic guitar (1, 5, 6, 7, 8, 14, 15); electric guitar (6, 11)
- Jamie Talbot – tenor saxophone (6)
- Philip Todd – clarinet (6)
- Fiachra Trench – string and brass arrangements (1, 6, 7, 12, 15)
- Steve Turner – electric guitar (7), effects (7)
- Dave Woodcock – violin (1, 12)
- Gavyn Wright – violin (1, 7)

Technical

- Steve Lillywhite – producer
- Steve Chase – engineer
- Alan Douglas – engineer
- Chris Dickie – engineer
- Colin Stuart – engineer, mixing
- Noel Harris – assistant engineer
- Roy Spong – assistant engineer
- Mark Wallis – mixing
- Heidi Cannovo – assistant mixing engineer
- Bill Smith Studio – design
- Kirsty MacColl – design
- Andrew MacPherson – photography

Bonus tracks

- Kirsty MacColl – producer ("Happy", "El Paso", "Still Life", "Please Help Me, I'm Falling", "Clubland", "Don't Run Away from Me Now", "Am I Right?")
- Colin Stuart – producer ("Happy", "El Paso", "Still Life", "Please Help Me, I'm Falling", "Clubland", "Don't Run Away from Me Now", "Am I Right?")
- Johnny Marr – producer ("Happy", "El Paso")

Reissues

- Steve Rooke – remastering (2005)
- Chris Peyton – reissue design (2005)
- Charles Dickens – inner inlay photography (2005)
- Fine Splice Ltd. – remastering (2012)
- Estuary English – reissue design (2012)

== Recording information ==
- 1–9, 11, 13–15 recorded at The Town House
- 6, 10, 12 recorded at Ealing Studios.
- 1, 6, 7, 12, 15 recorded at RAK Studios
- David Gilmour recorded at Olympic Studios
- 1, 5, 10, 11, 13, 14 mixed at Ealing Studios.
- 2–4, 6–9, 12, 15 mixed at Olympic Studios.

== Charts ==
Chart (1989)	Peak position
Australian Albums (ARIA)	110
Swedish Albums Chart	48
UK Albums Chart	34

Chart (2021)	Peak position
UK Independent Albums	48
