= It Came from San Antonio =

It Came From San Antonio

Studio album by Bruce Robison
- Released: 2007
- Recorded: Austin, Texas
- Genre: Country
- Label: Premium

Bruce Robison chronology
Eleven Stories (2006)	It Came From San Antonio (2007)	The New World (2008)

It Came From San Antonio is the sixth album by American singer/songwriter Bruce Robison. It was released in 2007 on Premium Records.

== Critical reception ==
Professional ratings
Review scores
Source	Rating
AllMusic	3/5 stars

William Ruhlmann of AllMusic said It Came from San Antonio was moderate while David Cantwell of No Depression said the album's songs provided an instruction manual for up-and-coming songwriters.

== Track listing ==
All songs written by Bruce Robison, except where noted.

1. “It Came from San Antonio” – 2:56
2. “When It Rains” – 5:02
3. “Lifeline” – 3:29
4. “My Baby Now” – 3:25
5. “Anywhere But Here” (Robison, Monte Warden) – 5:19
6. “What Makes You Say” (Robison, Jack Ingram) – 3:51
7. “23A” – 3:40

== Releases ==
year	format	label	catalog #
2007	CD	Premium	1873
