= Beautiful Lie (album) =

Studio album by Bruce Robison and Kelly Willis
- Released: June 21, 2019
- Studio: The Bunker, Lockhart, Texas, US
- Genre: Country
- Length: 34:52
- Label: Motel
- Producer: Bruce Robison

Bruce Robison chronology
Bruce Robison & The Back Porch Band (2017)	Beautiful Lie (2019)	In the Woods (2024)

Kelly Willis chronology
Back Being Blue (2018)	Beautiful Lie (2019)

Beautiful Lie is a 2019 studio album by American country musicians Bruce Robison and Kelly Willis. The work was the fourth of four recordings released by the couple and received positive reviews from critics.

== Reception ==
Professional ratings
Review scores
Source	Rating
American Songwriter	3.5/5 stars
The Austin Chronicle	3.5/5 stars
PopMatters	8/10

For American Songwriter, Hal Horowitz called Beautiful Lie "a well-balanced set both vocally and musically", with "friskier tunes to offset the lost/fading love slower tracks". In The Austin Chronicle, Doug Freeman called the music "some of their best genre work together" and said that "Austin's reigning country couple remain on a roll and are only getting better". In No Depression, Matt Conner called this release "part textbook and part songbook" that "tips more than a hat to tradition while it adds plenty more to the catalog". Steve Horowitz of PopMatters stated, "Beautiful Lie successfully captures the sound of the past, but as Robison demonstrates on his self-penned tunes, the past is more than a memory. It is part of who one is in the here and now. We learn from our experiences. Life may not be perfect, but it’s all that we have and deserves to be treasured."

== Track listing ==
1. "If I Had a Rose" (Adam Wright) – 3:20
2. "Astrodome" (Jack Ingram and Bruce Robison) – 4:24
3. "Nobody's Perfect" (A. Wright) – 3:44
4. "One Dime at a Time" (Ed Bruce and Jerry Chestnutt) – 2:29
5. "Beautiful Lie" (David McDade and Russell Smith) – 3:30
6. "Can't Tell Nobody Nothin'" (A. Wright and Shannon Wright) – 3:22
7. "Coming Down" (Robison) – 2:40
8. "Lost My Best" (David Ball) – 3:12
9. "Brand New Me" (Robison) – 4:29
10. "Heartache to Houston" (Robison) – 3:42

== Personnel ==
- Bruce Robison – acoustic guitar on all tracks except "One Dime at a Time" and "Beautiful Lie", vocals, production
- Kelly Willis – vocals
- Joshua Blue – drums on all tracks except "Lost My Best" and "Heartache to Houston", percussion on "Astrodome" and "Heartache to Houston"
- Rich Brotherton – vocals on "Astrodome", "Nobody's Perfect", "One Dime at a Time", "Beautiful Lie", and "Coming Down"
- Scott Davis – banjo on "If I Had a Rose" and "Can't Tell Nobody Nothin'"; electric guitar on "Astrodome", "One Dime at Time", "Beautiful Lie", "Coming Down", "Lost My Best", "Brand New Me", and "Heartache to Houston"; piano on "Nobody's Perfect",
- Brad Jones – audio engineering on "Astrodome", "Nobody's Perfect", "Beautiful Lie", "Coming Down", and "Brand New Me"
- Chris King – artwork, layout, design
- Jim Langford – cover artwork
- Steve Mazur – audio engineering on "If I Had a Rose"
- David McNair – audio mastering at David McNair Mastering
- Trevor Nealon – piano on "If I Had a Rose", "Astrodome", "One Dime at a Time", "Beautiful Lie", "Coming Down", "Lost My Best", "Brand New Me", and "Heartache to Houston"; Hammond B3 on "If I Had a Rose", "Nobody's Perfect", "Beautiful Lie", "Coming Down", "Lost My Best", and "Brand New Me"; Wurlitzer piano on "Can't Tell Nobody Nothin'" and "Coming Down"
- Geoff Queen – slide guitar on "If I Had a Rose"; pedal steel guitar on "Astrodome", "Nobody's Perfect", "One Dime at a Time", "Beautiful Life", "Coming Down", "Lost My Best", and "Heartache to Houston"; mandolin on "Beautiful Life" and "Lost My Best"; electric guitar on "Can't Tell Nobody Nothin'" and "Brand New Me"
- Brian Sandifer – cello on "Heartache to Houston"
- John Michael Schoepf – bass guitar
- Jim Vollentine – audio engineering on all tracks except "If I Had a Rose"

== See also ==
- 2019 in American music
- 2019 in country music
- List of 2019 albums
