= Cheater's Game =

Studio album by Bruce Robison and Kelly Willis
- Released: February 12, 2013
- Studio: Nashville, Tennessee, US
- Genre: Country
- Length: 45:55
- Language: English
- Label: Premium Records/Thirty Tigers
- Producer: Brad Jones

Bruce Robison chronology
| His Greatest (2009) | Cheater's Game (2013) | Our Year (2014) |

Kelly Willis chronology
| Translated from Love (2007) | Cheater's Game (2013) | Our Year (2014) |

“I love his way with words, he doesn’t write real mysteriously, you know, there are some writers who, with the poetry of how they write, you’re not sure what they’re talking about. With Bruce it’s always a very clear story and yet he writes in a unique voice that has this deeper beauty to it, even though it is so simple.”

—Kelly Willis on husband Bruce Robison's songwriter.

Cheater's Game is a 2013 studio album by American country musicians Bruce Robison and Kelly Willis, released on Robison's Premium Records label. The work was the second of four recordings released by the couple and received positive reviews from critics and commercial success on several Billboard charts.

== Reception ==
According to the review aggregator Metacritic, Cheater's Game received "generally favorable reviews" based on a weighted average score of 80 out of 100 from four critic scores. Editors at AllMusic rated this album 3.5 out of 5 stars, with critic Thom Jurek writing that the musicians' "organic, relaxed, unforced approach is deceptively high in performance skill, yet resonates with an emotional depth that rings true throughout". Jim Caligiuri of The Austin Chronicle rated this album 3.5 out of 5 stars, writing that the singers "prove themselves greater together than apart on Cheater's Game". In No Depression, Jim Moulton praised the singing and song selection but criticized the mixing as being too loud. Steve Horowitz of PopMatters gave this release an 8 out of 10, stating that "the duo also have good taste in other people’s songs, which they make their own through their distinctive interpretations"; editors at the site named this the 10th best Americana album of the year. In The Washington Post, Jeff Wisser called Cheater's Game an album of "breezy harmonies, subtle shadings of acoustic sounds and Robison’s knowing story-songs blended with expertly chosen covers make for a winning country formula".

== Track listing ==
1. "Cheater's Game" (Liz Foster, Bruce Robison, and Savannah Welch) – 3:30
2. "Border Radio" (Dave Alvin) – 2:50
3. "We're All the Way" (Don Williams) – 3:48
4. "Long Way Home" (Hayes Carll) – 3:41
5. "9,999,999 Tears" (Razzy Bailey) – 3:55
6. "Leavin'" (Robison) – 2:51
7. "But I Do" (Jedd Hughes and Robison) – 3:29
8. "No Kinda Dancer" (Robert Earl Keen) – 3:24
9. "Lifeline" (Robison) – 4:17
10. "Ordinary Fool" (Robison) – 4:11
11. "Born to Roll" (Lawrence Shoberg) – 3:08
12. "Waterfall" (Robison) – 3:02
13. "Dreamin'" (Robison and Miles Zuniga) – 3:49

== Personnel ==
- Bruce Robison – acoustic guitar, vocals
- Kelly Willis – vocals, package concept
- Mike Crowley – package concept
- Fred Eltringham – drums on "Cheater's Game", "Border Radio", "We're All the Way", "Long Home Way", "9,999,999 Tears", "Lifeline", "Ordinary Fool", "Born to Roll", "Waterfall", and "Dreamin'"
- Pete Finney – banjo on "Cheater's Game", "Border Radio", "We're All the Way", "Long Home Way", "9,999,999 Tears", "Lifeline", "Ordinary Fool", "Born to Roll", "Waterfall", and "Dreamin'"; steel guitar on "Cheater's Game", "Border Radio", "We're All the Way", "Long Home Way", "9,999,999 Tears", "Lifeline", "Ordinary Fool", "Born to Roll", "Waterfall", and "Dreamin'"
- Mickey Grimm – percussion on "Leavin'", "But I Do", and "No Kinda Danger"
- Cody Hamilton – photography
- Dave Jacques – bass guitar on "Leavin'", "But I Do", and "No Kinda Danger"; tuba "Leavin'", "But I Do", and "No Kinda Danger"
- Brad Jones – acoustic guitar, bass guitar on "We're All the Way", keyboards on "Leavin'", piano on "Leavin'", looping on "Leavin'", mixing; production
- Fats Kaplan – fiddle on "Leavin'", "But I Do", and "No Kinda Danger"; accordion on "Leavin'", "But I Do", and "No Kinda Danger"
- Chris Kro – graphic design, illustrations
- Eamon McLaughlin – cello on "Cheater's Game", "Border Radio", "We're All the Way", "Long Home Way", "Lifeline", "Ordinary Fool", "Born to Roll", "Waterfall", and "Dreamin'"; fiddle on "Cheater's Game","Border Radio", "We're All the Way", "Long Home Way", "Lifeline", "Ordinary Fool", "Born to Roll", "Waterfall", and "Dreamin'"; mandolin on "Cheater's Game", "Border Radio", "We're All the Way", "Long Home Way", "Lifeline", "Ordinary Fool", "Born to Roll", "Ordinary Fool", "Born to Roll", "Waterfall", and "Dreamin'"
- Al Perkins – steel guitar on "Leavin'", "But I Do", and "No Kinda Danger"
- Lex Price – bass guitar on "Cheater's Game", "Long Home Way", "9,999,999 Tears", "Lifeline", "Ordinary Fool", "Born to Roll", "Waterfall", and "Dreamin'"
- Chris Scruggs – drums on "Leavin'", "But I Do", and "No Kinda Danger"
- Yes Master – audio mastering

== Chart performance ==
Cheater's Game placed on several Billboard charts: reaching 29 on the Top Country Albums, 3 on Top Heatseekers, and 31 on Independent Albums.

== See also ==
- 2013 in American music
- 2013 in country music
- List of 2013 albums
