= Amy Farris =

American fiddler, singer and songwriter

Amy Farris (October 20, 1968 – September 26, 2009) was an American fiddler and singer-songwriter. She toured or recorded with artists such as Dave Alvin, Exene Cervenka, Ray Price, Bruce Robison, Kelly Willis, and Brian Wilson. Her 2004 solo album Anyway was released on Yep Roc Records. The Los Angeles County Coroner's Department ruled her death a suicide.
