= Eleven Stories =

Studio album by Bruce Robison
- Released: 2006
- Recorded: Austin, Texas
- Genre: Country
- Label: Sustain

Bruce Robison chronology
Country Sunshine (2001)	Eleven Stories (2006)	It Came From San Antonio (2007)

Eleven Stories is the fifth album by American singer/songwriter Bruce Robison. It was released in 2006 on Sustain Records.

== Track listing ==
All songs (Robison) except where noted

1. “Every Once in a While” (Robison, Miles Zuniga) - 3:17
2. “Virginia” - 3:20
3. “Tennessee Jed” (Jerry Garcia, Robert Hunter) - 5:22
4. “More and More” (Webb Pierce) - 2:57
5. “Days Go By” (Robison, Miles Zuniga)- 3:56
6. “All Over but the Cryin'” - 4:39
7. “Don't Call It Love” - 3:36
8. “You Really Let Yourself Go” - 2:43
9. “I Never Fly” - 2:29
10. “Kitchen Blues” - 3:02
11. “Bandera Waltz” (Easy Adams) - 3:48

== Releases ==
year	format	label	catalog #
2006	CD	Sustain	10132

== Reception ==
Professional ratings
Review scores
Source	Rating
PopMatters	7/10 stars

Ronnie D. Lankford Jr. of AllMusic felt that Eleven Stories was for listeners looking for an album that had reflective tracks. Matt Cibula of PopMatters called the tracks "fresh and fun".
