= Our Year =

Studio album by Bruce Robison and Kelly Willis
- Released: May 27, 2014
- Studio: Alex the Great, Nashville, Tennessee, US
- Genre: Country
- Length: 31:27
- Language: English
- Label: Premium Records/Thirty Tigers
- Producer: Brad Jones

Bruce Robison chronology
Cheater's Game (2013)	Our Year (2014)	Bruce Robison & the Back Porch Band (2017)

Kelly Willis chronology
Cheater's Game (2013)	Our Year (2014)	Back Being Blue (2018)

“You know, I do think we feel more relaxed. We had done all this pre-production before Cheater's Game. Touring, trying the songs out on the road, trying to figure out what our sound was. And then putting that out there and not knowing how it was going to be received, was… Yeah, I think that because [the response to Cheater's Game] was all so positive, and it all worked so well, we could relax a bit. We had a lot of time between finishing that record and releasing and promoting it. We had a lot of time to think about [the next record]. And during that time songs kept popping up that we'd want to try out. We were eager to get back into the studio, and we worked with our touring band on this record. So, Our Year really was a natural extension of what we'd been doing. It was! It was very easy.”

—Kelly Willis on recording Our Year.

Our Year is a 2014 studio album by American country musicians Bruce Robison and Kelly Willis, released on Robison's Premium Records label. The work was the third of four recordings released by the couple and received positive reviews from critics and commercial success on two Billboard charts.

== Reception ==
Editors at AllMusic rated this album 4 out of 5 stars, with critic Thom Jurek writing "this collection of originals and covers goes right to the heart of what made [previous album] Cheater's Game special: the pairing of these voices in a decidedly Texas take on traditional country music" and exhorted readers "get this one". In American Songwriter, Jim Beviglia gave this album 3 out of 5 stars for the musicians "once again trading lead vocals and harmonizing behind tasteful Americana-type musical backing, finding nooks and crannies in the well-chosen songs that might otherwise have stayed hidden in solo readings" and continued that the finest parts of the music "are when the voices come together and it feels like they’re sharing the experiences in the songs". Doug Freeman of The Austin Chronicle rated this album 3.5 out of 5 stars, writing that this release finds the musicians "recapturing the magic" with "both playful [songs] and emotional, ripe ballads". Writing for Exclaim!, Stuart Henderson rated Our Year a 7 out of 10, stating that the emphasis on covers ends up "lending it a decidedly offhand feel", but also praising Robison's originals and opining that "the songs Willis and Robison have chosen to play here are all absorbing, and their close-harmony approach serves the material beautifully".

Two assessments were published in No Depression: Hyperbolium wrote that "their strengths as singers and songwriters peek through at every turn, but it’s the way their emotional conversation amplifies one another that sets this apart from their solo work" and Folk Villager opined that "they’re creating remarkable sounding albums bursting at the seams with impressive songs". Charles Pitter of PopMatters gave this release a 9 out of 10, summing up "with an album like this, Bruce and Kelly would have to suffer a strong dose of bad luck for this not to be their year, but if you’re proclaiming your own destiny, who needs stupid old luck anyway?. In USA Today, Brian Mansfield called Our Year "great songs, well sung and well played", where each instrument "gets a moment to shine, but it always supports the song, never obscuring the lyrics or the voices singing them".

== Track listing ==
1. "Departing Louisiana" (Robyn Ludwick) – 3:36
2. "Motor City Man" (Walter Hyatt) – 2:50
3. "Carousel" (Bruce Robison and Darden Smith) – 3:22
4. "Lonely for You" (Paul Kennerley and Kelly Willis) – 2:56
5. "A Hangin On" (Ira Allen and Buddy Mize) – 2:51
6. "Shake Yourself Loose" (T-Bone Burnett) – 3:31
7. "Harper Valley PTA" (Tom T. Hall) – 3:45
8. "Anywhere but Here" (Robison and Monte Warden) – 3:10
9. "I'll Go to My Grave Loving You" (Don Reid) – 3:03
10. "This Will Be Our Year" (Chris White) – 2:22

== Personnel ==
- Bruce Robison – acoustic guitar, vocals on all tracks except "Harper Valley PTA", harmonica on "Motor City Man" and "Anywhere But Here"
- Kelly Willis – vocals, package concept
- Fred Eltringham – percussion on "Departing Louisiana", "Motor City Man", "Carousel", "Lonely for You", "Shake Yourself Loose", "Harper Valley PTA", "Anywhere But Here", "I'll Go to My Grave Loving You", and "This Will Be Our Year"; drums on "Motor City Man", "Carousel", "Lonely for You", "Shake Yourself Loose", "Harper Valley PTA", "Anywhere But Here", "I'll Go to My Grave Loving You", and "This Will Be Our Year"
- Pete Finney – steel guitar on "A Hangin On", dobro on "Harper Valley PTA"
- Brad Jones – field harmonium on "Departing Louisiana", string arrangement on "A Hangin On", mixing, production
- John Ludwick – bass fiddle on "Carousel", "Lonely for You", "Shake Yourself Loose", "Anywhere But Here", and "I'll Go to My Grave Loving You"; acoustic baritone guitar on "Departing Louisiana"; bass guitar on "Motor City Man"
- Eamon Mclaughlin – fiddle on "Departing Louisiana", "Motor City Man", "Carousel", "Lonely for You", "Shake Yourself Loose", "Anywhere But Here", "I'll Go to My Grave Loving You", and "This Will Be Our Year"; mandolin on "Motor City Man", "Harper Valley PTA", and "I'll Go to My Grave Loving You"; percussion on "Departing Louisiana"; strings on "A Hangin On"
- Billy Perkins – design
- Lex Price – bass guitar on "A Hangin On", bass fiddle on "Harper Valley PTA"
- Geoff Queen – steel guitar on "Carousel", "Lonely for You", "Shake Yourself Loose", "Anywhere But Here", "I'll Go to My Grave Loving You", and "This Will Be Our Year"; dobro on "Departing Louisiana", and "Motor City Man"; acoustic guitar on "This Will Be Our Year"
- Chad Wadsworth – photography
- Yes Master – audio mastering

== Chart performance ==
Cheater's Game placed on several Billboard charts: reaching 40 on the Top Country Albums and 13 on Top Heatseekers.

== See also ==
- 2014 in American music
- 2014 in country music
- List of 2014 albums
