= Don't Come the Cowboy with Me Sonny Jim! =

Single by Kirsty MacColl

from the album Kite
- B-side: "Other People's Hearts"
- Released: 12 March 1990
- Genre: Country
- Length: 3:46
- Label: Virgin
- Songwriter(s): Kirsty MacColl
- Producer(s): Steve Lillywhite

Kirsty MacColl singles chronology
"Innocence" (1989)	"Don't Come the Cowboy with Me Sonny Jim!" (1990)	"Miss Otis Regrets/Just One of Those Things" (1990)

"Don't Come the Cowboy with Me Sonny Jim!" is a song by British singer and songwriter Kirsty MacColl, released on 12 March 1990 as the fourth and final single from her second studio album, Kite. It was written by MacColl and produced by Steve Lillywhite. The song reached No. 82 in the UK and remained in the charts for four weeks. A music video was filmed to promote the single, directed by Sarah Tuft.

== Critical reception ==
On its release, Gary Crossing of Record Mirror wrote that "Don't Come the Cowboy with Me Sonny Jim!" is "a delightful folksy lullaby with gorgeous harmonies, lilting country guitars and worldly wise lyrics". Mick Mercer of Melody Maker described it as "a cornball country and western tune" which "slightly disguis[es] MacColl's usual cunning lyrics in there, concerning the problems with men's attitudes to women and the balance between carnal lust and sex". He added, "The type of music ensures it won't reach as many people as it might - you only like this stuff if you're unfortunate enough to actually look like Hank Wangford, correct? - but it's horribly good. As per bleeding usual." Edwin Pouncey of New Musical Express considered the song to be "a full-throated and brazenly funny singalong" and "the best C&W you'll hear this side of Katy Moffatt".

In a review of Kite, Robin Denselow of The Guardian described the song as "country-style", "emotional" and "personal", with "straight talking matched against [MacColl's] own lap steel guitar work". Lynden Barber of The Sydney Morning Herald commented, "Though titles like 'Don't Come the Cowboy with Me Sonny Jim!' could spell twee-ness, there's a sharpness to the lyrics and spontaneity to the playing that obviates problems." Fred Goodman of Rolling Stone noted, "Tracks like 'Don't Come the Cowboy with Me Sonny Jim!' show that MacColl has something to say with those fine pipes." L. Kent Wolgamott of the Lincoln Journal Star felt MacColl sounded reminiscent of Skeeter Davis on the "countryish" song. Fred Shuster of the Los Angeles Daily News wrote, "Songs like 'Don't Come the Cowboy with Me Sonny Jim!' and 'Fifteen Minutes' are well-sung and tuneful". Tom Harrison of The Province described the song as "spritely" and a "worthy sequel" to MacColl's "There's a Guy Works Down the Chip Shop Swears He's Elvis".

== Track listing ==
7" single

1. "Don't Come the Cowboy with Me Sonny Jim!" - 3:46
2. "Other People's Hearts" - 3:39

12" single

1. "Don't Come the Cowboy with Me Sonny Jim!" - 3:46
2. "Complainte Pour Ste Catherine" - 3:31
3. "Other People's Hearts" - 3:39

CD single

1. "Don't Come the Cowboy with Me Sonny Jim!" - 3:46
2. "Other People's Hearts" - 3:39
3. "Complainte Pour Ste Catherine" - 3:31
4. "Am I Right" - 1:27

== Personnel ==
- Kirsty MacColl - lead vocals, steel guitar
- Johnny Marr, Steve Turner - electric guitar
- Pete Glenister - electric guitar, acoustic guitar
- Robbie McIntosh - acoustic guitar
- Gavyn Wright, Roy Gillard, Wilfred Gibson - violins
- Fiachra Trench - string arrangement
- Malcolm Griffiths - trombone
- Guy Barker, Stuart Brooks - trumpet
- James Eller - double bass
- David Palmer - drums, percussion

Production

- Steve Lillywhite - producer of "Don't Come the Cowboy with Me Sonny Jim!" and "Complainte Pour Ste Catherine"
- Kirsty MacColl, Colin Stuart - producers of "Other People's Hearts" and "Am I Right"
- Alan Douglas, Chris Dickie - engineers
- Mark Wallis - mixing

Other

- Bill Smith Studio - sleeve design

== Charts ==
Chart (1990)	Peak position
UK Singles Chart	82

== Cover versions ==
- In 2002, American singer Kelly Willis included a version of the song on her fifth studio album Easy. She told Billboard that year: "That's one of my favorite cuts. I love [MacColl's] music, and I wore that song out. I had to think twice about doing this because of her death. I really wanted to do it justice."
