= Stephen Yerkey =

American singer-songwriter

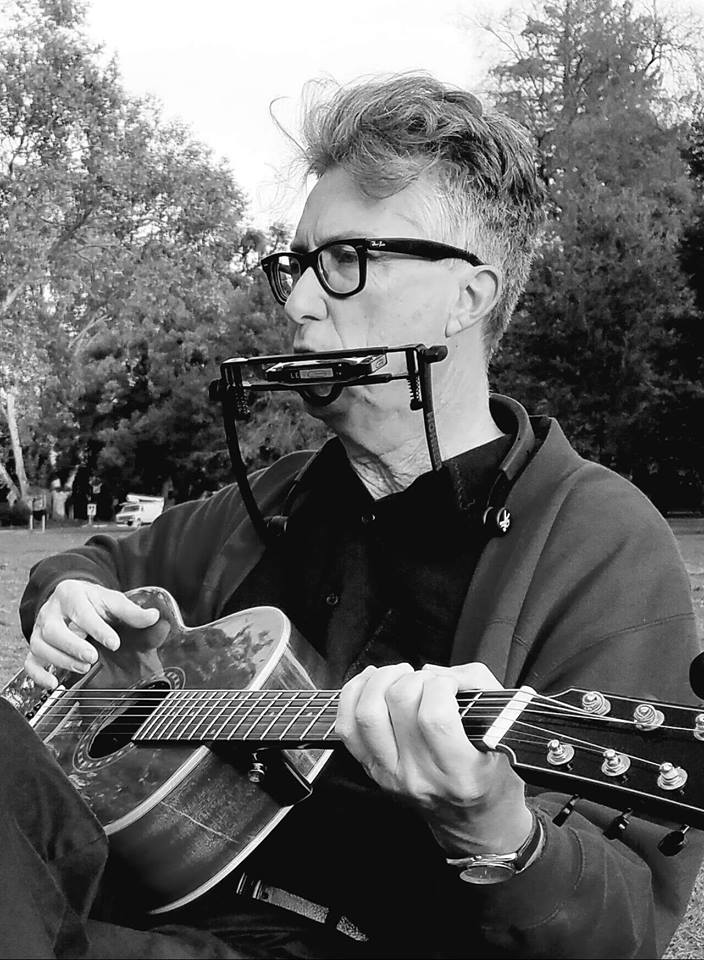
- Yerkey in 2016

Background information
- Born: Stephen McKay Yerkey; December 15, 1950 (age 75); West Virginia, U.S.
- Origin: San Francisco, CA, U.S.
- Genre: Americana music
- Occupation: Musician
- Instrument: Guitar
- Website: stephenyerkey.com

Stephen McKay Yerkey (born December 15, 1950) is a singer-songwriter and performer of soulful Americana and rock currently living in northern California, playing solo and with his band, Two Car Funeral, around San Francisco and Sacramento; he developed a following while based in the Bay Area during the early part of his career.

== Early life ==
Yerkey was born in Welch, West Virginia and grew up in, among other places, St. Louis, Missouri, Covington, Kentucky, and Detroit, Michigan. He began playing guitar at the age of 14, at which time he discovered Bob Dylan and the Rolling Stones, and started developing his own unique style.

== Career ==
Yerkey was the frontman of the band Nonfiction, 1977-1987, and again during their reunion, 2016-2018. Nonfiction released one eponymous album on Demon Records. In 1990, he contributed the song "The Final Word" to Acoustic Music Project, an AIDS benefit album on Alias Records. His solo debut album, Confidence, Man, was released in 1995 on Heyday Records and was produced by, among others, Pere Ubu's Eric Drew Feldman. Yerkey's recording of the Ted Hawkins song "Stay Close to Me" from Confidence, Man was featured in the soundtrack of the 1997 movie "Lewis & Clark & George." His next album, Up From Mo's, was independently released in 2003. His most recent album, Metaneonatureboy was released in 2006 on Echo Records and, like Confidence Man, was produced by Eric Drew Feldman. Metaneonatureboy included the song "Translated from Love", which Kelly Willis later covered on her album of the same name. In 2016, with Yerkey again at the helm, Nonfiction reunited for a single performance at the Hotel Utah in San Francisco.

== Reception ==
Confidence, Man has been described as "...a lost classic waiting to be rediscovered by fans of Richard Buckner and Townes Van Zandt." Other critics have praised the album's tracks "Cocksucking Blonde" and "Maker's Mark," and have written that its music depicts the gritty aspect of life in San Francisco. Yerkey has also been called the "Elvis Costello of country." A review in the San Francisco Chronicle described his music as "barroom laments, howled prayers and fiery indictments that burned with the intensity of a real person with real soul."

Up From Mo's is described on at least one website as "Solo voice, acoustic guitar and harmonica, fusing country, jazz, folk and blues, rich storytelling and the eccentric West-Virginia-born baritone singing tales of railroad workers, robber barons, short pants, love, despair, Algiers and lighthouse keeping."

== Discography ==
=== Solo ===
- Confidence Man (Heyday, 1994)
- Up From Mo's (Self-released, 2003)
- Metaneonatureboy (Echo, 2006)

=== With Nonfiction ===
- Nonfiction (Demon, 1986)
