= Kelly Willis (album) =

Studio album by Kelly Willis
- Released: 1993
- Genre: Country
- Label: MCA
- Producer: Don Was, Tony Brown, John Leventhal

Kelly Willis chronology
| Bang Bang (1991) | Kelly Willis (1993) | What I Deserve (1998) |

Professional ratings
Review scores
| Source | Rating |
|---|---|
| AllMusic | 4.5/5 stars |

Kelly Willis is the third album from the Austin, Texas-based singer. There were a couple of minor Billboard hits in the No. 63 "Heaven's Just a Sin Away" (covering a 1977 No. 1 hit for the Kendalls) and the No. 72 "Whatever Way the Wind Blows." Also of note is a duet with Kevin Welch, "That'll Be Me."

Tony Brown produced the album, with co-production by Don Was and John Leventhal on the tracks "Get Real" and "Shadows of Love".

== Track listing ==
1. "Take It All Out on You" (Bruce Robison, Mas Palermo) – 2:33
2. "Heaven's Just a Sin Away" (Jerry Gillespie) – 2:30
3. "One More Night" (Palermo, Charlie Robison) – 3:17
4. "That'll Be Me" [with Kevin Welch] (Kevin Welch) – 4:23
5. "Whatever Way the Wind Blows" (Marshall Crenshaw) – 3:23
6. "Get Real" (Kelly Willis, John Leventhal) – 2:56
7. "I Know Better Now" (Jim Lauderdale) – 3:48
8. "Up All Night" (Libby Dwyer) – 4:06
9. "World Without You" (Willis, Paul Kennerley) – 3:17
10. "Shadows of Love" (Willis, Leventhal) – 4:02

== Personnel ==
- Richard Bennett – acoustic guitar
- Billy Bremner – electric guitar
- Dan Dugmore – steel guitar
- Andrew Gold – background vocals
- Mike Henderson – electric guitar, mandolin
- Jellyfish (band) – background vocals
- Kieran Kane – bouzouki, mandolin, background vocals
- Fats Kaplin – accordion, fiddle, flute
- John Leventhal – acoustic guitar, electric guitar, organ, percussion, piano
- Roger Joseph Manning Jr. – background vocals
- Jonell Mosser – background vocals
- Michael Rhodes – bass guitar
- Harry Stinson – drums, background vocals
- Andy Sturmer – background vocals
- Benmont Tench – keyboards
- Don Was – bass guitar
- Kevin Welch – acoustic guitar and duet vocals on "That'll Be Me"
- Kelly Willis – lead vocals, background vocals
- Glenn Worf – bass guitar
