= Well Travelled Love =

Studio album by Kelly Willis
- Released: 1990
- Genre: Country
- Label: MCA
- Producer: Tony Brown, John Guess

Kelly Willis chronology
Well Travelled Love (1990)	Bang Bang (1991)

Professional ratings
Review scores
Source	Rating
AllMusic	3/5 stars
Robert Christgau	(2-star Honorable Mention)

Well Travelled Love is the debut album by American singer Kelly Willis. It was released in 1990 via MCA Records and produced by Tony Brown. "I Don't Want to Love You", "River of Love", and "Looking for Someone Like You" were released as singles. Although none of these charted in the United States, "Looking for Someone Like You" reached No. 85 on the RPM country singles charts in Canada. Also included on this album is the song "Drive South". Originally recorded by John Hiatt, it was a No. 63 single for the Forester Sisters and the Bellamy Brothers, and a No. 2 country hit for Suzy Bogguss in 1992.

== Track listing ==
1. "My Heart's in Trouble Tonight" (Mas Palermo) – 2:51
2. "Hole in My Heart" (Steve Earle, Richard J. Dobson) – 2:47
3. "I Don't Want to Love You (But I Do)" (Paul Kennerley) – 3:21
4. "Looking for Someone Like You" (Kennerley, Kevin Welch) – 3:09
5. "Don't Be Afraid" (Monte Warden) – 3:40
6. "River of Love" (Palermo) – 2:50
7. "I'm Just Lonely" (Palermo, Kelly Willis) – 2:25
8. "One More Time" (Warden, Emory Gordy, Jr.) – 2:48
9. "Drive South" (John Hiatt) – 3:30
10. "Well Travelled Love" (Palermo) – 3:46
11. "Red Sunset" (Palermo) – 3:06

== Charts ==
Chart (1990)	Peak position
US Top Country Albums (Billboard)	64
