= Bang Bang (Kelly Willis album) =

Studio album by Kelly Willis
- Released: 1991
- Recorded: 1990
- Studio: Emerald, Masterfonics Studio 6, and Soundstage
- Genre: Country
- Label: MCA
- Producer: Tony Brown

Kelly Willis chronology
Well Travelled Love (1990)	Bang Bang (1991)	Kelly Willis (1993)

Professional ratings
Review scores
Source	Rating
AllMusic	4.5/5 stars
Chicago Tribune	3.5/4 stars
Christgau's Consumer Guide	B+
Entertainment Weekly	B+

Bang Bang is an album by country music artist Kelly Willis, released in 1991 on MCA Records. It received little attention from country radio, although it was the biggest-selling of her three MCA albums. It includes the Billboard minor country hit "Baby Take a Piece of My Heart", which rose to No. 51 on the charts.

== Track listing ==
1. "I'll Try Again" (Jim Lauderdale, Monte Warden) – 2:55
2. "Too Much to Ask" (Mas Palermo) – 3:10
3. "The Heart That Love Forgot" (Kostas, Palermo) – 3:07
4. "Sincerely (Too Late to Turn Back Now)" (Steve Earle, Robert Earl Keen) – 4:39
5. "Baby Take a Piece of My Heart" (Kostas, Kelly Willis) – 3:44
6. "Bang Bang" (Clavelle Isnard) – 3:16
7. "Hidden Things" (Paul Kelly) – 4:08
8. "Not Afraid of the Dark" (Lauderdale) – 4:36
9. "Standing by the River" (Tom Clifford) – 3:09
10. "Settle for Love" (Joe Ely) – 3:40

== Personnel ==
- Kelly Willis: Lead Vocals
- Richard Bennett, Bernie Leadon: Acoustic Guitar
- Bernie Leadon, Steuart Smith: Electric guitar
- Steuart Smith: Slide Guitar
- Paul Franklin: Steel Guitar
- John Barlow Jarvis: Keyboards
- Leland Sklar, Michael Rhodes, Brad Fordham: Bass guitar
- Larrie Londin, Mas Palermo: Drums, Percussion
- Harry Stinson, Billy Thomas, Anthony Crawford, Kelly Willis: Background Vocals
