= Kelly Willis =

American country music singer-songwriter

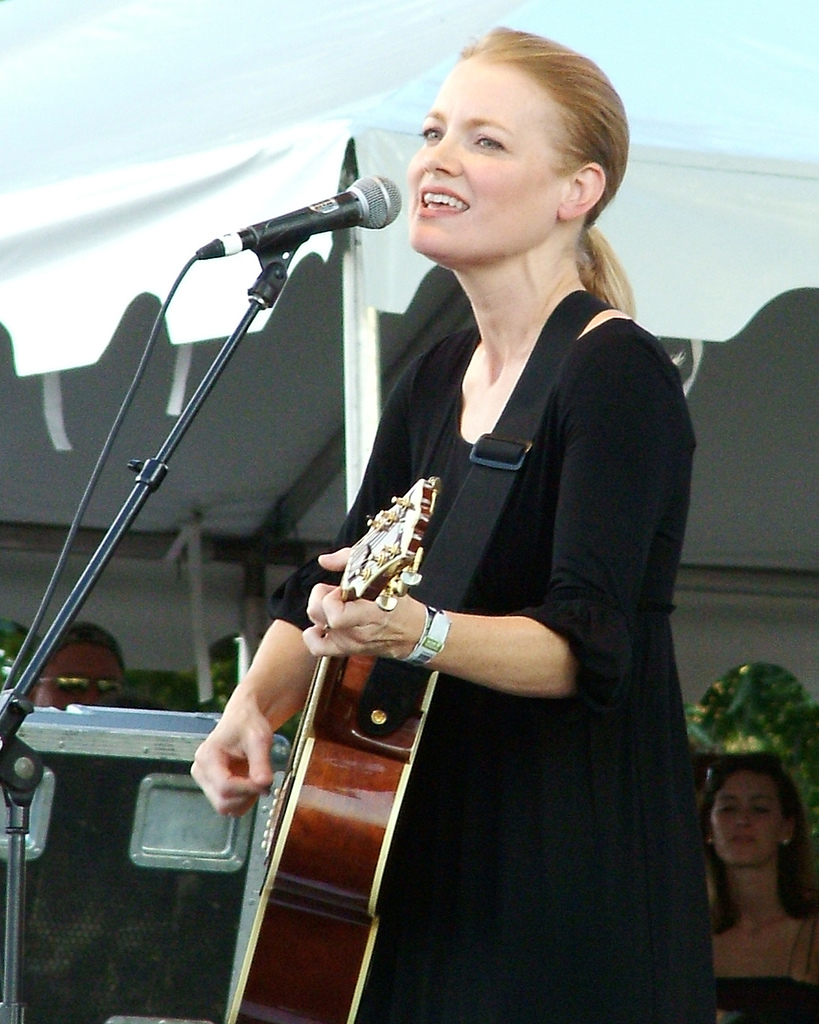
- Kelly Willis at the Austin City Limits Music Festival, September 2007.

Background information
- Born: October 2, 1968 (age 58)
- Origin: Annandale, Virginia, United States
- Genres: Honky tonk, country, Americana, alt country
- Occupation: Singer-songwriter
- Years active: 1990–present
- Labels: MCA; A&M; Rykodisc; Premium Records
- Spouse: Mas Palermo (m. 1989; div. 1991) Bruce Robison (m. 1996; div. 2022)
- Website: kellywillis.com

Kelly Diane Willis (born October 2, 1968) is an American country music singer-songwriter. Her music has been described as being new traditionalist and alternative country.

== Early life ==
Born in Lawton, Oklahoma, Willis was the youngest of three children. Her father was a U.S. Army colonel. Her mother had a strong interest in music in addition to singing and acting in amateur musicals. Willis began singing when she was nine, around when her parents divorced. After the divorce, Willis and her siblings lived with her father and moved to Kansas, North Carolina, and then northern Virginia for her father's military career. Her father worked at the Pentagon while she was in high school. She went to middle school in North Carolina and attended a high school in Annandale, Virginia.

== Career ==
During a high school visit to the beach, Willis entered a pay recording booth and sang a version of Elvis Presley's "Teddy Bear." Willis showed this demo to her boyfriend, drummer Mas Palermo, and joined his rockabilly band, the Vibrato Brothers, at 16. The band took her on as the lead vocalist and soon renamed themselves Kelly Willis & the Fireballs. After Willis's high school graduation, the band decided to move to Austin, but then broke up after a few months in Austin. Willis and Palermo, who had gotten married in 1989, formed a new band called Radio Ranch. In Austin, Willis attracted the notice of several influential Texas singer-songwriters including Nanci Griffith and Lyle Lovett. Griffith introduced MCA producer Tony Brown to Willis. Brown was impressed with Willis' vocal abilities and signed her to MCA in 1989.

MCA embarked on a big marketing campaign for Willis after she recorded her first album on the label, Well Travelled Love. She was interviewed by several national magazines including more unusual publications like Vogue and Mademoiselle. She sang on the soundtrack of the 1991 film Thelma and Louise. She also had a small part in Tim Robbins’ 1992 film Bob Roberts. Willis appeared in Dwight Yoakam's video for "A Thousand Miles from Nowhere" and as a member of Vince Gill's pickup band in his "Don't Let Our Love Start Slippin' Away" video. She was nominated for Top New Female Vocalist of the year at the 1993 ACM Awards. Despite publicity and positive reviews from most reviewers, Well Travelled Love and Willis' later albums for MCA (Bang Bang in 1991 and Kelly Willis in 1993) sold modestly and received very little radio play. In 1994, MCA released Willis from her contract. In 1995, Willis collaborated with Jay Farrar on the song "Rex's Blues", which appeared on the AIDS benefit album Red Hot + Bothered produced by the Red Hot Organization.

In 1996, Willis recorded an EP for A&M Records entitled Fading Fast. Willis then decided to record her next album on her own, resulting in the 1999 album What I Deserve, which Willis sold to Rykodisc after finishing it. What I Deserve was commonly seen in the press as Willis's response to her history with MCA and was praised by critics, becoming a hit for Willis. She was also a judge for the 2nd annual Independent Music Awards. In 2002, Willis released Easy.

In 2003, Willis and her husband Bruce Robison released the record Happy Holidays, a cover album of Christmas songs. Beginning in 2005, Willis and Robison appeared in television and radio commercials for the anti-allergy product Claritin. In the fall of 2007, Willis released Translated From Love. It was recorded at Robison's studio, Premium Recording Services, in Austin and produced by Chuck Prophet. The album was co-written by Willis, Prophet, and Jules Shear. It includes a cover version of Iggy Pop's "Success".

In early 2008, Willis announced that she would take an indefinite hiatus from live performances due to family obligations. Her later 2008 scheduled tour dates continued as planned until the final show on May 2, 2008.

Willis began to tour outside of Texas again in 2010. She headlined the Northern Rockies Folk Festival in Hailey, Idaho on August 7, 2010. Then she performed at the Hardly Strictly Bluegrass Festival at Speedway Meadow in Golden Gate Park in San Francisco on October 2, 2010. In 2011, she toured the United States with Bruce Robison, performing new songs in preparation for an album with Robison. The album, Cheater's Game, was released on February 12, 2013. Willis and Robison began a tour supporting the release on February 13, 2013 in New York City. The couple followed up their first album together 14 months later, releasing Our Year.

In 2018, Willis released Back Being Blue, her first solo album in more than a decade. The album was produced by Robison. A year later a third collaborative album with Robison, Beautiful Lie, came out.

== Personal life ==
Willis married her high school boyfriend Mas Palermo in 1989; they divorced in 1991. In 1992, Willis met Austin singer-songwriter Bruce Robison. After dating for several years, Willis and Robison married in 1996.

Willis went through in vitro fertilization treatments and gave birth to her son Deral Otis in January 2001. Her experience with raising a child led to a different sort of album than the earlier What I Deserve. In 2002, Willis became pregnant again and gave birth to twins Abigail Esme and Benjamin James on March 24, 2003. On January 10, 2006, Willis had her fourth child, Joseph Willis Robison.

On January 21, 2022, Willis and Robison announced their upcoming divorce via their Facebook pages.

== Discography ==
=== Albums ===
Title	Album details	Peak chart positions		
Title	Album details	US Country	US Heat	US Indie
Well Travelled Love	Release date: May 25, 1990; Label: MCA Records	64	—	—
Bang Bang	Release date: April 16, 1991; Label: MCA Records	—	—	—
Kelly Willis	Release date: July 6, 1993; Label: MCA Records	—	—	—
Fading Fast (EP)	Release date: 1996; Label: A&M Records	—	—	—
What I Deserve	Release date: February 23, 1999; Label: Rykodisc	30	24	—
One More Time: The MCA Recordings	Release date: September 12, 2000; Label: MCA Nashville	—	—	—
Easy	Release date: August 20, 2002; Label: Rykodisc	29	17	19
Happy Holidays	Release date: 2003; Label: Rykodisc	—	—	—
Translated from Love	Release date: June 26, 2007; Label: Rykodisc	46	12	37
Cheater's Game (with Bruce Robison)	Release date: February 12, 2013; Label: Spunk Records	29	3	31
Our Year (with Bruce Robison)	Release date: May 27, 2014; Label: Premium Records	40	13	—
Back Being Blue	Release date: May 19, 2018; Label: Premium Records/Thirty Tigers	—	7	30
Beautiful Lie (with Bruce Robison)	Release date: July 11, 2019; Label: Next Waltz			
"—" denotes releases that did not chart

=== Singles ===
Year	Single	Peak chart positions			Album
Year	Single	US Country	CAN Country	CAN AC	Album
1990	"I Don't Want to Love You (But I Do)"	—^{A}	—	—	Well Travelled Love
1990	"River of Love"	—^{B}	—	—	Well Travelled Love
1990	"Looking for Someone Like You"	—	85	—	Well Travelled Love
1991	"Baby Take a Piece of My Heart"	51	65	—	Bang Bang
1991	"The Heart That Love Forgot"	—	—	—	Bang Bang
1991	"Settle for Love"	—	—	—	Bang Bang
1993	"Whatever Way the Wind Blows"	72	73	—	Kelly Willis
1993	"Heaven's Just a Sin Away"	63	81	—	Kelly Willis
1996	"Fading Fast"	—	—	—	Fading Fast
1998	"Take Me Down"	—	—	—	What I Deserve
1999	"Not Forgotten You"	—	—	80	What I Deserve
2002	"If I Left You"	—	—	—	Easy
2003	"Don't Come the Cowboy with Me Sonny Jim!"	—	—	—	Easy
2007	"Teddy Boys"	—	—	—	Translated from Love
2007	"The More That I'm Around You"	—	—	—	Translated from Love
"—" denotes releases that did not chart

Notes:

- ^{A} "I Don't Want to Love You (But I Do)" did not chart on Hot Country Songs, but peaked at No. 3 on Hot Country Radio Breakouts.
- ^{B} "River of Love" did not chart on Hot Country Songs, but reached No. 10 on Hot Country Radio Breakouts.

=== Music videos ===
Year	Video	Director
1990	"I Don't Want to Love You (But I Do)"	
1990	"River of Love"	Coke Sams
1991	"Baby Take a Piece of My Heart"	Mark Lindquist
1991	"The Heart That Love Forgot"	Mark Lindquist
1993	"Whatever Way the Wind Blows"	Jim Glander
1993	"Heaven's Just a Sin Away"	Wayne Miller
1999	"Not Forgotten You"	Roger Pistole
2002	"If I Left You"	Steven Goldmann
2003	"Don't Come the Cowboy With Me, Sonny Jim!"	Trey Fanjoy/Traci Goudie
2007	"Teddy Boys"	
2014	"Harper Valley PTA" (with Bruce Robison)	Bruce Robison/Glenn Seale
2014	"Motor City Man" (with Bruce Robison)	Bruce Robison/Glenn Seale

=== Appears on ===
- 1991: Various Artists – "Thelma & Louise" (Original Motion Picture Soundtrack), vocals on track 6, "Little Honey"
- 1994: Monte Warden – "Monte Warden" (Watermelon Records), vocals on track 5, "The Only One"
- 1995: Aaron Neville – The Tattooed Heart (A&M Records), vocals on track 11, "For the Good Times"
- 1998: Various Artists – Real: The Tom T. Hall Project (Sire Records) -- Track 2, "That's How I Got to Memphis"
- 2000: Robbie Fulks: "The Very Best of Robbie Fulks" (Bloodshot Records) -- duet vocals on track 7, "Parallel Bars". (Note: the record is not a "best of", despite the title, but a cheekily named collection of tracks.)
- 2005: Various Artists – "A Tribute to Billy Joe Shaver (Live)" (Compadre), vocals on track 3, "Ride Me Down Easy"
- 2012: Martin Zellar – "Roosters Crow" (Label: Owen Lee Recordings), vocals on track 1, "Took the Poison" and track 3, "Running on Pure Fear"
- 2012: Mark Collie & His Reckless Companions – "Alive at Brushy Mountain State Penitentiary" (Ranch Records), vocals on tracks 4, 5, 9
