= Bruce Robison =

American singer-songwriter

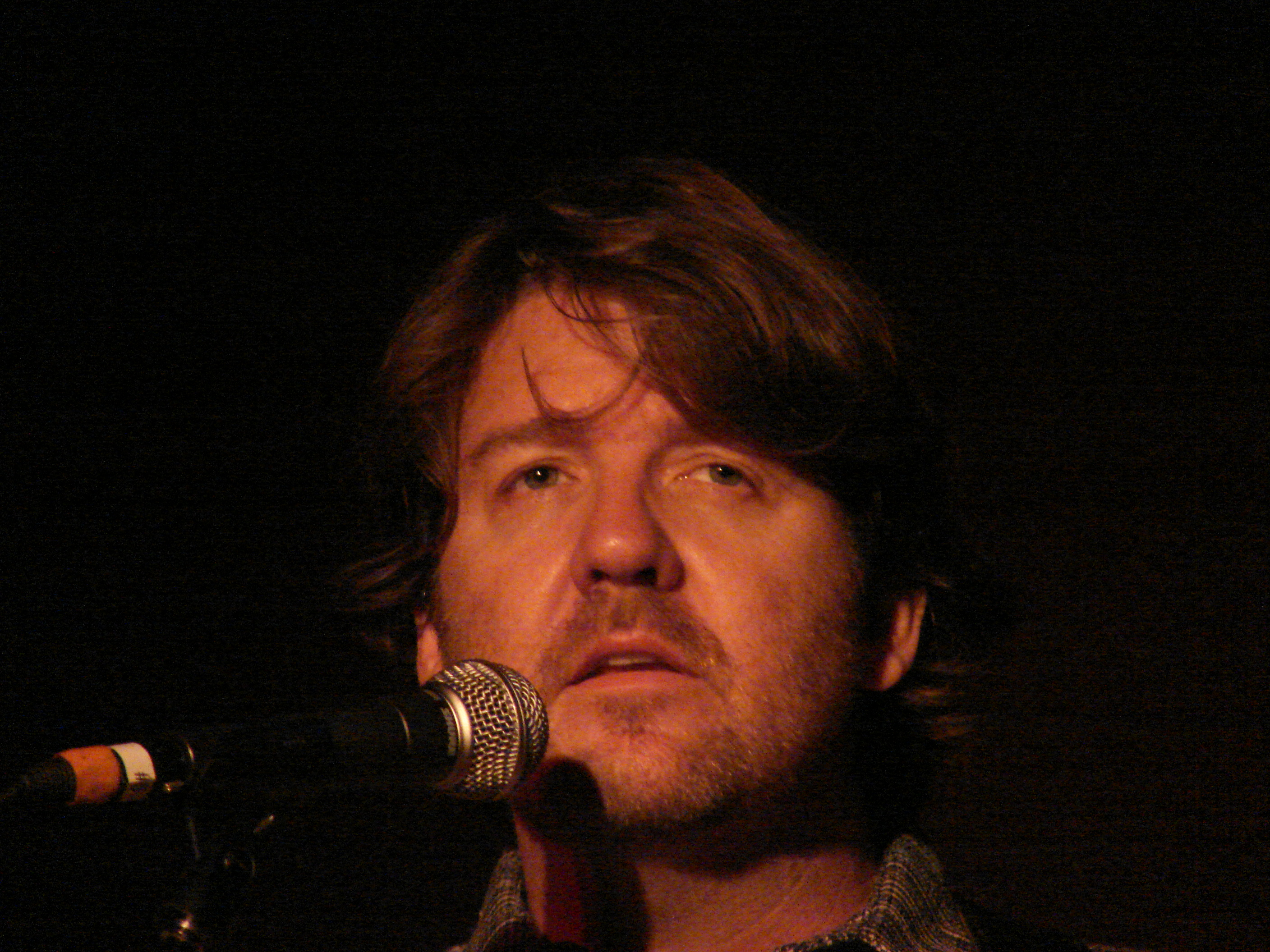
- Robison in 2009

Background information
- Born: Bruce Ben Robison; June 11, 1966 (age 60)
- Origin: Bandera, Texas
- Genres: Folk, country
- Instruments: Vocals, guitar, harmonica
- Labels: Vireo, Lucky Dog, Premium
- Spouse: Kelly Willis (m. 1996; div. 2022)
- Website: brucerobison.com

Bruce Ben Robison (born June 11, 1966) is an American Texas country music singer-songwriter. Bruce and his brother, fellow singer-songwriter Charlie Robison, grew up in Bandera, Texas, near San Antonio. His self-titled debut album was released in 1995.

Robison has written several songs which have become hits when covered by well-known singers, including: "Travelin' Soldier," (recorded in 2003 by the Dixie Chicks, reached No. 1 on the Country charts); "Angry All the Time," (recorded by Tim McGraw and Faith Hill in 2001, also reached No. 1 on the country charts); and "Wrapped" (recorded in 2006 by George Strait, reached No. 2 in 2007). Bruce runs The Next Waltz, a record label by artists for artists.

== Personal life ==
Sister, Robyn Ludwick, and late brother Charlie Robison are accomplished singer-songwriters in their own right.

In 1992, he met singer-songwriter Kelly Willis and they married in 1996. Together they had a son, Deral Otis, in January 2001. Willis became pregnant again and gave birth to twins Abigail Esme and Benjamin James on March 24, 2003. On January 10, 2006, Kelly welcomed fourth child Joseph Willis Robison.

On January 21, 2022 Kelly and Bruce announced their upcoming divorce via their Facebook pages.

== Discography ==
=== Albums ===
Title	Album details	Peak chart positions		
Title	Album details	US Country	US Heat	US Indie
Bruce Robison	Release date: July 16, 1996; Label: Vireo Records	—	—	—
Wrapped	Release date: May 19, 1998; Label: Lucky Dog Records	—	—	—
Long Way Home from Anywhere	Release date: July 13, 1999; Label: Lucky Dog Records	—	—	—
Country Sunshine	Release date: September 11, 2001; Label: Boar's Nest Records	—	—	—
Eleven Stories	Release date: April 4, 2006; Label: Sustain Records	—	—	—
Happy Holidays (with Kelly Willis)	Release date: August 29, 2006; Label: Rykodisc	—	—	—
It Came from San Antonio	Release date: May 15, 2007; Label: Premium Records	—	—	—
The New World	Release date: September 2, 2008; Label: Premium Records	—	—	—
His Greatest	Release date: January 20, 2009; Label: Premium Records	—	—	—
Cheater's Game (with Kelly Willis)	Release date: February 12, 2013; Label: Premium Records	29	3	31
Our Year (with Kelly Willis)	Release date: May 27, 2014; Label: Premium Records	40	13	—
Bruce Robison & the Back Porch Band	Release date: April 28, 2017; Label: Motel Time Music	—	—	—
Beautiful Lie (with Kelly Willis)	Release date: June 21, 2019; Label: Motel Time Music	—	—	—
Into the Woods	Release date: February 9, 2024; Label: The Next Waltz	—	—	—
"—" denotes releases that did not chart

=== Music videos ===
Year	Video	Director
1998	"Angry All the Time"	David McClister
1999	"Desperately"	David McClister
1999	"The Good Life"	David McClister
2006	"Virginia"	David McClister
2014	"Harper Valley PTA" (with Kelly Willis)	Bruce Robison/Glenn Seale

=== Other contributions ===
- 107.1 KGSR Radio Austin - Broadcasts Vol.10 (2002) – "What Would Willie Do"
- Eklektikos Live (2005) – "Travelin' Soldier"

== Selected repertoire as songwriter ==
Year	Title
1996	Travelin' Soldier
1998	Angry All the Time
1998	Wrapped
1998	Desperately
