= Alison Moyet discography =

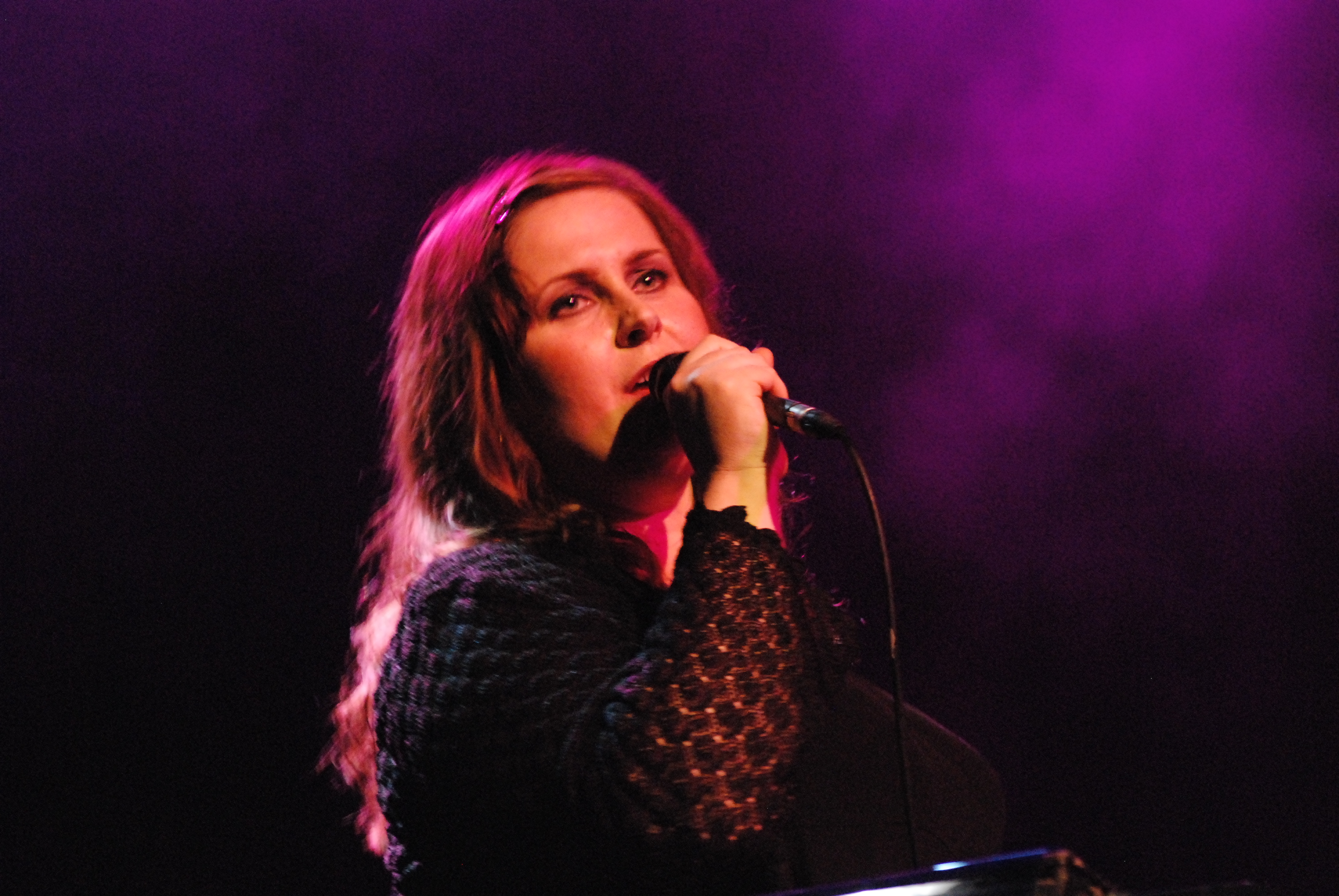
- Alison Moyet, performing in Dublin, 2008
- Studio albums: 10
- Compilation albums: 3
- Live releases: 2
- Singles: 32

The discography of Alison Moyet, an English pop singer-songwriter, consists of ten studio albums, three compilation albums, two live releases, thirty singles and a number of appearances with other artists.

== Albums ==
=== Studio albums ===
Title	Album details	Peak chart positions												Certifications
Title	Album details	UK	AUS	AUT	BEL	CAN	GER	NED	NZ	NOR	SWE	SWI	US	Certifications
Alf	Released: 5 November 1984; Label: Columbia	1	9	—	—	12	5	3	1	3	11	2	45	UK: 4× Platinum; CAN: Gold; GER: Platinum; NZ: Platinum
Raindancing	Released: 6 April 1987; Label: Columbia	2	15	23	—	36	3	5	1	1	4	4	94	UK: 2× Platinum; GER: Gold; NZ: Platinum
Hoodoo	Released: 22 April 1991; Label: Columbia	11	120	—	—	—	36	55	47	—	42	22	—	UK: Silver
Essex	Released: 21 March 1994; Label: Columbia	24	—	—	—	—	74	91	—	—	—	50	194	
Hometime	Released: 19 August 2002; Label: Sanctuary	18	—	—	—	—	69	—	—	—	—	—	—	UK: Gold
Voice	Released: 6 September 2004; Label: Sanctuary	7	—	—	—	—	—	76	—	—	—	—	—	UK: Gold
The Turn	Released: 15 October 2007; Label: W14 Music	21	—	—	—	—	—	—	—	—	—	—	—	
The Minutes	Released: 6 May 2013; Label: Cooking Vinyl	5	—	—	172	—	—	83	—	—	—	—	—	
Other	Released: 16 June 2017; Label: Cooking Vinyl	12	—	—	113	—	—	—	—	—	—	—	—	
Key	Released: 4 October 2024; Label: Cooking Vinyl	8	—	—	—	—	57	—	—	—	—	99	—	
"—" denotes items that did not chart or were not released in that territory.

=== Compilation albums ===
Title	Album details	Peak chart positions										Certifications
Title	Album details	UK	AUS	BEL	CAN	GER	IRE	NED	NZ	NOR	SWI	Certifications
Singles	Released: 27 May 1995; Label: Columbia	1	49	34	45	49	—	52	5	9	39	UK: 2× Platinum; NZ: Gold
The Essential	Released: 10 September 2001; Label: Columbia	16	—	—	—	—	—	—	—	—	—	UK: Gold
The Best of Alison Moyet	Released: 19 October 2009; Label: Modest/Sony Music	17	—	—	—	—	57	—	—	—	—	UK: Gold
"—" denotes items that did not chart or were not released in that territory.

=== Live albums ===
Title	Album details
Minutes and Seconds: Live	Released: 10 November 2014; Label: Cooking Vinyl
The Other Live Collection	Released: 20 April 2018; Label: Cooking Vinyl

== EPs ==
Title	EP details
Live at Bush Hall – EP	Released: 14 August 2014; Label: Cooking Vinyl
Live for Burberry – EP	Released: 22 September 2015; Label: Cooking Vinyl

== Singles ==
Year	Title	Peak chart positions												Certifications	Album
Year	Title	UK	BEL	AUS	CAN	GER	IRE	NED	NZ	NOR	SWE	SWI	US	Certifications	Album
1984	"Love Resurrection"	10	23	17	39	—	8	26	18	—	—	—	82		Alf
1984	"All Cried Out"	8	—	21	—	24	7	15	6	—	—	15	—	UK: Silver	Alf
1984	"Invisible"	21	34	16	20	22	6	—	4	—	18	25	31		Alf
1985	"That Ole Devil Called Love"	2	10	46	—	29	2	5	1	—	—	21	—	UK: Silver	Non-album single
1985	"For You Only"	—	—	—	—	7	—	—	—	—	—	—	—		Alf
1986	"Is This Love?"	3	5	13	—	15	4	16	7	3	5	20	—	UK: Silver	Raindancing
1987	"Weak in the Presence of Beauty"	6	18	30	—	18	4	25	7	4	—	23	—		Raindancing
1987	"Ordinary Girl"	43	31	—	—	—	22	—	49	—	—	—	—		Raindancing
1987	"Sleep Like Breathing"	80	—	—	—	—	—	—	—	—	—	—	—		Raindancing
1987	"Love Letters"	4	24	—	—	—	6	40	39	—	—	—	—	UK: Silver	Non-album single
1991	"It Won't Be Long"	50	—	153	—	—	—	43	—	—	—	—	—		Hoodoo
1991	"Wishing You Were Here"	72	—	197	—	—	—	—	—	—	—	—	—		Hoodoo
1991	"This House"	40	—	—	—	—	—	32	—	—	—	—	—		Hoodoo
1993	"Falling"	42	—	—	—	—	—	—	—	—	—	—	—		Essex
1994	"Whispering Your Name"	18	31	—	—	75	—	—	—	—	—	—	—		Essex
1994	"Getting into Something"	51	—	—	—	—	—	—	—	—	—	—	—		Essex
1994	"Ode to Boy"	59	—	—	—	—	—	—	—	—	—	—	—		Essex
1995	"The First Time Ever I Saw Your Face"	—	—	—	—	—	—	—	—	—	—	—	—		Singles
1995	"Solid Wood"	44	—	—	—	—	—	—	—	—	—	—	—		Singles
2002	"Should I Feel That It's Over"	144	—	—	—	—	—	—	—	—	—	—	—		Hometime
2002	"Do You Ever Wonder"	113	—	—	—	—	—	—	—	—	—	—	—		Hometime
2003	"More"	127	—	—	—	—	—	—	—	—	—	—	—		Hometime
2004	"Windmills of Your Mind"	—	—	—	—	—	—	—	—	—	—	—	—		Voice
2004	"Almost Blue"/"Alfie"	99	—	—	—	—	—	—	—	—	—	—	—		Voice
2006	"Slipping Away" (Moby feat. Alison Moyet)	53	—	—	—	63	—	—	—	—	—	—	—		Hotel (Moby album)
2007	"One More Time"	151	—	—	—	—	—	—	—	—	—	—	—		The Turn
2007	"A Guy Like You"	—	—	—	—	—	—	—	—	—	—	—	—		The Turn
2013	"When I Was Your Girl"	—	—	—	—	—	—	—	—	—	—	—	—		The Minutes
2013	"Love Reign Supreme"	—	—	—	—	—	—	—	—	—	—	—	—		The Minutes
2013	"Changeling"	—	—	—	—	—	—	—	—	—	—	—	—		The Minutes
2017	"Reassuring Pinches"	—	—	—	—	—	—	—	—	—	—	—	—		Other
2017	"The Rarest Birds"	—	—	—	—	—	—	—	—	—	—	—	—		Other
2024	"Such Small Ale"	—	—	—	—	—	—	—	—	—	—	—	—		Key
"—" denotes items that did not chart or were not released in that territory.

=== Promotional singles ===
Year	Single	Album	Notes
1991	"Hoodoo"	Hoodoo	US only
1991	"It Won't Be Long"	Hoodoo	US only
1991	"Back Where I Belong"	Hoodoo	UK only
1996	"Our Colander Eyes"	Non-album single	UK only

== Videography ==
Title	Year	Format
The Essential Alison Moyet	2002	DVD
One Blue Voice	2005	DVD

== Other appearances ==
- "The Coventry Carol" (from A Very Special Christmas, Vol. I), 1987.
- "My Best Day" (album track from Jollification by the Lightning Seeds), co-writer and vocals, 1994.
- "Make A Change" (album track from Nearly God by Tricky), co-writer and vocals, 1996.
- "What A Wonderful World" (Comic Relief CD single/cassingle only extra track, from When the Going Gets Tough by Boyzone), vocals, 1999.
- "Waiting" (by My Robot Friend), vocals, 2010.
- "Walking Down Madison" and "Head" (Live at Shepherd's Bush Empire, from 'A Concert For Kirsty MacColl'), 2013.

== See also ==
- List of songs recorded by Alison Moyet
