= List of songs recorded by Alison Moyet =

Songs recorded by Alison Moyet

This is a list of all songs recorded by Alison Moyet.

== Songs ==
Title	Year	Album	Author(s)
A Guy Like You	2007	The Turn	Alison Moyet, Pete Glenister
A Place to Stay	2013	The Minutes	Moyet, Guy Sigsworth
Alive	2017	Other	Moyet, Sigsworth
Almost Blue	2004	Voice	Declan Macmanus
All Cried Out	1984	Alf	Moyet, Steve Jolley, Tony Swain
All Signs of Life	2013	The Minutes	Moyet, Sigsworth
And I Know	1994	Essex	Moyet, Glenister
Another Living Day	1994	Essex	Moyet, Glenister
Anytime at All	2007	The Turn	Moyet, Glenister
Apple Kisses	2013	The Minutes	Moyet, Sigsworth
April 10th	2017	Other	Moyet, Sigsworth
Baby I Do	1984	B-side of "Love Resurrection"	Moyet, Jolley, Swain
Back Where I Belong	1991	Hoodoo	Moyet, Glenister
Beautiful	1992	Demo, released on Essex 2016 deluxe edition	Moyet, Glenister
Beautiful Gun	2017	Other	Moyet, Sigsworth
Blow Wind Blow	1987	Raindancing	Moyet, Jess Bailey
Blue	1995	B-side of "Solid Wood"	Moyet, Glenister
Boys Own	1994	Essex	Moyet, Glenister
Bye Bye Blackbird	2004	Voice	Mort Dixon, Ray Henderson
Can't Say It Like I Mean It	2007	The Turn	Moyet, Glenister
Changeling	2013	The Minutes	Moyet, Sigsworth
Come Back Home	1991	B-side of "This House"	Moyet, Dave Dix
The Coventry Carol	1987	A Very Special Christmas(various artists)	Traditional
Cry Me a River	2004	Voice	Arthur Hamilton
Dido's Lament: When I Am Laid in Earth	2004	Voice	Henry Purcell
Dig a Hole	1990	Demo, released on Hoodoo 2016 deluxe edition	Moyet, Dix
Do You Ever Wonder	2002	Hometime	Carlton McCarthy
Don't Burn Down the Bridge	1984	B-side of "That Ole Devil Called Love"	Ronnie Miller
Dorothy	1994	Essex	Moyet, Glenister
The English U	2017	Other	Moyet, Sigsworth, Richard Walters
Falling	1993	Essex	Moyet, Glenister
Filigree	2013	The Minutes	Moyet, Sigsworth
Find Me	1991	Hoodoo	Moyet, Glenister
Fire	2007	The Turn	Moyet, Glenister
The First Time Ever I Saw Your Face	1995	Singles	Ewan MacColl
Fool, Reconsider Me	2007	B-side of "One More Time"	Moyet, Glenister
Footsteps	1991	Hoodoo	Moyet, Glenister
For You Only	1984	Alf	Moyet, Jolley, Swain
Getting into Something	1994	Essex	Moyet, Glenister
God Give Me Strength	2004	Voice	Burt Bacharach, Macmanus
Happy Giddy	2017	Other	Moyet, Sigsworth
Hitch Hike	1984	B-side of "Invisible"	Alan Bergman, Marilyn Bergman, Michel Legrand
Home	2007	The Turn	Moyet, Glenister
Hometime	2002	Hometime	Moyet, Glenister
Honey for the Bees	1984	Alf	Moyet, Jolley, Swain
Hoodoo	1991	Hoodoo	Moyet, Glenister
Horizon Flame	2013	The Minutes	Moyet, Sigsworth
How Long	1997	Demo, released on Essex 2016 deluxe edition	Moyet, Glenister
I Germinate	2017	Other	Moyet, Sigsworth
If You Don't Come Back to Me	2002	Hometime	Moyet, Glenister
The Impervious Me	2024	Key	Moyet, Richard Oakes, Sean McGhee, John Garden
Invisible	1984	Alf	Lamont Dozier
Is This Love?	1986	Raindancing	Moyet, Jean Guiot
It Won't Be Long	1991	Hoodoo	Moyet, Glenister
It's Not the Thing, Henry	2007	The Turn	Moyet, Glenister
Je Crois Entendre Encore	2004	Voice	Georges Bizet
La Chanson des Vieux Amants	2004	Voice	Jacques Brel
Life in a Hole	1994	B-side of "Ode to Boy"	Moyet, Glenister
Love Letters	1987	Non-album single	Edward Heyman, Victor Young
Love Reign Supreme	2013	The Minutes	Moyet, Sigsworth
Love Resurrection	1984	Alf	Moyet, Jolley, Swain
Lover, Go	2017	Other	Moyet, Sigsworth, Lydia Kaye
The Man I Love	2004	Voice	George Gershwin, Ira Gershwin
The Man in the Wings	2007	The Turn	Moyet, Glenister
Mary, Don't Keep Me Waiting	2002	Hometime	Moyet, Glenister
(Meeting With My) Main Man	1991	Hoodoo	Moyet, Glenister
Momma Momma	2007	B-side of "One More Time"	Melanie Safka
Money Mile	1984	Alf	Moyet, Jolley, Swain
More	2002	Hometime	Moyet, Glenister
My Right A.R.M.	1991	Hoodoo	Moyet, Glenister
Ne Me Quitte Pas	1994	B-side of "Getting into Something"	Jacques Brel
Never Too Late	1991	Hoodoo	Moyet, Dean Kennedy, Warren Kennedy
Nobody's Darling	2002	B-side of "Should I Feel That It's Over"	Moyet, Mark Saunders
Ode to Boy	1994	Essex	Moyet
Ode to Boy II	1994	Essex	Moyet
One More Time	2007	The Turn	Moyet, Glenister
Ordinary Girl	1987	Raindancing	Moyet, Bailey, Rick Driscoll
Other	2017	Other	Moyet, Joe Duddell
Our Colander Eyes	1996	Non-album promotional single	Moyet, Glenister
Palm of Your Hand (Cloak & Dagger)	1987	B-side of "Ordinary Girl"	Dan Hartman
The Rarest Birds	2017	Other	Moyet, Garden, McGhee
Reassuring Pinches	2017	Other	Moyet, Sigsworth, Garden, McGhee
Remind Yourself	2013	The Minutes	Moyet, Sigsworth
Right as Rain	2013	The Minutes	Moyet, Sigsworth
Rise	1991	Hoodoo	Moyet, Matt Irving, Mike Pinder
Rung by the Tide	2013	The Minutes	Moyet, Sigsworth
Satellite	1994	Essex	Moyet, Glenister
Say It	2002	Hometime	McCarthy, Eg White
Sea Child	2002	Demo, released on Hometime 2015 deluxe edition	Moyet, Glenister
Senses	2007	Released on The Turn 2015 deluxe edition	Moyet, Glenister
The Sharpest Corner (Hollow)	2007	The Turn	Moyet, Glenister
Should I Feel That It's Over	2002	Hometime	Moyet, Glenister
Ski	2002	Hometime	Moyet, B. Gray, David Ballard, Grant Clarke, John Lewis
Sleep Like Breathing	1987	Raindancing	David Freeman, Joseph Hughes
Smaller	2007	The Turn	Moyet, Glenister
So Am I	1994	Essex	Moyet, Ian Broudie
Solid Wood	1995	Singles	Moyet
Stay	1987	Raindancing	Moyet, Bailey, Driscoll
Steal Me Blind	1984	Alf	Moyet, Jolley, Swain
Such Small Ale	2024	Key	Moyet, Oakes, McGhee
Sunderland Glynn	1994	B-side of "Ode to Boy"	Moyet, Glenister
Take My Imagination to Bed	1987	B-side of "Weak in the Presence of Beauty"	Freeman, Hughes
Take of Me	1991	B-side of "It Won't Be Long", Essex (1994)	Moyet, Glenister
That Ole Devil Called Love	1984	Non-album single	Allan Roberts, Doris Fisher
There Are Worse Things I Could Do	2001	The Essential Alison Moyet	Jim Jacobs, Warren Casey
This House	1991	Hoodoo	Moyet
To Work on You	1987	B-side of "Weak in the Presence of Beauty"	Moyet, Robert S. Nevil
Tongue Tied	2002	B-side of "Should I Feel That It's Over"	Moyet, Glenister
The Train I Ride	2002	Hometime	Moyet, Glenister
Twisting the Knife	1984	Alf	Moyet, Jolley, Swain
You Got Me Wrong	1987	Raindancing	Moyet
The Wraggle-Taggle Gypsies-O!	2004	Voice	Traditional
Weak in the Presence of Beauty	1987	Raindancing	Michael Ward, Rob Clarke
What a Wonderful World	1999	B-side of "When the Going Gets Tough" by Boyzone (Comic Relief single)	Bob Thiele (as George Douglas)
What Are You Doing the Rest of Your Life?	2004	Voice	Bergman, Bergman, Legrand
When I Say (No Giveaway)	1987	Raindancing	Moyet, Bailey, Driscoll
When I Was Your Girl	2013	The Minutes	Moyet, Sigsworth
Where Hides Sleep	1984	Alf	Moyet, Jolley, Swain
Whispering Your Name	1994	Essex	Jules Shear
Windmills of Your Mind	2004	Voice	Bergman, Bergman, Legrand
Wishing You Were Here	1991	Hoodoo	Moyet, Glenister
Without You	1987	Raindancing	Moyet
World Without End	2007	The Turn	Moyet, Glenister
Yesterday's Flame	2002	Hometime	Moyet, Glenister
You and Me	1987	Demo, released on Raindancing 2016 deluxe edition	Moyet, Dix
You Don't Have to Go	2002	Hometime	Moyet, Glenister

== As a featured artist ==
Title	Year	Album	Author(s)	Notes
Let's Get Personal	1986	Gravity	Hartman, Charlie Midnight, Moyet	Vocal trade-offs and background vocals on James Brown track
Make a Change	1996	Nearly God	Moyet, Tricky	Guest vocals on Tricky solo album track
My Best Day	1994	Jollification	Broudie, Moyet	Guest vocals on The Lightning Seeds album track
Skipping Stones	2001	Re-Members Only	Broudie, Moyet	Guest vocals on King Britt Presents Sylk 130 album track
Waiting	2009	Soft-Core	My Robot Friend	Guest vocals on My Robot Friend album track
