= Singles (Alison Moyet album) =

Greatest hits album by Alison Moyet
- Released: 22 May 1995
- Recorded: 1982–1995
- Genre: Pop
- Length: 74:46
- Label: Columbia

Alison Moyet chronology
| Essex (1994) | Singles (1995) | The Essential Alison Moyet (2001) |

Professional ratings
Review scores
| Source | Rating |
|---|---|
| AllMusic | 4.5/5 stars |
| The Baltimore Sun | (favorable) |
| NME | 7/10 |
| Spin | (favorable) |

Singles is the first greatest hits album by English singer Alison Moyet, released on 22 May 1995 by Columbia Records. The album includes two previously unreleased tracks, Moyet's version of "The First Time Ever I Saw Your Face" and "Solid Wood", as well as a number of hits from the singer's stint in 1980s synth-pop duo Yazoo.

The album was re-released the following year as a two-disc set, Singles/Live, the second disc being a live recording of Moyet on tour, and again in 2000 as a one-disc set under the title Best of The Best: Gold.

== Critical reception ==
David Quantick of NME called Singles "about as spot-on as an Alison Moyet compilation can be".

== Track listing ==
1. "The First Time Ever I Saw Your Face" (Ewan MacColl) – 3:19
  - Previously unreleased
2. "Only You" (Vince Clarke) – 3:12
  - Performed by Yazoo, from 1982 album Upstairs at Eric's
3. "Nobody's Diary" (Moyet) – 4:31
  - Performed by Yazoo, from 1983 album You and Me Both
4. "Situation" (UK Mix) (Vince Clarke, Alison Moyet) – 2:24
  - Performed by Yazoo, a 1982 B-side.
  - North American editions have instead "Winter Kills" (Moyet), performed by Yazoo, from 1982 album Upstairs at Eric's
5. "Love Resurrection" (Steve Jolley, Moyet, Swain) – 3:52
  - From 1984 album Alf
6. "All Cried Out" (7" Edit) (Jolley, Moyet, Swain) – 3:42
  - From 1984 album Alf
7. "Invisible" (Lamont Dozier) – 4:08
  - From 1984 album Alf
8. "That Ole Devil Called Love" (Doris Fisher, Allan Roberts) – 3:05
  - 1985 non-album single
9. "Is This Love?" (Jean Guiot, Moyet) – 4:01
  - From 1987 album Raindancing
10. "Weak in the Presence of Beauty" (Michael Ward, Robert E. Clarke ) – 3:33
  - From 1987 album Raindancing
11. "Ordinary Girl" (7" Edit) (Bailey, Driscoll, Moyet) – 3:08
  - From 1987 album Raindancing
12. "Love Letters" (Edward Heyman, Victor Young) – 2:51
  - 1987 non-album single
13. "It Won't Be Long" (Pete Glenister, Moyet) – 4:09
  - From 1991 album Hoodoo
14. "Wishing You Were Here" (Glenister, Moyet) – 3:58
  - From 1991 album Hoodoo
15. "This House" (Moyet) – 3:55
  - From 1991 album Hoodoo
16. "Falling" (Glenister, Moyet) – 3:39
  - From 1994 album Essex
17. "Whispering Your Name" (Single Mix) (Jules Shear) – 3:49
  - From 1994 album Essex
18. "Getting into Something" (Glenister, Moyet) – 4:15
  - From 1994 album Essex
19. "Ode to Boy II" (Moyet) – 2:57
  - From 1994 album Essex
20. "Solid Wood" (Moyet) – 4:38
  - Previously unreleased

=== Singles/Live bonus disc (Live) ===
1. "Getting into Something" (Glenister, Moyet) – 5:16
2. "Chain of Fools" (Covay) – 5:05
3. "Love Letters" (Heyman, Young) – 4:43
4. "All Cried Out" (Jolley, Moyet, Swain) – 4:08
5. "Dorothy" (Glenister, Moyet) – 3:24
6. "Falling" (Glenister, Moyet) – 3:44
7. "Ode to Boy" (Moyet) – 3:07
8. "Is This Love?" (Guiot, Moyet) – 3:59
9. "Nobody's Diary" (Moyet) – 4:30
10. "Whispering Your Name" (Shear) – 3:53
11. "There Are Worse Things I Could Do" (Casey, Jacobs) – 3:05
- Recorded at the Royal Albert Hall, London, and The Royal Concert Hall, Glasgow.

== Personnel ==
- Pete Glenister – production (tracks 1, 13, 14, 19)
- Mark Saunders – production (track 1)
- Eric Radcliffe – production (tracks 2–4)
- Yazoo – production (tracks 2–4)
- Steve Jolley – production (tracks 5–7)
- Tony Swain – production (tracks 5–7)
- Pete Wingfield – production (track 8)
- Jimmy Iovine – production (tracks 9–11)
- Manu Guiot – production (track 9)
- Steve Brown – production (track 12)
- Dave Dix – production (track 15)
- Ian Broudie – production (tracks 16–18)

== Charts ==
=== Weekly charts ===
Weekly chart performance for Singles
| Chart (1995) | Peak position |
|---|---|
| Australian Albums (ARIA) | 49 |
| Belgian Albums (Ultratop Flanders) | 34 |
| Belgian Albums (Ultratop Wallonia) | 47 |
| Dutch Albums (Album Top 100) | 52 |
| European Albums (Music & Media) | 14 |
| German Albums (Offizielle Top 100) | 49 |
| Irish Albums (IFPI) | 2 |
| New Zealand Albums (RMNZ) | 5 |
| Norwegian Albums (VG-lista) | 9 |
| Scottish Albums (OCC) | 3 |
| Swiss Albums (Schweizer Hitparade) | 39 |
| UK Albums (OCC) | 1 |

=== Year-end charts ===
Year-end chart performance for Singles
| Chart (1995) | Position |
|---|---|
| European Albums (Music & Media) | 91 |
| UK Albums (OCC) | 32 |

== Certifications ==
Certifications for Singles
| Region | Certification | Certified units/sales |
|---|---|---|
| New Zealand (RMNZ) | Gold | 7,500^{^} |
| United Kingdom (BPI) | 2× Platinum | 600,000^{^} |
^{^} Shipments figures based on certification alone.
