= The Best of Alison Moyet =

Compilation album by Alison Moyet
- Released: 19 October 2009
- Genre: Pop
- Length: 77:59
- Label: Sony Music

Alison Moyet chronology
The Turn (2007)	The Best of Alison Moyet (2009)	The Minutes (2013)

The Best of Alison Moyet is a compilation album by British singer-songwriter Alison Moyet, released in 2009. Moyet's first compilation album since 2001's The Essential, The Best of contains twenty tracks, with selections from her seven solo albums.

In addition to the standard edition, a limited edition, two-disc The Best of – 25 Years Revisited version was also released, which features a selection of eleven songs re-interpreted and recorded live.

The album peaked at No. 17 in the UK, remaining in the Top 100 for thirteen weeks. Moyet supported the release with the 25 Years Revisited tour, which spanned 26 venues across the UK and Ireland during November–December 2009.

== Critical reception ==
Professional ratings
Review scores
Source	Rating
AllMusic	4/5 stars

James Christopher Monger of AllMusic commented: "The remasters sounds exceptional, and nearly all of her most notable singles are here, but listeners just looking for the Yaz classic "Don't Go" would be better off with 2003's Essential compilation, as it contains the best of both worlds."

== Track listing ==
No.	Title	Writer(s)	Length
1.	"Love Resurrection"	Alison Moyet, Steve Jolley, Tony Swain	3:52
2.	"All Cried Out"	Moyet, Jolley, Swain	3:41
3.	"Invisible"	Lamont Dozier	4:00
4.	"Where Hides Sleep"	Moyet, Jolley, Swain	3:49
5.	"That Ole Devil Called Love"	Allan Roberts, Doris Fisher	3:05
6.	"Is This Love?"	Moyet, Jean Guiot	3:58
7.	"Weak in the Presence of Beauty"	Michael Ward, Rob Clarke	3:46
8.	"Ordinary Girl"	Moyet, Jess Bailey, Rick Driscoll	3:25
9.	"Love Letters"	Edward Heyman, Victor Young	2:50
10.	"It Won't Be Long"	Moyet, Pete Glenister	4:15
11.	"This House"	Moyet	3:56
12.	"Hoodoo"	Moyet, Pete Glenister	4:41
13.	"Footsteps"	Moyet, Pete Glenister	5:00
14.	"Whispering Your Name"	Jules Shear	3:28
15.	"Should I Feel That It's Over"	Moyet, Pete Glenister	4:01
16.	"More"	Moyet, Pete Glenister	3:59
17.	"Yesterday's Flame"	Moyet, Pete Glenister	4:28
18.	"Windmills of Your Mind"	Alan Bergman, Marilyn Bergman, Michel Legrand	3:50
19.	"Almost Blue"	Elvis Costello	3:53
20.	"One More Time"	Moyet, Pete Glenister	4:02

25 Years Revisited edition – Disc 2
No.	Title	Writer(s)	Length
1.	"All Cried Out"	Moyet, Jolley, Swain	4:52
2.	"Ski"	Moyet, David Ballard, Grant Clarke, Bruce Gray, John Lewis	4:40
3.	"Hoodoo"	Moyet, Glenister	4:04
4.	"Ordinary Girl"	Moyet, Bailey, Driscoll	3:17
5.	"Midnight"	Moyet	4:39
6.	"This House"	Moyet	3:48
7.	"Find Me"	Moyet, Gerry Colvin	4:46
8.	"Footsteps"	Moyet, Glenister	3:32
9.	"Is This Love?"	Moyet, Guiot	3:54
10.	"Situation"	Moyet, Vince Clarke	2:09
11.	"Wishing You Were Here"	Moyet, Glenister	3:40

== Personnel ==
- Mazen Murad – remastering
- Geoff Pesche – remastering (Disc 2 of 25 Years Revisited only)
- Nicole Nodland – cover photo
- Steve Stacey – sleeve design
- Andy Hayes – album design, layout

== Charts ==
Chart performance for The Best of Alison Moyet
Chart (2009–2010)	Peak position
Greek Albums (IFPI)	25
Irish Albums (IRMA)	57
Scottish Albums (OCC)	31
UK Albums (OCC)	17
