= Minutes and Seconds: Live =

Live album by Alison Moyet
- Released: 10 November 2014
- Genres: Synth-pop; pop rock
- Length: 54:17
- Label: Cooking Vinyl

Alison Moyet chronology
The Minutes (2013)	Minutes and Seconds: Live (2014)	Other (2017)

Minutes and Seconds: Live is the first full-length live album by English singer-songwriter Alison Moyet, released on 10 November 2014 by Cooking Vinyl. The album features live cuts from her 2013–2014 The Minutes Tour. While the majority of the set consists of new material from her 2013 album, The Minutes, the set also includes songs from Moyet's back catalogue, including songs by her former band, Yazoo. The album's recordings were captured at various venues. Moyet added and discarded songs throughout the run of the tour, many of which did not make this release.

== Track listing ==
No.	Title	Writer(s)	Length
1.	"Horizon Flame" (from The Minutes, 2013)	Alison Moyet, Guy Sigsworth	3:57
2.	"When I Was Your Girl" (from The Minutes, 2013)	Moyet, Sigsworth	3:53
3.	"Ordinary Girl" (from Raindancing, 1987)	Jess Bailey, Rick Driscoll, Moyet	3:35
4.	"Remind Yourself" (from The Minutes, 2013)	Moyet, Sigsworth, Cass Lowe	3:57
5.	"Is This Love?" (from Raindancing, 1987)	Jean Guiot, Moyet	4:55
6.	"Winter Kills" (from Yazoo, Upstairs at Eric's, 1982)	Moyet	6:56
7.	"Filigree" (from The Minutes, 2013)	Moyet, Sigsworth, Lowe	3:45
8.	"Only You" (from Yazoo, Upstairs at Eric's, 1982)	Vince Clarke	3:06
9.	"Changeling" (from The Minutes, 2013)	Moyet, Sigsworth	3:23
10.	"This House" (from Hoodoo, 1991)	Moyet	3:55
11.	"All Signs Of Life" (from The Minutes, 2013)	Moyet, Sigsworth	4:01
12.	"All Cried Out" (from Alf, 1984)	Steve Jolley, Moyet, Tony Swain	4:55
13.	"Situation" (from Yazoo, Upstairs at Eric's, 1982)	Moyet, Clarke	4:03
Total length:			54:17

== Personnel ==
Credits for Minutes and Seconds – Live adapted from liner notes.

- Alison Moyet – vocals
- John Garden – MD, keyboards, guitars, programming
- Sean McGhee – backing vocals, synthesizer, guitar, programming
- Guy Sigsworth, Chris Elms, John Garden and Sean McGhee – arrangement of tracks 1, 2, 4, 7, 9, 11, 13
- John Garden and Sean McGhee – arrangement of tracks 3, 5, 6, 8, 10, 12
- Chris Fillery – recording
- Sean McGhee and John Garden – mixing
- Simon Heyworth and Andy Miles – mastering
