= Key (Alison Moyet album) =

Studio album by Alison Moyet
- Released: 4 October 2024
- Recorded: 2023
- Genre: Alternative pop; synth-pop
- Length: 73:37
- Label: Cooking Vinyl
- Producer: Sean McGhee

Alison Moyet chronology
The Other Live Collection (2017)	Key (2024)

Alternative cover
- Amazon Exclusive Cover

Alternative cover
- Moyet Moments Edition Cover

Singles from Key
- 1. "Such Small Ale" Released: 13 June 2024

Key is the tenth studio album by English singer-songwriter Alison Moyet, released on 4 October 2024, by Cooking Vinyl.

The album reached number 8 on the UK Albums Chart. It contains 16 reworked songs from Moyet's solo catalog - encompassing songs that had been released as singles in their original form as well as deep cuts - along with two brand new tracks. A world tour in support of the album took place in 2025. The album coincides with the singer's 40th anniversary as a solo artist.

Moyet premiered the first single, "Such Small Ale", on Vernon Kay's mid-morning show on BBC Radio 2 and BBC Sounds 13 June 2024.

== Track listing ==
Key track listing
No.	Title	Writer(s)	Originally from	Length
1.	"Where Hides Sleep"	Steve Jolley, Alison Moyet, Tony Swain	Alf	3:57
2.	"All Cried Out"	Moyet, Jolley, Swain	Alf	3:36
3.	"Such Small Ale"	Moyet, Richard Oakes, Sean McGhee	Previously unreleased	4:21
4.	"All Signs of Life"	Moyet, Guy Sigsworth	The Minutes	3:56
5.	"Can't Say It Like I Mean It"	Moyet, Pete Glenister	The Turn	5:21
6.	"Fire"	Moyet, Glenister	The Turn	4:26
7.	"Filigree"	Moyet, Sigsworth	The Minutes	4:48
8.	"The Impervious Me"	Moyet, McGhee, John Garden	Previously unreleased	4:19
9.	"More"	Moyet, Glenister	Hometime	3:23
10.	"Is This Love?"	Moyet, Jean Guiot	Raindancing	4:47
11.	"Tongue Tied"	Moyet, Glenister	Hometime	3:11
12.	"My Right A.R.M."	Moyet, Glenister	Hoodoo	4:39
13.	"So Am I"	Moyet, Ian Broudie	Essex	4:00
14.	"My Best Day"	Moyet, Broudie	Jollification	4:08
15.	"World Without End"	Moyet, Glenister	The Turn	3:00
16.	"This House"	Moyet	Hoodoo	3:50
17.	"Love Resurrection"	Jolley, Moyet, Swain	Alf	3:54
18.	"You Don't Have to Go"	Moyet, Glenister	Hometime	4:01
Total length:				73:37

== Personnel ==
=== Musicians ===
- Alison Moyet – lead and backing vocals (all tracks), arranger (tracks 3 & 8)
- Sean McGhee – synthesizers, keyboards, programming, electric bass, guitars, additional backing vocals
- Richard Oakes – guitars (tracks 3, 4, 9, 13, 14 & 18), arranger (track 3)
- David Ballard – drums and percussion (tracks 3 & 8)
- John Garden – piano (track 7), piano and synthesisers (track 8), arranger (tracks 8 & 10)
- Chris Wood – electric guitar (track 7)
- Ben Nicholls – double bass (track 7)

=== Technical ===
- Sean McGhee – producer and arranger (all tracks), mixer (track 7)
- Chris Elms – mixer (tracks 1–6 and 8–18)
- Brendan Cox – vocal recording engineer (tracks 1–6, 8–10 and 12–18), drum recording engineer (tracks 3 & 8)
- Jake Stainer – assistant engineer (tracks 3 & 8)
- Simon Heyworth – mastering engineer
- Bill Sellar – mastering engineer

=== Artwork ===
- Alison Moyet – artwork, photography
- Naomi Davison – photography
- Tommy Evans – graphic design

== Charts ==
Chart performance for Key
Chart (2024)	Peak position
German Albums (Offizielle Top 100)	57
Scottish Albums (OCC)	5
Swiss Albums (Schweizer Hitparade)	99
UK Albums (OCC)	8
UK Independent Albums (OCC)	3
