= The Other Live Collection =

Live album by Alison Moyet
- Released: 20 April 2018
- Length: 53:09
- Label: Cooking Vinyl

Alison Moyet chronology
Other (2017)	The Other Live Collection (2018)	Key (2024)

The Other Live Collection is the second full-length live album by English singer-songwriter Alison Moyet, released on 20 April 2018 by Cooking Vinyl. The album features live cuts from the Other Tour of 2017, her first world tour in 30 years.

== Critical reception ==
Professional ratings
Review scores
Source	Rating
The Irish News	8/10 stars

Lucy Mapstone, in a review of the album for The Irish News, described it as a "delight" and a showcase for Moyet's "stunning vocals". The reviewer concluded: "In an album of highlights, Moyet proves that she is still at the top of her game in a career spanning more than three decades."

== Track listing ==
No.	Title	Writer(s)	Length
1.	"I Germinate" (from Other, 2017)	Alison Moyet, Guy Sigsworth	3:51
2.	"Wishing You Were Here" (from Hoodoo, 1991)	Moyet, Pete Glenister	3:49
3.	"Ski" (from Hometime, 2002)	David Ballard, Grant Clarke, Bruce Gray, John Lewis, Moyet	4:20
4.	"The English U" (from Other, 2017)	Moyet, Sigsworth, Richard Walters	5:12
5.	"Only You" (from Yazoo, Upstairs at Eric's, 1982)	Vince Clarke	3:12
6.	"Beautiful Gun" (from Other, 2017)	Moyet, Sigsworth	3:20
7.	"The Sharpest Corner (Hollow)" (from The Turn, 2007)	Moyet, Pete Glenister	4:33
8.	"All Cried Out" (Alf, 1984)	Steve Jolley, Moyet, Tony Swain	3:50
9.	"The Man in the Wings" (from The Turn, 2007)	Moyet, Glenister	5:07
10.	"Other" (from Other, 2017)	Moyet, Joe Duddell	3:44
11.	"The Rarest Birds" (from Other, 2017)	Moyet, John Garden, Sean McGhee	4:16
12.	"Right as Rain" (from The Minutes, 2013)	Moyet, Sigsworth, Andy Page	3:52
13.	"Whispering Your Name" (from Essex, 1994)	Jules Shear	4:08
Total length:			53:09

== Charts ==
Chart (2018)	Peak position
UK Independent Albums Chart	12
