= The Essential Alison Moyet =

Greatest hits album by Alison Moyet
- Released: 10 September 2001
- Recorded: 1982–2001
- Genre: Pop
- Length: 73:48
- Label: Columbia/Sony Music Entertainment

Alison Moyet chronology
Singles (1995)	The Essential Alison Moyet (2001)	Hometime (2002)

Professional ratings
Review scores
Source	Rating
Allmusic	4/5 stars

The Essential Alison Moyet is a compilation album, relatively similar to Singles, the 1995 greatest hits album of recordings by singer/songwriter Alison Moyet. The album was released in 2001 by Sony Music Entertainment in response to renewed interest in the singer, after she was finally released from her contract with the label and able to sign with Sanctuary Records, regain the artistic control of her musical output and move back into the public eye - resulting in 2002 comeback album Hometime. However, there are some differences in the track listings of the two Sony compilations. The Essential Alison Moyet excludes "Only You", "Situation', "Ordinary Girl", "Ode To Boy II", "The First Time Ever I Saw Your Face" and "Solid Wood", and replaces them with "Don't Go", "Winter Kills", "Blue" and "Our Colander Eyes" (the latter two recorded in 1995/1996, and listed in the wrong order in accompanying material) plus cover versions "Ne Me Quitte Pas" and "There Are Worse Things I Could Do".

== Track listing ==
1. "Don't Go" (Vince Clarke) - 2:51
  - Performed by Yazoo, from 1982 album Upstairs at Eric's
2. "Nobody's Diary" (Moyet) - 4:31
  - Performed by Yazoo, from 1983 album You and Me Both
3. "Winter Kills" (Alison Moyet) - 4:04
  - Performed by Yazoo, from 1982 album Upstairs at Eric's
4. "Love Resurrection" (Jolley, Moyet, Swain) - 3:52
  - From 1984 album Alf
5. "All Cried Out" (7" Edit) (Jolley, Moyet, Swain) - 3:42
  - From 1984 album Alf
6. "Invisible" (Lamont Dozier) - 4:08
  - From 1984 album Alf
7. "That Ole Devil Called Love" (Fisher, Roberts) - 3:05
  - 1985 non-album single
8. "Is This Love" (Guiot, Moyet) - 4:01
  - From 1987 album Raindancing
9. "Weak in the Presence of Beauty" (Michael Ward, Robert E. Clarke ) - 3:33
  - From 1987 album Raindancing
10. "Love Letters" (Heyman, Young) - 2:51
  - 1987 non-album single
11. "It Won't Be Long" (Pete Glenister, Moyet) - 4:09
  - From 1991 album Hoodoo
12. "Wishing You Were Here" (Glenister, Moyet) - 3:58
  - From 1991 album Hoodoo
13. "This House" (Moyet) - 3:55
  - From 1991 album Hoodoo
14. "Falling" (Glenister, Moyet) - 3:39
  - From 1994 album Essex
15. "Whispering Your Name" (Single Mix) (Shear) - 3:49
  - From 1994 album Essex
16. "Getting Into Something" (Glenister, Moyet) - 4:15
  - From 1994 album Essex
17. "Blue" (Glenister, Moyet) - 3:21
  - Recorded 1995, previously issued on single "Solid Wood"
18. "Our Colander Eyes" (Glenister, Moyet) - 3:32
  - Recorded 1996, previously issued as promo single.
19. "Ne Me Quitte Pas" (Acoustic) (Jacques Brel) - 3:45
  - Previously issued on single "Getting Into Something"
20. "There Are Worse Things I Could Do" (Casey, Jacobs) - 2:27
  - Studio version. Previously unreleased.

== Production tracks 17–20 ==
- "Blue" - mixed by Bob Kraushaar
- "Our Colander Eyes" - produced by Mike Hedges, mixed by Corin Dingley
- "Ne Me Quitte Pas" - produced by Victor van Vugt
- "There Are Worse Things I Could Do" - engineer Neil Brockbank
