= Other (Alison Moyet album) =

Studio album by Alison Moyet
- Released: 16 June 2017
- Recorded: 2016–2017
- Studio: Frou Frou Central (London)
- Genre: Electropop
- Length: 41:07
- Label: Cooking Vinyl
- Producer: Guy Sigsworth

Alison Moyet chronology
Minutes and Seconds - Live (2014)	Other (2017)	The Other Live Collection (2017)

Singles from Other
- 1. "Reassuring Pinches" Released: 30 April 2017; 2. "The Rarest Birds" Released: 4 June 2017

Professional ratings
Aggregate scores
Source	Rating
Metacritic	(80/100)
Review scores
Source	Rating
AllMusic	4/5 stars
Fortitude Magazine	9.5/10 stars
The Herald	(no rating)
Louder Than War	8.5/10
Mojo	4/5 stars
musicOMH	4/5 stars
Q	4/5 stars
Record Collector	4/5 stars
SLUG Magazine	(no rating)
The Spill Magazine	4/5 stars
theMusic.com.au	3.5/5 stars
Uncut	3.5/5 stars

Other is the ninth studio album by English singer-songwriter Alison Moyet, released on 16 June 2017, by Cooking Vinyl.

It is her first album of new material since 2013's The Minutes, which saw her returning to her electronic music roots.

== Background ==
On the subject of the album and specifically the meaning of the title Other, Moyet stated, "For me, making a record at this age, lyrically, is a different proposition. Observation in most cases replaces emotion. The invisibility of middle/aged woman rather thrills me and instead I watch." The album's subject matter includes topics such as dyslexia, locked-in syndrome, diversity, Persephone, perseverance, and the Internet. Moyet stated that the lyrics reflected a personal interpretation of these themes and encouraged listeners to form their own interpretations.

In July 2013, Moyet revealed that she had begun writing new material for the follow-up to her eighth studio album, The Minutes. Studio sessions commenced in October 2016. She previewed a new song, "Other", from the then yet-to-be-titled album, live at The Lexington for Cooking Vinyl's 30th Anniversary event on 5 December 2016.

On 17 March 2017, Moyet and her team revealed the title of the album as Other, along with describing it as an 'intelligent, adventurous electronic pop,' co-produced by Guy Sigsworth. The album became available to purchase for pre-release, along with the album's title track. A music video for "Other" was uploaded to Moyet's YouTube account.

== Singles ==
Moyet announced and debuted a radio edit of the album's first official single, "Reassuring Pinches" on 29 April 2017, on Graham Norton's BBC Radio 2 show.

A music video for "The Rarest Birds", directed by Steve Gullick, premiered on 20 July 2017. The video was filmed in Brighton and features her daughter Caitlin Ballard. On the song, Moyet states, "The Rarest Birds is a paean to LGBTQ, to Brighton, to coming out after the darkest nights into the arms of those that delight in your flight. From me to you." Moyet performed the song live on The Graham Norton Show.

== Promotion ==
=== The Other Tour ===
From September through December 2017, Moyet embarked on her first world tour in 30 years in support of the album, The Other Tour. Recordings from the tour were released on The Other Live Collection.

== Track listing ==
No.	Title	Writer(s)	Length
1.	"I Germinate"	Alison Moyet, Guy Sigsworth	3:38
2.	"Lover, Go"	Moyet, Sigsworth, Lydia Kaye	4:03
3.	"The English U"	Moyet, Sigsworth, Richard Walters	5:02
4.	"The Rarest Birds"	Moyet, John Garden, Sean McGhee	4:37
5.	"Beautiful Gun"	Moyet, Sigsworth	3:10
6.	"Reassuring Pinches"	Moyet, Sigsworth, Garden, McGhee	4:01
7.	"April 10th"	Moyet, Sigsworth	4:42
8.	"Other"	Moyet, Joe Duddell	3:31
9.	"Happy Giddy"	Moyet, Sigsworth	3:16
10.	"Alive"	Moyet, Sigsworth	5:07
Total length:			41:07

Deluxe Edition (2026) – Disc 2
No.	Title	Writer(s)	Length
1.	"I Germinate" (Live)	Moyet, Sigsworth	3:50
2.	"Wishing You Were Here" (Live)	Moyet, Pete Glenister	3:48
3.	"Ski" (Live)	Moyet, John Lewis, Bruce Gray, Gary Clark, Dave Ballard	4:19
4.	"The English U" (Live)	Moyet, Sigsworth, Walters	3:11
5.	"Only You" (Live)	Vince Clarke	3:12
6.	"Beautiful Gun" (Live)	Moyet, Sigsworth	3:19
7.	"The Sharpest Corner (Hollow)" (Live)	Moyet, Glenister	4:32
8.	"All Cried Out" (Live)	Moyet, Steve Jolley, Tony Swain	3:50
9.	"The Man in the Wings" (Live)	Moyet, Glenister	5:07
10.	"Other" (Live)	Moyet, Duddell	3:44
11.	"The Rarest Birds" (Live)	Moyet, John Garden, Sean McGhee	4:16
12.	"Right as Rain" (Live)	Moyet, Sigsworth, Page	3:51
13.	"Whispering Your Name" (Live)	Jules Shear	4:07

== Personnel ==
Credits for Other adapted from liner notes.

- Alison Moyet – lyrics and vocals
- Guy Sigsworth – strings, synthesisers, piano, harpsichord, guitar, bass, sound design
- Chris Elms – programming (tracks 1–4, 6–10), additional guitar (track 9), mixing (tracks 1–4, 6–10), engineering (tracks 1–4, 6–10)
- Jake Miller – programming (tracks 1–4, 5–10), additional guitar/slide guitar (track 5), additional guitar (track 9), mixing (tracks 5, 8), engineering (tracks 1–4, 5–10)
- Caitlin Ballard – additional background vocals (track 3)
- Tim Debney – mastering at Fluid Mastering
- Steve Coats-Dennis – digital manager
- Steve Gullick – photography
- Richard Griffiths – management
- Harry Magee – management
- Georgie Gibbon – management

== Charts ==
Chart performance for Other
Chart (2017)	Peak position
Belgian Albums (Ultratop Flanders)	113
Irish Albums (IRMA)	91
New Zealand Heatseeker Albums (RMNZ)	5
Scottish Albums (Official Charts)	14
UK Albums (Official Charts)	12
UK Independent Albums (Official Charts)	3
US Independent Albums (Billboard)	32

== Release history ==
Region	Date	Format(s)	Label	Ref.
Worldwide	16 June 2017	CD; LP; digital download; cassette	Cooking Vinyl	
