= Ordinary Girl =

Ordinary Girl may refer to:

- "Ordinary Girl" (Alison Moyet song), 1987
- "Ordinary Girl" (Hannah Montana song), 2010
- "Ordinary Girl", a 2003 song by Bic Runga
- "Ordinary Girl", a song by Sean Kingston from his 2013 album Back 2 Life
- "Ordinary Girl", performed by China Forbes, the opening theme for the TV series Clueless
- Ordinary Girl? a 2018 EP by The Featherz and its title track
