= The Minutes (album) =

Studio album by Alison Moyet
- Released: 3 May 2013
- Recorded: 2011–2013
- Studio: Frou Frou North (London)
- Genres: Synth-pop; pop rock
- Length: 40:43
- Label: Cooking Vinyl
- Producer: Guy Sigsworth

Alison Moyet chronology
The Best of Alison Moyet (2009)	The Minutes (2013)	Minutes and Seconds: Live (2014)

Singles from The Minutes
- 1. "When I Was Your Girl" Released: 1 April 2013; 2. "Love Reign Supreme" Released: 1 July 2013; 3. "Changeling" Released: 14 October 2013

The Minutes (stylised as the minutes) is the eighth solo studio album by English singer-songwriter Alison Moyet, released on 3 May 2013 by Cooking Vinyl.

It is the first album of new material released since 2007's The Turn, and marked a return to her electronic roots. Although while creating the album Moyet stated that it was not aimed at the charts, it debuted at number five on the UK Albums Chart with first-week sales of 13,536 copies, Moyet's highest-charting studio album since Raindancing reached number two in 1987. The Minutes received overwhelmingly positive reviews from music critics, many of whom referred to the album as her "best in decades".

== Background ==
Moyet announced on BBC Radio 6 Music that her new album with Guy Sigsworth would be released in 2012. However, in February 2012, Moyet wrote on Twitter: "I appear to have forfeited my recording deal because I won't do reality TV. No-one needs to make an album that badly. Tea anyone?" In a June 2012 interview with Touchbase Magazine, Moyet confirmed that she was still recording her album and that she was not rushing it, stating she could not envisage it being released before January 2013. When describing its sound and theme, Moyet said, "It's quite dark and definitely not aimed at the charts... it has an electronic bias, but isn't retro. I'm not listening to anything current or referring back to anything with this album and they [the songs] aren't influenced by what's going on. It will stand apart."

On 22 January 2013, it was announced via Moyet's official Facebook page that she had signed a worldwide deal with the London-based record label Cooking Vinyl. On 31 January 2013, it was revealed in a press release that the album was set to be released in May 2013.

On 18 February 2013, it was revealed via Facebook that the new album would be titled The Minutes along with one of its tracks "Changeling" made available as a free download via Moyet's newly relaunched website. The Minutes is described as "a unique collection of captivating songs that incorporate elements of high-end modern pop, club sounds, R&B and electronic experimentation."

"I avoided listening to anything during the process of writing and recording this album, choosing instead to be led by my own melodic voice, the one I now find myself with 30-years-in. Guy Sigsworth returns me to a programmer's world and marries it with perfect musicality. I have been waiting for him. We have made an album mindless of industry mores that apply to middle-aged women and have shunned all talk of audiences, demographics and advert jazz covers. This has easily been my happiest studio experience."

— Alison Moyet

=== Title ===
They were not years. They did not make us laugh always. We were not perpetually safe in love or thankful. Ours were not wads of hours tied up in a playful huddle. Never a summer eternal neither a winter we could skate upon. They were minutes. We have the minutes.

— Alison Moyet

In an interview with Graham Norton during his BBC Radio 2 show on 23 March 2013, Moyet explained the meaning behind the album's title: "Basically, we all feel slightly cheated when our life does not end up being this stream of joy and one thing that you do understand when you come middle aged is that it was never about that, it was always a lie, that it was always about fantastic minutes that are suspended in years, and that's what this is about... all the years of fighting to make a creative record for myself rather than do a covers album. These are my minutes."

In a May 2013 interview with The National, Moyet went on to reveal that she was inspired by the film, The Tree of Life. "Right at the end of the film there's this scene that lifts your spirits immeasurably. It summed up how I feel at the age of 51, which is that our lives are about brilliant little minutes suspended in years. But those minutes aren't necessarily very dramatic or specific, so I put the album title in small letters."

Moyet also states that she wrote the song "Filigree" after watching the 2011 film The Tree of Life and that that is where the reference to "the minutes" derives. "I went to see The Tree of Life, it was a rainy weekend afternoon, I was with my husband and it was sort of like we fell into a cinema. There was a line outside, the people were going in and obviously it's an art house film and these people were leaving in droves. These people looking for mainstream entertainment. You see them go. We sat there. We were caught by the visual beauty, perplexed by the seeming lack of narrative. But, either way you sit there for almost an hour and you find yourself involved in watching it and moving with the pace. At the same time, you still don't quite understand your experience. Then, in the last five minutes of the film is a wonderful, redemptive scene, which really kind of sums up what this album [The Minutes] means to me. It's like the whole chorus and you jump too soon and that can relate to suicide, that can relate to your relationship; a project that's become tortuous. Anything you fear and you're on your last legs and you jump right before this glorious redemptive minute."

"The one thing that you understand when you are middle-aged, is that this idea that you're sold on nursery stories when you're young is this "perfect" life and that somehow you f*cked up. You've got to continue on… and you fucked up. Then, you get to this brilliant place in your life where you are understood "Oh I see, those glorious times. They happened in pedestrian years. Those minutes were strong in pedestrian years.

And when I understand that, when I stop feeling cheated because of those dull, loveless, gray days and it's just these times that we're supposed to support. When you understand that, you're in the grade. You're ready for your own misery."

— Alison Moyet in Rage Monthly Magazine

In the June 2013 issue of Gay Times, Moyet revealed other considered titles: "Changeling" ("but Toyah had an album called Changeling"). "'Alison Moyet And The Man From,' ...because I wanted Guy in there somewhere. Because like I say this felt like a band album to me as opposed to a solo singer album. Because we worked together as a band, we didn't work together as a producer-client."

== Composition ==
The Minutes is a highly charged electronic, synth-pop-driven album with elements of R&B, pop rock and house. According to Moyet, "schizophrenia" is the theme of the album. Songs "Remind Yourself" and "When I Was Your Girl", Moyet states, are about "the opposing dialogues within oneself." "Rung by the Tide" resulted from researching the Middle Ages where "great swathes of the English coastline fell into the sea and priories and monasteries and their bell towers were lost." "Then I started to think about what it would feel like to be a bell. I thought, maybe the bell would be completely delighted about it. Maybe the bell thought: "All this time you've told me when I could sing and when I could stop, but now that's over."

== Singles ==
The first single "When I Was Your Girl" received its exclusive first play on Ken Bruce's BBC Radio 2 show on 19 March 2013. The music video for the single premiered the very same day via the UK web site Digital Spy. Moyet was accompanied by her real-life daughter in the video. The single's official release date was set for 1 April. It was performed at The Graham Norton Show on the BBC and on ITV1's This Morning. It featured on Radio 2's 'A' list and on other radio stations including "106.9FM WHCR" and "Kingstown Radio".

It was announced on 29 May 2013 that the second single taken from The Minutes would be "Love Reign Supreme". A music video for the single was shot at Moyet's Bush Hall show. The third single off the album "Changeling" was released on 14 October 2013.

== Promotion ==
=== "Tasters" ===
Aside from offering a free download of the track "Changeling" via her official web site, Moyet began release "tasters", short clips of each album track uploaded every Monday, Wednesday and Friday on a SoundCloud account throughout April 2013. Because an amateur shot live performance of the song "Rung by the Tide" from her Bush Hall gig failed to appear on YouTube, Moyet held off on releasing a clip of the eleventh and final track on the album.

=== Bush Hall gig ===
Moyet announced "Taking the Minutes", a one-off gig at London's Bush Hall to be held 18 April 2013 to launch the album. The gig was described as 'the single opportunity to hear every track of the album – live and in order – by the three people who made it.' Moyet is to be joined by co-producer Guy Sigsworth and Chris Elms. Fans were made aware of the possibility of a few Yazoo tracks, reworked by Sigsworth, making the set list. A live EP was released on 13 August 2014, Live at Bush Hall featuring the songs: "When I Was Your Girl," "Filigree," "Nobody's Diary," and "Don't Go."

=== Tour ===
On 25 February 2013, a tour was announced to promote the album. The Minutes Tour included dates in UK and Ireland from 30 September through 31 October 2013.

"Very glad to announce that I am heading back into tour central. Returning with my new album the minutes, shifted the bent and will see me returning to the stage with computers and screens and programming a go-go.

This tour, highlighting my new material, will take advantage of the altered line-up to approach again songs from Yazoo, my early solo synth years and Hometime, I reckon.

Ballads will be in short supply. Invisible, just that. Don't say I didn't tell you and do learn the words. Then we can have all-togetherness and the like and I can do that pointing thing and get you to sing and it will be brilliant and we shall laugh like drains except for in the grim bits. Naturally there will be grim happening at some point. I am Alison Moyet, be fair. Then, when the grim is over we can do some idiot dancing and get all loved up on it. Sounds like a top plan xxx"

— Alison Moyet

== Critical reception ==
Professional ratings
Aggregate scores
Source	Rating
Metacritic	73/100
Review scores
Source	Rating
AllMusic	4/5 stars
Clash	7/10
The Daily Express	4/5
Digital Spy	5/5 stars
eMusic	4.5/5 stars
Liverpool Sound and Vision	4/5 stars
Orlando Weekly	5/5 stars
PopMatters	7/10
Q	4/5 stars
The Yorkshire Times	4.5/5

The Minutes received generally positive reviews from music critics. At Metacritic, which assigns a normalised rating out of 100 to reviews from mainstream publications, the album received an average score of 73, based on 7 reviews. Stephen Unwin of the Daily Express described the album as "brilliant" and "cinematic, energetic and sitting as prettily today as it might have 25 years ago, the minutes is stirring and beautiful," referring to the album's sound being a return to her early electronic and sythnpop days. Lewis Corner of Digital Spy also echoed the Daily Express' critique of the album being a return to Moyet's earlier but added that the album's sound moved into "new territory." John Freeman of Clash hailed the album Moyet's "finest album in twenty years." Paul Connolly of eMusic dubbed The Minutes "her best album, by a considerable margin." Jeremy Williams of The Yorkshire Times referred to Moyet's work with producer Guy Sigsworth as "essentially a rather captivating meeting of two creative minds, who together have crafted a near perfect contemporary masterpiece that could soon be hailed a classic."

John Aizlewood of Q magazine viewed Sigsworth as Moyet's "musical soulmate" and said of The Minutes: "this is her best LP in decades." Ian D. Hall of Liverpool Sound and Vision described the album as "...going back to the house you were born in and seeing that it has irrevocably changed but has all the old pleasant memories running around its corridors." Charles Pitter of PopMatters referred to Moyet as versatile, and that her music can "appeal to hipsters and housewives, or even housewives in hipsters, and the minutes is a great type of hybrid." In the United States, Billy Manes of Orlando Weekly called The Minutes a "triumph" and that the album "towers above almost everything before it in the Moyet oeuvre."

== Track listing ==
No.	Title	Writer(s)	Length
1.	"Horizon Flame"	Alison Moyet, Guy Sigsworth	3:39
2.	"Changeling"	Moyet, Sigsworth	2:57
3.	"When I Was Your Girl"	Moyet, Sigsworth	3:39
4.	"Apple Kisses"	Moyet, Sigsworth	3:32
5.	"Right as Rain"	Moyet, Sigsworth, Andy Page	3:07
6.	"Remind Yourself"	Moyet, Sigsworth, Cass Lowe	3:48
7.	"Love Reign Supreme"	Moyet, Sigsworth, Lowe	3:45
8.	"A Place to Stay"	Moyet, Sigsworth	4:03
9.	"Filigree"	Moyet, Sigsworth	3:44
10.	"All Signs of Life"	Moyet, Sigsworth	3:54
11.	"Rung by the Tide"	Moyet, Sigsworth	4:35
Total length:			40:43

iTunes Store bonus track
No.	Title	Writer(s)	Length
12.	"Filigree" (West Coast Mix)	Moyet, Sigsworth	3:43
Total length:			44:27

Deluxe Edition (2026) – Disc 1
No.	Title	Writer(s)	Length
12.	"Changeing" (Guy Sigsworth Remix)	Moyet, Sigsworth	3:58
13.	"Right as Rain" (Guy Sigsworth Remix)	Moyet, Sigsworth, Page	3:19
14.	"When I Was Your Girl" (Live at Bush Hall)	Moyet, Sigsworth	3:51
15.	"Filigree" (Live at Bush Hall)	Moyet, Sigsworth	4:28
16.	"Nobody's Diary" (Live at Bush Hall)	Moyet	4:38
17.	"Don't Go" (Live at Bush Hall)	Vince Clarke	4:18

Deluxe Edition (2026) – Disc 2
No.	Title	Writer(s)	Length
1.	"Horizon Flame" (Live)	Moyet, Sigsworth	3:55
2.	"When I Was Your Girl" (Live)	Moyet, Sigsworth	3:52
3.	"Ordnary Girl" (Live)	Moyet, Joss Bailey, Rick Driscoll	3:35
4.	"Remind Yourself" (Live)	Moyet, Sigsworth, Lowe	3:57
5.	"Is This Love?" (Live)	Moyet, Jean Guiot	3:54
6.	"Winter Kills" (Live)	Moyet	6:55
7.	"Filigree" (Live)	Moyet, Sigsworth	3:48
8.	"Only You" (Live)	Clarke	3:06
9.	"Changeling" (Live)	Moyet, Sigsworth	3:22
10.	"This House" (Live)	Moyet	3:54
11.	"All Signs of Life" (Live)	Moyet, Sigsworth	4:01
12.	"All Cried Out" (Live)	Moyet, Steve Jolley, Tony Swain	4:55
13.	"Situation" (Live)	Moyet, Clarke	4:02

== Personnel ==
Credits adapted from the liner notes of The Minutes.

- Alison Moyet – vocals
- Tim Debney – mastering
- Chris Elms – engineering, programming, sound design (all tracks); mixing (all tracks except "A Place to Stay")
- Tom Martin – photography
- Andy Page – mixing ("Right as Rain", "A Place to Stay"); programming, sound design ("A Place to Stay")
- Guy Sigsworth – keyboards, production, synthesisers, samples
- Rebecca Strickson – artwork, design

== Charts ==
Chart performance for The Minutes
Chart (2013)	Peak position
Belgian Albums (Ultratop Flanders)	172
Dutch Albums (Album Top 100)	83
Irish Albums (IRMA)	43
Irish Independent Albums (IRMA)	7
Scottish Albums (Official Charts)	7
UK Albums (Official Charts)	5
UK Independent Albums (Official Charts)	2

== Release history ==
Release dates and formats for The Minutes
Region	Date	Format(s)	Label	Ref.
Germany	3 May 2013	Digital download	Cooking Vinyl	
United Kingdom	6 May 2013	CD; digital download	Cooking Vinyl	
Germany	10 May 2013	CD	Cooking Vinyl	
United Kingdom	3 June 2013	LP	Demon	
United States	11 June 2013	CD; digital download	Metropolis	
