= Solid Wood =

1995 single by Alison Moyet

- UK CD1 artwork

Single by Alison Moyet

from the album Singles
- B-side: "Blue"
- Released: 14 August 1995
- Genre: Pop; rock
- Length: 4:37
- Label: Columbia
- Songwriter: Alison Moyet
- Producer: Ian Broudie

Alison Moyet singles chronology
"The First Time Ever I Saw Your Face" (1995)	"Solid Wood" (1995)	"Should I Feel That It's Over" (2002)

"Solid Wood" is a song by British singer-songwriter Alison Moyet, released on 14 August 1995 as the second and final single from her 1995 compilation album Singles. It was written by Moyet and produced by Ian Broudie.

== Background ==
In May 1995, Columbia released Alison Moyet's first compilation album, Singles, which reached the UK number one spot the following month. To promote the album, two newly-recorded tracks, "The First Time Ever I Saw Your Face" and "Solid Wood" were released as singles. "Solid Wood" was the second, released on 14 August 1995. Unlike "The First Time Ever I Saw Your Face", which did not chart, "Solid Wood" reached No. 44 in the United Kingdom, remaining in the top 100 for two weeks.

A music video was filmed to promote the single. In the States, it gained some airing on the music television show JBTV, the Brockton-based Rage TV, and Newark-based Power Play Music Video Television.

== Release ==
"Solid Wood" was released by Columbia on CD and cassette in the UK and across Europe. The B-side on the cassette edition was "Blue", a non-album track which was written about Moyet's love of Southend United F.C. In the UK, two different CD versions were released, with CD1 also featuring the same tracks as the main European release. In addition to "Blue", "Ode to Boy", taken from the Essex album, was included, along with a live version of "There Are Worse Things I Could Do". The sleeve of the CD1 release features a photograph of Moyet's parents on a motorbike. For the UK CD2 version, the third and fourth tracks were "Whispering Your Name", also from Essex, and "First Time (Are You Sure It's Your......)", a remix of "The First Time Ever I Saw Your Face" by Mark Saunders.

== Critical reception ==
On its release, Music & Media described "Solid Wood" as "a solid rocking pop song" which "do[es] justice to her background in Canvey Island where pub rock once started".

== Track listings ==
UK CD1

1. "Solid Wood" – 4:23
2. "Blue" – 3:22
3. "Ode to Boy" – 2:54
4. "There Are Worst Things I Could Do" (recorded live) – 2:29

UK CD2

1. "Solid Wood" – 4:23
2. "Blue" – 3:22
3. "Whispering Your Name" – 3:29
4. "First Time (Are You Sure It's Your...)" – 4:11

UK cassette single

1. "Solid Wood" – 4:22
2. "Blue" – 3:21

European CD single

1. "Solid Wood" – 4:23
2. "Blue" – 3:22
3. "Ode to Boy" – 2:54
4. "There Are Worst Things I Could Do" (recorded live) – 2:29

== Personnel ==
Production

- Ian Broudie – producer on "Solid Wood" and "Whispering Your Name", mixing on "Whispering Your Name"
- Bob Kraushaar – mixing on "Solid Wood"
- Pete Glenister – producer on "Blue", "Ode to Boy", "First Time (Are You Sure It's Your...)" and "There Are Worst Things I Could Do", mixing on "Blue"
- Vic Van Vugt – mixing on "Blue", engineer on "Blue" and "Ode to Boy"
- Alan Winstanley – mixing on "Ode to Boy"
- Neil Brockbank – engineer on "Ode to Boy" and "There Are Worst Things I Could Do"
- Mark Saunders – producer and mixing on "First Time (Are You Sure It's Your...)"

Others

- The Douglas Brothers – photography
- Alison Moyet, Martin Jenkins – design

== Charts ==
Chart (1995)	Peak position
UK Singles (OCC)	44
