= Reassuring Pinches =

Song by Alison Moyet

Single by Alison Moyet

from the album Other
- Released: 30 April 2017
- Genre: Synthpop
- Length: 4:01
- Label: Cooking Vinyl
- Songwriters: Alison Moyet; Guy Sigsworth; John Garden; Sean McGhee
- Producer: Guy Sigsworth

Alison Moyet singles chronology
"Changeling" (2013)	"Reassuring Pinches" (2017)	"The Rarest Birds" (2017)

Music video
- "Reassuring Pinches" on YouTube

"Reassuring Pinches" is a song by English singer-songwriter Alison Moyet, released as the first single from her ninth studio album, Other (2017).

Moyet announced "Reassuring Pinches" as the first single off Other and premiered the radio edit of the song on Graham Norton's BBC Radio 2 show on 29 April 2017. The song marks the first of two collaborations on Other between bandmates Sean McGhee and John Garden who joined Moyet on her 2013-2014 tour, The Minutes and Seconds. The lyric video for the single debuted on 30 April via Moyet's YouTube account. The music video for the single directed by Steve Gullick was released on 10 May 2017.

== Critical reception ==
In a review of Other, Fortitude magazine described the song as "a sinister creature with a glitching heartbeat that is shaped by brooding synth arpeggios", also noting Moyet's "robust vocal performance" and Sigsworth's "intricate precision and dynamic musicality". Louder Than War stated: ""Reassuring Pinches" has a cold almost freezing feel surrounded in chilling triads and some nearly out of control synth squeaks and screeches. It almost sees [Moyet] experimenting bizarre and unconventional sounds pitted against her sublime enunciation."

musicOMH noted the song's "brooding electro production" and "idiosyncratic lyrics". SLUG Magazine wrote: "After an epic build-up, wild electronica punctuates "Reassuring Pinches" menacingly. The metaphorical, lyrical predator-hunting-its-prey is matched by an expressive vocal performance that is atmospheric and alluring." theMusic.com.au picked the song as the best on the album, describing it as a "Vangelis-like intimidation". Record Collector made comparisons to the "chilly electro-drama" of the song to the sound of Yazoo.

== Track listing ==
1. "Reassuring Pinches" — 4:01
2. "Reassuring Pinches" (Alternative Radio Mix) — 3:08
