= For You Only =

Single by Alison Moyet

from the album Alf
- B-side: "Twisting the Knife" (Europe); "Money Mile" (America)
- Released: October 1985
- Genre: Pop
- Length: 3:52
- Label: CBS Records
- Songwriters: Alison Moyet; Steve Jolley; Tony Swain
- Producers: Steve Jolley; Tony Swain

Alison Moyet singles chronology
"That Ole Devil Called Love" (1985)	"For You Only" (1985)	"Is This Love?" (1986)

"For You Only" is a song by British singer-songwriter Alison Moyet, which was released in 1985 as the fourth and final single from her debut studio album Alf. For its release as a single, a remixed version of the song was created, which was named the "New Version". The song written by Moyet, Steve Jolley and Tony Swain, and produced by Jolley and Swain.

Originally, when CBS suggested releasing a fourth single from Alf, Moyet spoke against the idea and suggested she record a cover of "That Ole Devil Called Love" in order to give fans something new. Her version of the song was released in March 1985, becoming a big hit, including in the UK where it reached No. 2. After this, CBS later decided to release "For You Only" as a single in Europe and America. For its release as a single, "For You Only" was remixed and partially re-recorded to create a new version. The song was a success in Germany, peaking at No. 7 in late 1985. The song was also an airplay hit in New Zealand.

A music video was created to promote the single, featuring shots of Moyet sitting at an empty bar and walking the street outside. Moyet also performed the song for Dutch TV at the Platengala Nationaal and on the German Peter's Pop Show.

== Release ==
The single was released by CBS on 7" and 12" vinyl in Europe and America. In Europe, the B-Side was "Twisting the Knife", while in America "Money Mile" was used, both of which were taken from Alf. For the European 12" vinyl edition of the single, an "Extended New Version" of the A-Side was featured. Later in 1989, "For You Only" was released in the Netherlands as a 3-inch CD greeting card, with "Love Resurrection" as the B-Side.

== Critical reception ==
In a contemporary review of Alf, Rolling Stone commented: "Even when she verges on melodrama – and on "For You Only" she reaches it – Moyet shows no shame. She rocks back on her heels and lets fly." Writing for Pop Rescue, Andrew Martin described the song as "somewhat downbeat and a little sad" and commented on Moyet's "soulful" vocals.

== Formats ==
7" single (European release)

1. "For You Only (New Version)" – 3:52
2. "Twisting the Knife" – 3:25

12" single (European release)

1. "For You Only (Extended New Version)" – 6:14
2. "Twisting the Knife" – 3:25

7" single (US release)

1. "For You Only" – 3:57
2. "Money Mile" – 3:43

7" single (US promo release)

1. "For You Only" – 3:57
2. "For You Only" – 3:57

12" single (US promo release)

1. "For You Only" – 3:57
2. "For You Only" – 3:57

CD single (Netherlands 1989 release)

1. "For You Only" – 4:08
2. "Love Resurrection" – 3:51

== Chart performance ==
Chart (1985)	Peak position
German Singles Chart	7

== Personnel ==
- Alison Moyet – vocals
- Tony Swain – keyboards, producer
- Steve Jolley – producer
- Tim Goldsmith – drums
- Richard Lengyel – recording engineer
- Roger Dobson – assistant engineer
