= The Rarest Birds =

Single by Alison Moyet

from the album Other
- Released: 4 June 2017
- Genre: Synthpop
- Length: 4:37
- Label: Cooking Vinyl
- Songwriters: Alison Moyet; John Garden; Sean McGhee
- Producer: Guy Sigsworth

Alison Moyet singles chronology
"Reassuring Pinches" (2017)	"The Rarest Birds" (2017)

Music video
- "The Rarest Birds" on YouTube

"The Rarest Birds" is a song by the British singer-songwriter Alison Moyet, released in 2017 as the second single from her ninth studio album Other. It was written by Moyet, John Garden and Sean McGhee, and produced by Guy Sigsworth.

== Background ==
"The Rarest Birds" followed "Reassuring Pinches" as the second single from Other. The track debuted on Graham Norton's BBC Radio 2 show on 3 June 2017 and released the following day as a digital download. A music video for the song premiered on 20 July. Directed by Steve Gullick, the video was shot in Brighton and features Moyet's daughter Caitlin Ballard. In addition to the video, Moyet also performed the song on live on The Graham Norton Show.

Speaking of the song, Moyet said it is a "paean to LGBTQ, to Brighton, to coming out after the darkest nights into the arms of those that delight in your flight". She further revealed to the music webzine Drowned in Sound that the song "celebrates a place where a person can be who they were meant to be. It celebrates solidarity when it comes to individualism. It holds hands and calls time on silence, stillness, fear. It celebrates beautiful girls born boys. Stronger boys for being born girls. Freedom to identify where best we fit."

== Critical reception ==
In a review of Other, Maxie Molotov-Smith of Fortitude magazine described "The Rarest Birds" as the "torch song of Other" and "possibly her best ballad to date". They added that the song was a "beaming ode to solidarity and identity, beginning with a smouldering glimmer before bursting into a beautiful aurora borealis in the chorus." Record Collector commented of the song's "dense strings underpinning a gorgeous, panoramic melody". SLUG Magazine wrote: "The poetry of "The Rarest Birds" reminds one of what a thoughtful lyricist Moyet has become over the years."

Aaron Badgley of The Spill Magazine felt the song was "current", yet "brings to mind the torch songs of the '60s, with beautiful orchestration and arrangements". The writer also believed the song featured one of Moyet's "strongest ever vocal performances". The Music stated: ""The Rarest Birds" could have been plucked from her early '90s powerful soul-rock peak". Albumism picked the song as one of four "notable tracks" from the album, noting the song "celebrates the humanity of diversity". The American newspaper Seattle Post-Intelligencer commented on the song's "pastoral melodies and epic chorus".

== Track listing ==
1. "The Rarest Birds" – 4:37

== Personnel ==
- Alison Moyet – vocals
- Guy Sigsworth – strings, synthesisers, piano, harpsichord, guitar, bass, sound design, producer
- Chris Elms – programming, mixing, engineering
- Jake Miller – programming, engineering
- Tim Debney – mastering at Fluid Mastering
