= It Won't Be Long (Alison Moyet song) =

1991 single by Alison Moyet

Single by Alison Moyet

from the album Hoodoo
- B-side: "My Right A.R.M."
- Released: 25 March 1991
- Genre: Pop
- Length: 3:56
- Label: Columbia
- Songwriters: Alison Moyet; Pete Glenister
- Producer: Pete Glenister

Alison Moyet singles chronology
"Love Letters" (1987)	"It Won't Be Long" (1991)	"Wishing You Were Here" (1991)

"It Won't Be Long" is a song by British singer-songwriter Alison Moyet, which was released in March 1991 by Columbia Records as the lead single from her third studio album, Hoodoo (1991). It was written by Moyet and Pete Glenister, and produced by Glenister. A music video was filmed to promote the single, while Moyet also performed the song on Wogan.

== Background ==
After recording her second studio album Raindancing while living in Los Angeles, Moyet returned to live in England after completing a world tour. Moyet's record company, CBS, wanted her to continue producing pop hits but this left the singer feeling artistically compromised and under pressure to deliver. During the period after returning to England, Moyet began a songwriting partnership with Pete Glenister, who had been Moyet's guitarist for part of the Raindancing tour. Keen to have more artistic freedom, she suggested to CBS that Glenister should produce her. Muff Winwood of the label's A&R division granted Moyet permission to record the album she wanted to, with Hoodoo being released in April 1991.

Preceding the album in March was the lead single "It Won't Be Long". Although it gained airplay on radio, "It Won't Be Long" failed to enter the UK Top 40, reaching No. 50. It remained in the Top 100 for four weeks. In the States, it reached No. 29 on the Billboard Modern Rock Tracks Chart. Despite its limited commercial success, the song saw Moyet awarded a Grammy nomination for Best Female Rock Vocal Performance in 1993.

In a 1991 interview with the Liverpool Echo, Moyet described "It Won't Be Long" as "basically a song about getting older". She added: "When you're young, you can go into things with an open mind. As you get older and experience all sorts of situations, you pick up all sorts of emotional luggage that you carry with you." On her official website, she has cited the song as one of her favourites from Hoodoo.

== Release ==
"It Won't Be Long" was released by Columbia on 7-inch vinyl, 12-inch vinyl, cassette and CD. It was released in the UK and across Europe, as well as Australia. In the States, it was released as a promotional CD single only. The 7-inch vinyl's B-side, "My Right A.R.M.", was taken from the Hoodoo album. The "A.R.M" in the song's title resembles the initials of Moyet's oldest daughter. A second B-side, "Take of Me", appeared on the 12-inch vinyl and CD versions of the single. The song was later included as an album track on Moyet's 1994 album Essex.

== Critical reception ==
Upon its release as a single, Chesney Hawkes, guest reviewing for Smash Hits, commented, "This sounds exactly like a Beatles' tune, doesn't it? I don't think it'll be a hit. I really liked her version of 'Love Letters', but this isn't very good at all." Tonia Macari of Aberdeen Evening Express noted, "It sounds like Moyet has spent her last four years polishing up her Dusty impersonations as 'It Won't Be Long' lends a lot to the mood of the white-lipsticked Sixties."

Pan-European magazine Music & Media commented, "Not exactly what you would expect from her. This is not the new 'Ol' Devil Called Love'. No easy-listening here, this song is something completely different, with guitars dominating the uptempo song. Don't bother with it if you can't discover the hidden charms of the composition. It won't be long, it's only a single." Stuart Maconie from NME wrote, "This really is pretty fab. Very 1991 but not embarrasingly so, The Cocteau Twins, Curve and The Beatles' 'Baby, You're a Rich Man' are tossed into the wok and fried up with a little oil and spices. This is the last thing we expected. We like surprises."

In the US, Billboard magazine said, "Why Moyet is not yet a major star in the U.S. remains a mystery – especially given modern pop gems like this one from her overlooked Hoodoo set. EMF/Jesus Jones-like hip-hop beats are complemented by jangly guitars, a funk-flavored bass line, and Moyet's incomparable vocals. Radio programmers, please take note."

In a review of Hoodoo, Rolling Stone noted the song's "melodic momentum". The Greyhound (Loyola University Maryland) described the song as "Beatlesque pop". Tom Demalon of AllMusic retrospectively stated, "Moyet hasn't lost her knack for breezy, adult pop, evident on the lilting, melodic 'Wishing You Were Here' and 'It Won't Be Long'." Adrian Janes of Penny Black Music noted that the guitar motif of "It Won't Be Long" evokes The Beatles.

== Formats ==
- 7-inch single
1. "It Won't Be Long" - 3:56
2. "My Right A.R.M." - 4:45
- 12-inch single
1. "It Won't Be Long" - 4:22
2. "My Right A.R.M." - 4:45
3. "Take of Me" - 4:00
- Cassette single
1. "It Won't Be Long" - 3:56
2. "My Right A.R.M." - 4:45
- CD single
1. "It Won't Be Long" - 4:22
2. "My Right A.R.M." - 4:45
3. "Take of Me" - 4:00
- CD single (European mini-single)
1. "It Won't Be Long" - 3:56
2. "My Right A.R.M." - 4:45
- CD single (US promo)
1. "It Won't Be Long" (Edit) - 3:43
2. "It Won't Be Long" (Album Version) - 4:14

== Personnel ==
- Alison Moyet – lead vocals, backing vocals, backing vocal arrangement
- Pete Glenister – guitar on "It Won't Be Long" and "My Right A.R.M."
- Bob Andrews – keyboards on "It Won't Be Long"
- John McKenzie – bass on "It Won't Be Long"
- Blair Cunningham – drums on "It Won't Be Long"
- Steve Sidelnyk – percussion
- Simon Fowler, Steve Cradock – backing vocals on "It Won't Be Long"

Production

- Pete Glenister – producer, programming on "My Right A.R.M."
- Steve Lillywhite – mixing on "It Won't Be Long"
- Neil Brockbank – engineer on "It Won't Be Long" and "Take of Me", additional engineer on "My Right A.R.M."
- Alison Moyet – programming on "My Right A.R.M."
- Phil Legg – engineering, mixing and programming on "My Right A.R.M.", mixing on "Take of Me"

Other

- Juergen Teller – photography
- DKB – design

== Charts ==
Chart (1991)	Peak position
Australia (ARIA)	153
Luxembourg (Radio Luxembourg)	8
Netherlands (Single Top 100)	43
Netherlands (Tipparade)	5
UK Singles (OCC)	50
UK Airplay (Music Week)	23
US Modern Rock Tracks (Billboard)	29
