= Joe Duddell =

- Born: 26 July 1972 (age 54)
- Origin: United Kingdom
- Occupations: Composer; musician; conductor

Joe Duddell (born 26 July 1972) is a composer, musician and conductor from Manchester, UK. He studied Music at Salford University, followed by advanced Composition studies under Steve Martland at the Royal Academy of Music. During this formative period, he secured his first BBC commission and signed a publishing deal with Schott Music.

Duddell’s compositions have been widely performed at prestigious festivals and venues around the world. He received three BBC Proms commissions: Vaporize, Ode to English, a nd the percussion concerto Ruby for Colin Currie. In addition to his Proms successes, Duddell has served as Composer-in-Residence at both the Presteigne and Lichfield Festivals.

In 2009, Duddell’s career took a significant turn when he was asked to orchestrate and conduct the band Elbow with the Hallé Orchestra for the Manchester International Festival. The concerts at the Bridgewater Hall were met with unprecedented critical acclaim, highlighting Duddell’s ability to bridge the worlds of classical and popular music seamlessly.

Beyond this landmark project, Duddell has composed, arranged and conducted many projects for an array of well-known orchestras, including the BBC Philharmonic, Manchester Camerata, London Symphony Orchestra, Australian Chamber Orchestra, BBC Concert Orchestra, Orchestra of the Swan, and the Ulster Orchestra. He has worked with artists such as New Order, James, Steve Mason, Daughter, Alison Moyet, Starsailor, Nero, Everything Everything, Rae Morris, Active Child, Gaz Coombes, Richard Hawley and Clean Bandit.

He was Composer-in-residence at Festival No.6 for 7 years where he worked with over 40 artists including the poet Mike Garry who he went on to write ‘Ode to St Anthony’ with. Joe has also been commissioned several times by the Manchester International Festival and the fashion brand Burberry. In 2023 he co-curated the BBC Northern Soul Prom at the Royal Albert Hall which has gone on to become the most watched Prom on the BBC iPlayer.
