= Invisible (Alison Moyet song) =

1984 single by Alison Moyet

Single by Alison Moyet

from the album Alf
- B-side: "Hitch Hike"
- Released: 19 November 1984
- Recorded: 1984
- Genre: Pop; blue-eyed soul
- Length: 4:00
- Label: Columbia
- Songwriter: Lamont Dozier
- Producer: Steve Jolley & Tony Swain

Alison Moyet singles chronology
"All Cried Out" (1984)	"Invisible" (1984)	"That Ole Devil Called Love" (1985)

Music video
- "Invisible" on YouTube

"Invisible" is a song by English singer Alison Moyet, written by Lamont Dozier (of the songwriting team Holland–Dozier–Holland) for her debut album, Alf. Released on 19 November 1984, "Invisible" peaked at No. 21 on the UK Singles Chart and became Moyet's highest-charting solo single (as well as her only top-40 hit) in the United States, peaking at No. 31 on the Billboard Hot 100. The song reached the top 10 in Ireland and New Zealand, peaking at No. 6 and No. 4, respectively. The single's B-side is the Marvin Gaye song "Hitch Hike", which has backing from Darts.

In interviews for her 2017 tour, Moyet said she would not be performing the song again. She explained that it was not a slam against the song itself (or any fans who enjoyed the song), but that the lyrics and message of the song, written more than 30 years earlier, did not resonate with her any more.

== Critical reception ==
Upon its release as a single, Andy Strike of Record Mirror commented, "My favourite track from Alf and a great single. Alison pushes 'Invisible' along effortlessly and sounds great. Obviously a hit and quite rightly so. Love it!" Richard Bryson of the Suffolk & Essex Free Press noted, "To some, Alison Moyet has lost her edge since Yazoo but her strident version of this Lamont Dozier song certainly does not lack class or style."

Lesley White of Smash Hits concluded, "As pop ballads go this one is quite acceptable - catchy, even - and that voice is in fine form but it lacks a certain edge." Tibet of Sounds summarised, "Not a bad record, with all the ingredients you'd expect: glossy sleeve, glossy production, glossy presentation, glossy product." Phil McNeill of Number One wrote, "'Invisible' is a turgid song brought to life by Alison's brilliance. When someone writes Alison Moyet a song as good as 'I Just Don't Know What to Do with Myself' or 'You Don't Have to Say You Love Me', we'll feel the earth move."

In the US, Cash Box listed the song as a "feature pick" during March 1985 and wrote, "Moyet has power and stylish phrasing which shines on this broken heart ballad. Pure pop potential with a world of songwriting integrity." C.A. Fredrick of the Muscatine Journal described "Invisible" as a "marvelous lost-love song that is already in the running for best single of 1985". Rick Shefchik of The Dispatch considered the song "the toughest piece of music on the charts since Tina Turner's "Better Be Good to Me"."

== Music videos ==
There are two versions of the music video for the song. In the first version, Moyet is seen at a party surrounded by friends, all of whom appear to have partners of various forms. She walks into another room to perform the song. Moyet is often seen singing alone outside, or in what appears to be a cupboard. There are also many cutaways to where Moyet walks through the party unnoticed (hence, she is invisible). The video ends with her drinking a glass of wine and lost in thought. The second version of the video mostly features Moyet performing the song and omits many of the party scenes. It concludes with Moyet walking out of the room and into a white light. In both videos, there are moments when the camera pans on what seems to be a silver rhombus with the letter 'i' in the middle.

== Track listings ==
7-inch single

1. "Invisible" – 3:56
2. "Hitch Hike" – 2:38

12-inch single 1

1. "Invisible" (extended version) – 6:05
2. "Hitch Hike" – 2:38

12-inch single 2

1. "Invisible" (The Transparent mix) – 6:31
2. "Hitch Hike" – 2:38

Cassette single (Australian release)

1. "Invisible" – 3:56
2. "Invisible" (extended version) – 6:05
3. "Invisible" (The Transparent mix) – 6:31
4. "Hitch Hike" – 2:38

== Charts ==
=== Weekly charts ===
Chart (1985)	Peak position
Australia (Kent Music Report)	15
Belgium (Ultratop 50 Flanders)	34
Canada Top Singles (RPM)	14
Canada Adult Contemporary (RPM)	5
Europe (European Hot 100 Singles)	57
Ireland (IRMA)	6
New Zealand (Recorded Music NZ)	4
Paraguay	2
Sweden (Sverigetopplistan)	18
Switzerland (Schweizer Hitparade)	25
UK Singles (Official Charts)	21
US Billboard Hot 100	31
West Germany (GfK)	22

=== Year-end charts ===
Chart (1985)	Position
Canada Top Singles (RPM)	91
