= Alison Moyet =

English singer (born 1961)

Alison Moyet MBE
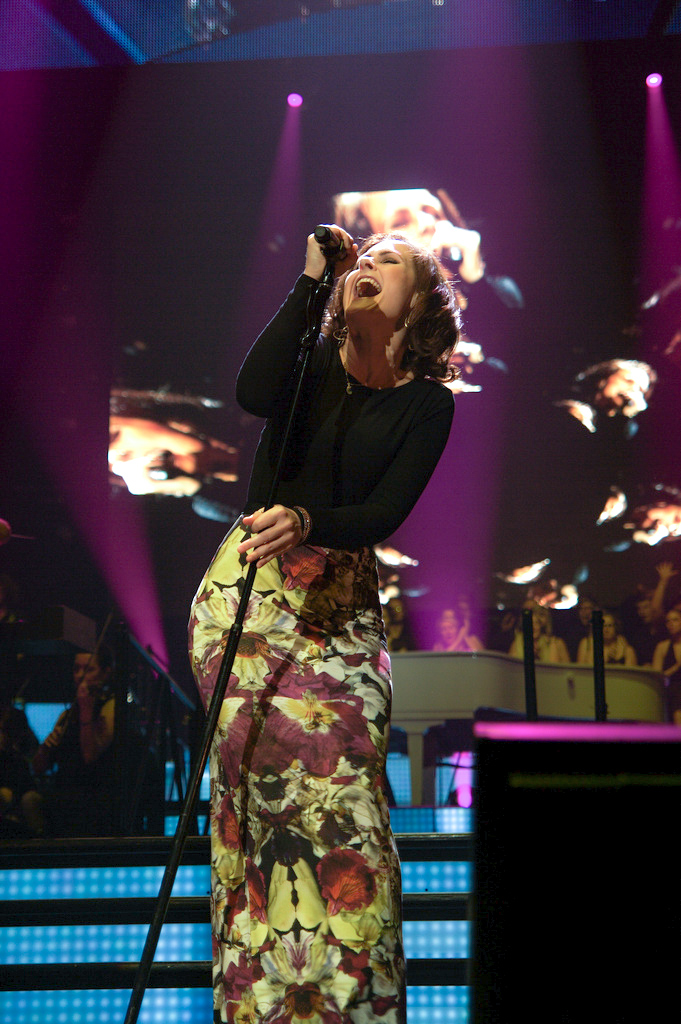
- Moyet performing in Hanover, Germany, in 2011
- Born: Geneviève Alison Jane Moyet; 18 June 1961 (age 65); Basildon, Essex, England
- Other name: Alf
- Occupations: Singer; songwriter
- Years active: 1981–present
- Works: Discography
- Musical career
- Genres: Synth-pop; new wave; R&B; soul; pop rock; jazz
- Labels: Cooking Vinyl; Columbia; Sanctuary; W14 Music; Sony Music; Mute
- Formerly of: The Vandals; the Screamin' Ab Dabs; the Vicars; the Little Roosters; Yazoo
- Website: alisonmoyetmusic.com

Geneviève Alison Jane Moyet ( /ˈmɔɪ.eɪ/ MOY-ay; born 18 June 1961), formerly known as Alf, is an English singer-songwriter. Noted for her powerful bluesy contralto voice, she came to prominence as a member of the synth-pop duo Yazoo (known as Yaz in North America), but has since mainly worked as a solo artist.

By June 2023, her worldwide album sales had reached a certified 23 million, with over two million singles sold. Highlighting a career that has achieved a top 10 UK album across 5 different decades, all of Moyet's ten studio albums and three compilation albums have charted in the top 30 of the UK Albums Chart, (with two of them reaching number one), and she has had several top-10 hits on the UK singles chart.

== Early life and education ==
Geneviève Alison Jane Moyet was born on 18 June 1961 in Basildon, Essex, to a French father and English mother. She did not grow up bilingual, but spoke "Franglais", and was called Alison from a young age.

She grew up in Basildon, where she attended Janet Duke Junior School and then Nicholas Comprehensive at secondary level, where she was in the same class as Andrew Fletcher and Martin Gore who later founded Depeche Mode.

She was involved in a number of punk rock, pub rock, and blues bands in the southeast Essex area during the late 1970s and early 1980s, including the Vandals, the Screamin' Ab Dabs, the Vicars, and the Little Roosters. After leaving school when she was 16, Moyet worked as a shop assistant and trained as a piano tuner.

== Music career ==
At the age of 20, Moyet's mainstream pop career began in 1982 with the formation of the synth-pop duo Yazoo with former Depeche Mode member Vince Clarke. In the United States, the band operated under the name Yaz, due to trademark issues with the Yazoo Records record label already operating in the region. Yazoo had several hits, including "Only You", "Don't Go", "Situation" and "Nobody's Diary", and recorded two albums, Upstairs at Eric's and You and Me Both.

In 1983, Clarke decided to disband Yazoo. While he went on to form The Assembly (another duo, this time with Eric Radcliffe) and then Erasure (a duo again, with Andy Bell), Moyet signed to CBS, and began her solo career. In 1984, Moyet released her debut solo album Alf (titled after her punk-era nickname). Alf was produced by the record-producing and songwriting team of Jolley & Swain. The album was co-written by the duo and Moyet, with the exception of "Invisible", which was written for Moyet by Lamont Dozier. The record was a hit in Britain, reaching No. 1 in the UK Albums Chart. Alf spawned three international hit singles, "Love Resurrection" (UK No. 10), "Invisible" (UK No. 21) and "All Cried Out" (UK No. 8). In some European territories, a fourth single, "For You Only", was also released. In the US, "Invisible" was a Top 40 hit; Moyet has stated in several interviews over the years that she can no longer relate to the song and will no longer perform it live.

In 1985, Moyet performed at Live Aid alongside Paul Young and later returned unscheduled to the stage (alongside Bob Geldof, David Bowie and Pete Townshend) to provide vocals on "Let It Be" when Paul McCartney's vocal microphone at his piano failed, leaving him unable to be heard for the first stanza of the song. (Twenty years later, he overdubbed his vocal for the Live Aid DVD release.) Moyet also released a single not featured on Alf, a cover of the standard "That Ole Devil Called Love", which climbed to No. 2 on the UK singles chart (it remains Moyet's highest-charting UK single).

Moyet had another big UK hit the following year with "Is This Love?" (co-written by Eurythmics' Dave Stewart, under the pseudonym Jean Guiot), followed in 1987 by her second LP, Raindancing. Raindancing spawned further hit singles, including a cover of Floy Joy's "Weak in the Presence of Beauty" and "Ordinary Girl". In 1987, she scored another cover hit with "Love Letters", which peaked at UK No. 4. The video for the song featured comedy duo French and Saunders.

=== 1990s: Further recordings and hiatus ===
Following a period of personal and career evaluation, she released Hoodoo in 1991. The album sold respectably in the UK, and Moyet was nominated for a Grammy for the single "It Won't Be Long". However, the release of Hoodoo marked the beginning of an eight-year fight for Moyet to secure complete control of her artistic direction. Like many similar artists (including Aimee Mann and the late Kirsty MacColl), Moyet was reluctant to record a radio-friendly "pop" album simply for the sake of creating chart hits.

Moyet's next album, Essex (1994), was also a source of controversy for her; in order for the album to be released, her label (now Sony) insisted that certain Essex tracks be re-recorded and re-produced, and that there be additional material remixed to create a more "commercial" package. The video for the single "Whispering Your Name" again featured Dawn French.

Following the release of Essex, Sony released a greatest hits compilation of Moyet's work. Singles entered the UK Albums Chart at No. 1 and, following a UK tour, was re-issued as a double CD set which included Live (No Overdubs), a bonus live CD. Upon re-issue, Singles charted again, this time in the Top 20.

Due to prolonged litigation with Sony, Moyet did not record or release a new studio album for over eight years after the release of Essex. During this time, however, she recorded vocals for Tricky, Sylk-130, Ocean Colour Scene, The Lightning Seeds, and King Britt, and was featured on the British leg of the Lilith Fair tour. 2001 saw the release of The Essential Alison Moyet CD, and in 2002 The Essential Alison Moyet DVD.

In 1995, she sang back-up vocals with Sinéad O'Connor for one of Dusty Springfield's last television appearances, singing "Where Is a Woman to Go?" on the music show Later...with Jools Holland.

=== 2000s: Return to recording and touring ===
In August 2002, Moyet was released from her Sony contract. Moyet signed to Sanctuary Records and released her first studio album in eight years. Hometime was produced by The Insects, who had also produced works by Massive Attack and Madonna. The release of the CD launched Moyet into the top five best-selling female UK artists of 2002, and resulted in a BRIT Awards nomination for Best Female Vocalist. Hometime was certified Gold in the UK for sales in excess of 100,000 copies.

Voice, a collection of cover versions, was released on 6 September 2004 and entered the UK Albums Chart at No. 7. Scored and produced by Academy Award winner Anne Dudley, the album was later re-issued with a bonus track, "Alfie". A companion DVD, One Blue Voice, was released in 2006. Voice was certified Gold in the UK within four weeks of its release.

In December 2006, Moyet signed a recording contract with W14 Music, a Universal Music Group imprint. The deal saw Moyet reunited with label head John Williams, who was A&R man for her previous two albums, Hometime and Voice.

Moyet's album, The Turn, was released on 15 October 2007, preceded by the single "One More Time" a week earlier. The album featured self-penned songs, including the three numbers she wrote for the stage play, Smaller in which she starred with Dawn French. For these songs, again Moyet worked alongside producer/songwriter and frequent Moyet collaborator Pete Glenister. The Turn debuted at No. 21 on the UK Albums Chart on 22 October 2007. Moyet left W14 shortly after the release of The Turn. During mid-2008, Moyet reunited with Vince Clarke as Yazoo for a series of live dates.

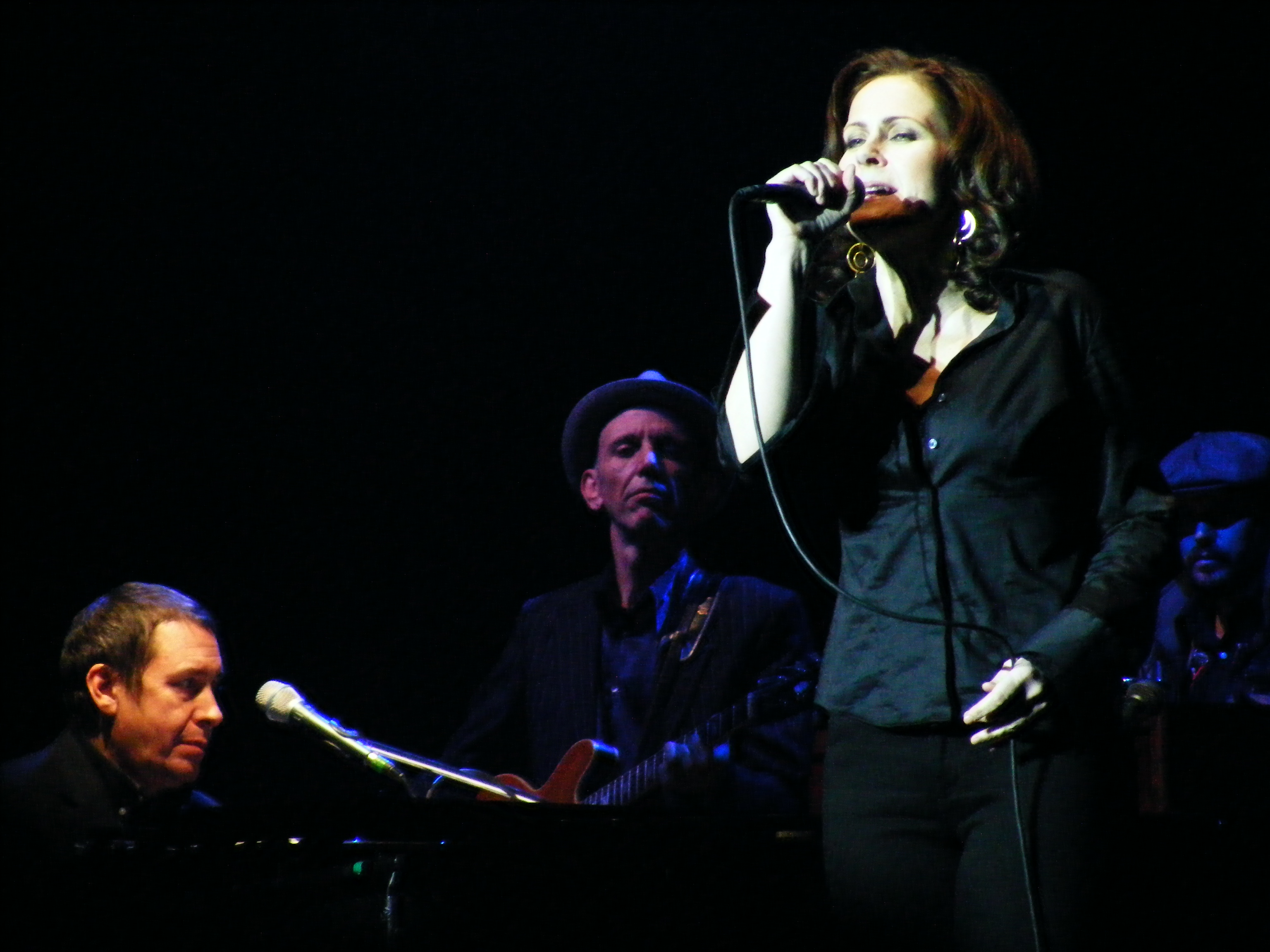
Moyet with Jools Holland's Rhythm and Blues Orchestra at the Apollo Theatre, Manchester, December 2010

Sony Music released The Best of Alison Moyet on 19 October 2009. It was Moyet's personal selection of tracks from her seven solo albums. The deluxe edition of the album, The Best of: 25 Years Revisited, contained an extra disc, with re-recorded versions of older songs. Moyet supported the release with a tour of the UK and Ireland during November and December 2009.

=== 2010–present: Return to synth-pop roots ===
In 2010, Moyet provided vocals to My Robot Friend's single "Waiting". That same year she appeared with Jools Holland throughout his tour of the UK in 2010, as well as contributed vocals to "The Man That Got Away" on Holland's album Rocking Horse.

Moyet appeared with Heather Peace in January 2012 on the final concert of Peace's first studio album, Fairytales.

Moyet announced on BBC Radio 6 Music that her new album with Guy Sigsworth would be released in 2012, but in February that year she stated: "I appear to have forfeited my recording deal because I won't do reality TV. No-one needs to make an album that badly. Tea anyone?" In an interview with Touchbase the following June, Moyet confirmed that she was still recording her album and that she was not rushing it.

On 22 January 2013, Moyet announced that she had signed a worldwide deal with London-based record label Cooking Vinyl. Sony Music had earlier announced that Moyet's four solo albums on the label (Alf, Raindancing, Hoodoo and Essex) were being digitally remastered and would be reissued with B-sides and bonus material. In February 2013, Moyet said of the remastered albums: "The project was Sony's – some initial work was done and then the project was suspended."

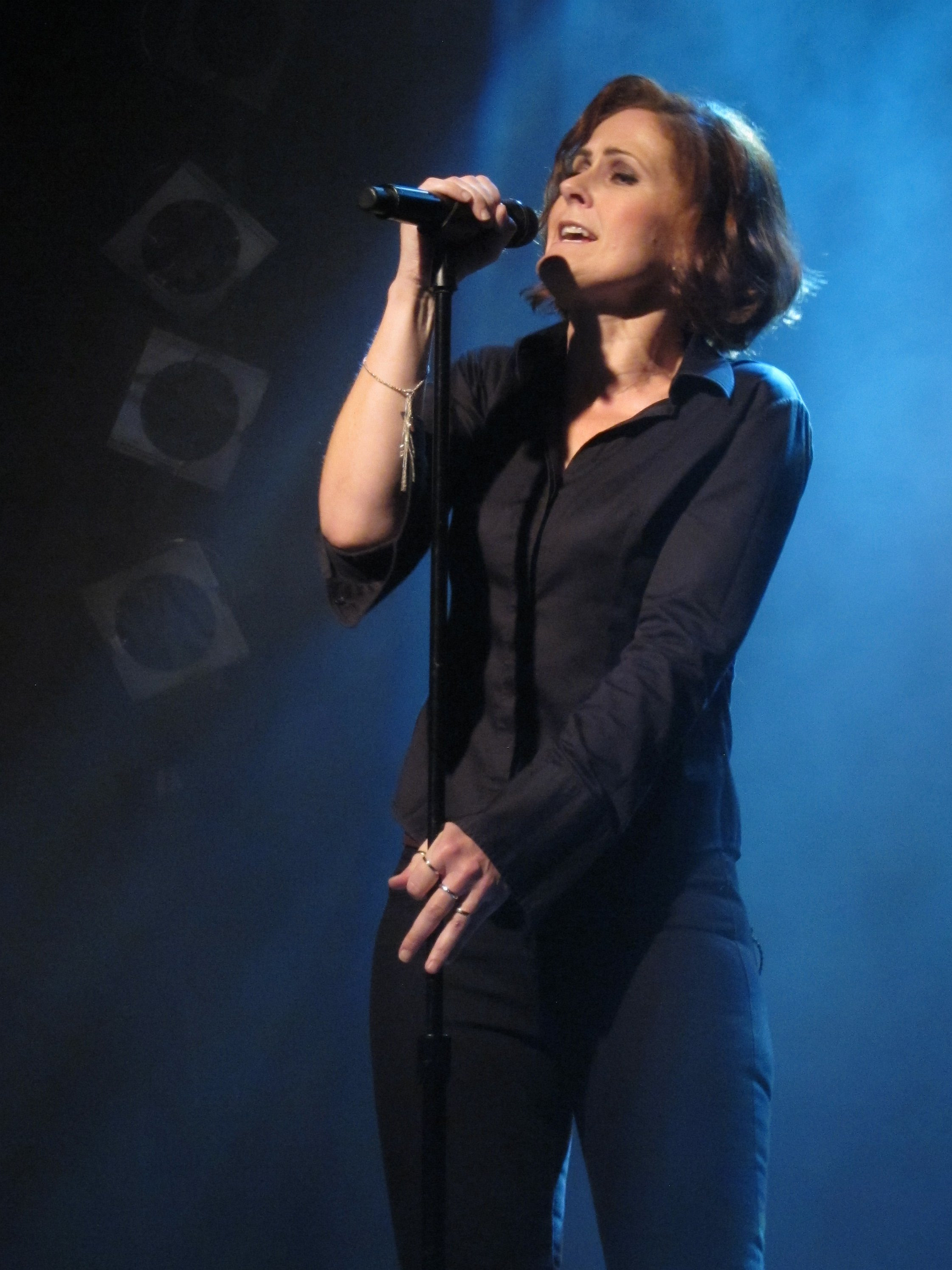
Moyet in the Gruenspan Hamburg, September 2013

The Minutes was released in the UK on 6 May 2013. The first single, "When I Was Your Girl", was released on 1 April 2013. A tour of the UK and Ireland to promote the album was announced for October. Describing the album, Moyet said: "I avoided listening to anything during the process of writing and recording this album, choosing instead to be led by my own melodic voice, the one I now find myself with 30-years-in. Guy Sigsworth returns me to a programmer's world and marries it with perfect musicality. I have been waiting for him. We have made an album mindless of industry mores that apply to middle-aged women and have shunned all talk of audiences, demographics and advert jazz covers. This has easily been my happiest studio experience". The Minutes debuted at number 5 on the UK Albums Chart, her highest debut since 1987's Raindancing.

In July 2013, Moyet said that she has begun writing new material for the follow-up to The Minutes.

On 16 October 2013, Moyet appeared as a guest performer on ITV 1's The One and Only Cilla Black celebrating Cilla Black's 50 years in show business. Moyet sang "Anyone Who Had a Heart".

On 10 November 2014, Moyet released a live album, Minutes and Seconds – Live, taken from The Minutes Tour.

On 30 July 2015, it was announced that Moyet would be releasing deluxe editions of her albums Hometime, Voice, and The Turn. According to her official web site: "Each album will feature plenty of bonus material – including some rare and previously unreleased material."

On 21 September 2015, Moyet performed at the Burberry Show at London Fashion Week. Her set was released as a digital EP, Live for Burberry on 23 September.

On 27 September 2016, it was announced that Moyet's first four studio albums Alf, Raindancing, Hoodooo and Essex would be reissued as Deluxe editions after having been remastered by BMG on 25 November 2016. Each double-disc set comes in a casebound book with the original album remastered from the original tapes along with 12-inch remixes, b-sides and previously unreleased songs.

Moyet's ninth studio album Other, described as "intelligent, adventurous electronic pop," co-produced by Guy Sigsworth, was released 16 June 2017 on Cooking Vinyl. From September through December that same year, she embarked on a world tour, The Other Tour.

In October 2017, Moyet featured as guest artist on the Norwegian band A-Ha's acoustic album, MTV Unplugged – Summer Solstice, singing "Summer Moved On". The performance was recorded at Giske island in Norway in June 2017.

On 20 April 2018, Moyet released her second live album, The Other Live Collection, taken from The Other Tour.

Moyet released the album Key on 4 October 2024, charting at no.8 in the UK Album Charts. The album contains 16 reworked singles and deep cuts, alongside two brand new tracks. A single, "Such Small Ale", premiered on Vernon Kay's mid-morning show on BBC Radio 2 and BBC Sounds on 13 June 2024. In June 2024, Moyet launched a podcast, 40 Moyet Moments, a 40-part podcast series where she discusses key moments of her career. Moyet embarked on a world tour in support of Key in 2025.

In 2026, Moyet toured with The Human League and Soft Cell for The Generations Tour in North America. A Europe, U.K., and Ireland tour is scheduled for autumn 2026. The setlist will consist of Yazoo songs along with her solo studio albums The Minutes and Other.

== Sales and charts ==
As of June 2023 her worldwide album sales have reached a certified 23 million, with over two million singles sold. All ten of her studio albums and three compilation albums have charted in the top 30 of the UK Albums Chart, reaching number one with the studio album Alf (1984) and the compilation album Singles (1995). She has also achieved nine top 30 singles and six top 10 hits on the UK Singles Chart.

== Theatre ==
Moyet made her stage debut in the London West End production of the musical Chicago in 2001. She played the part of Matron "Mama" Morton. Although the play was initially intended for a short run, it was extended to six months.

In 2006, she appeared in the play Smaller, which undertook a regional tour before a stint at London's Lyric Theatre.

== Personal life ==
Moyet's first marriage, to hairdresser and retired London firefighter Malcolm Lee, with whom she has a son, ended in divorce. Moyet has a daughter with former partner Kim McCarthy, and a daughter with her current husband David Ballard. In 2013, Moyet moved from Radlett, Hertfordshire, to Brighton.

She has been candid about her battles with weight and agoraphobia and the challenges of having dyslexia and ADHD. She embarked on a weight loss programme, because she did not want to become "an obese old woman".

On 14 October 2014, Moyet was presented with a Gold Badge Award by professional music writers association The Ivors Academy.

Moyet was appointed Member of the Order of the British Empire (MBE) in the 2021 Birthday Honours for services to music.

She is a supporter of Southend United.

Moyet received a degree in Fine Art Printmaking from the University of Brighton in 2023 at age 62.

== Discography ==
Studio albums

- Alf (1984)
- Raindancing (1987)
- Hoodoo (1991)
- Essex (1994)
- Hometime (2002)
- Voice (2004)
- The Turn (2007)
- The Minutes (2013)
- Other (2017)
- Key (2024)

== Awards and nominations ==
Award	Year	Nominee(s)	Category	Result	Ref.
AIM Independent Music Awards	2025	Herself	Best Live Performer	Nominated	
Brit Awards	1983	Yazoo	British Breakthrough Act	Won	
Brit Awards	1983	Yazoo	British Group	Nominated	
Brit Awards	1984	Herself	British Female Solo Artist	Nominated	
Brit Awards	1985	Herself	British Female Solo Artist	Won	
Brit Awards	1986	Herself	British Female Solo Artist	Nominated	
Brit Awards	1988	Herself	British Female Solo Artist	Won	
Brit Awards	2003	Herself	British Female Solo Artist	Nominated	
Classic Pop Readers' Awards	2018	Herself	Solo Act of the Year	Won	
Goldene Europa	1985	Herself	Best International Artist	Won	
Grammy Awards	1993	"It Won't Be Long"	Best Rock Vocal Performance, Female	Nominated	
Silver Clef Awards	2013	Herself	Icon Award	Won	
The Ivors Academy	2014	Herself	BASCA Gold Badge Awards	Won	
Virgin Media Music Awards	2004	Herself	Best Comeback	Nominated	
