= This House (Alison Moyet song) =

1991 single by Alison Moyet

Single by Alison Moyet

from the album Hoodoo
- B-side: "Come Back Home"
- Released: 30 September 1991
- Genre: Pop
- Length: 3:53
- Label: Columbia
- Songwriter(s): Alison Moyet
- Producer(s): Dave Dix

Alison Moyet singles chronology
"Wishing You Were Here" (1991)	"This House" (1991)	"Falling" (1993)

"This House" is a song by the British singer-songwriter Alison Moyet, released on 30 September 1991 as the fourth single from her third studio album, Hoodoo (1991). It was written by Moyet and produced by Dave Dix. The song reached No. 40 on the UK Singles Chart and also reached the top 40 in the Netherlands, peaking at number 31 on the Dutch Top 40.

== Background ==
Having recorded her second studio album Raindancing while living in Los Angeles, Alison Moyet returned to live in England after completing a world tour. Moyet's record company, CBS, wanted her to continue producing pop hits but this left the singer feeling artistically compromised and under pressure to deliver. During the period after returning to England, Moyet began a songwriting partnership with Pete Glenister, who had been Moyet's guitarist for part of the Raindancing tour. Keen to have more artistic freedom, she suggested to CBS that Glenister should produce her. Muff Winwood of the label's A&R division granted Moyet permission to record the album she wanted to, with Hoodoo being released in April 1991.

"This House" had originally been recorded and released as the B-side to Moyet's 1987 non-album single "Love Letters". For Hoodoo, the song was re-recorded with Dave Dix as producer. On her official website, Moyet has cited the song as one of her favourites from Hoodoo.

== Release and promotion ==
In the United Kingdom, "This House" was released through Columbia Records on 7-inch vinyl, CD, and cassette on 30 September 1991. The following week, on 7 October, a limited-edition picture CD was also issued. The B-side, "Come Back Home", is exclusive to the single. Two additional tracks are included on the 12-inch vinyl and CD versions of the single: Moyet's previous hit singles "Love Letters" and "That Ole Devil Called Love". "This House" reached No. 40 on the UK Singles Chart and remained in the top 100 for five weeks. A music video was filmed to promote the single. Later in 2009, Moyet performed the song on The Paul O'Grady Show to help promote her compilation The Best of: 25 Years Revisited.

== Critical reception ==
Upon its release as a single, Mike Fox of the Hull Daily Mail gave "This House" a four out of five star rating. He noted how the "self-penned ballad about loneliness" is "perfect" for Moyet's voice, which he felt has "got stronger and more confident over the years". However, he questioned its commercial potential, adding, "In 1991 it's difficult to see this inward-looking song getting very far in the charts, despite the tune being pretty addictive." In a review of Hoodoo, Musician wrote, "...she also understands that style is meaningless without emotional content. From the anger of 'Rise' to die anguish in 'This House,' that's what keeps this collection from turning into just another singer's showcase." Describing the song as "gospel-tinged", People commented, "When she sings with minimal acoustic backing, as on "This House" or "Wishing You Were Here," she showcases her gifts best." The Greyhound (Loyola University Maryland) stated, "Without missing a beat, Moyet slides earily into the beautiful balladry of "This House"."

Tom Demalon of AllMusic picked the song as a standout track, commenting, "...she's still more than capable of expressing heart-aching vulnerability, though, especially on the gorgeous 'This House,' where a split-second pause gives way to her passionately imploring, 'Who will take your place?'" Loz Etheridge of God is in the TV noted: "Those who only know her for her earlier works will be somewhat bewildered at the depth of emotion displayed on the likes of the tortured 'This House'."

== Track listings ==
UK 7-inch and cassette single

1. "This House" – 3:53
2. "Come Back Home" – 3:20

UK CD single and European 12-inch single

1. "This House" – 3:53
2. "Come Back Home" – 3:20
3. "Love Letters" – 2:50
4. "That Ole Devil Called Love" – 3:02

== Personnel ==
Musicians

- Alison Moyet – lead vocals, backing vocals, backing vocal arrangement
- Dave Dix – keyboards and Zing piano on "This House"
- Graham Henderson – piano on "This House"
- Hugh Burns – guitar on "This House"

Production

- Dave Dix – producer of "This House", arrangement, mixing and programming on "This House"
- Alison Moyet – arrangement and programming on "This House", producer of "Love Letters"
- Pete Glenister – programming and mixing on "This House", producer of "Come Back Home"
- Chris Dickey – engineer and mixer on "This House"
- Neil Brockbank – engineer and mixer on "This House", engineer on "Come Back Home"
- John Fryer, Barry Hammond – engineers on "This House"
- Steve Lillywhite – mixing on "Come Back Home"
- Steve Brown – producer of "Love Letters"
- Pete Wingfield – producer of "That Ole Devil Called Love"

Other

- Kevin Cummins – photography
- DKB, London – design

== Charts ==
Chart (1991)	Peak position
Netherlands (Dutch Top 40)	31
Netherlands (Single Top 100)	32
UK Singles (OCC)	40

== Cover versions ==
Gwyneth Herbert recorded a version of the song on Janette Mason's 2014 album D'Ranged.
