= Love Resurrection =

Single by Alison Moyet

from the album Alf
- B-side: "Baby I Do"
- Released: 11 June 1984
- Genre: Pop
- Label: Columbia
- Songwriters: Steve Jolley, Alison Moyet, Tony Swain
- Producer: Jolley & Swain

Alison Moyet singles chronology
"Love Resurrection" (1984)	"All Cried Out" (1984)

Music video
- "Love Resurrection" on YouTube

"Love Resurrection" is a pop song written by English singer-songwriter Alison Moyet and producers Jolley & Swain for Moyet's debut studio album Alf (1984). Released as the album's first single in June 1984, it reached number 10 in the UK Singles Chart. It was released in the US in summer 1985 following "Invisible" and reached number 82 on the Billboard Hot 100 that August.

== Background ==
Speaking to Number One in 1984, Moyet said "Love Resurrection" was "written over the phone": "I'd had an argument with a friend and gone to bed like I usually do when I'm depressed. I wrote the lyric straight off and read it over to Steve [Jolley]. He called me back with a melody line and we went on from there."

== Music videos ==
There are two versions of the music video. The first version, made for the worldwide single release, shows Moyet at a Middle Eastern encampment in the desert. As she wanders through, the camera pans across the barren landscape and zooms in on a skull figure. The video was shot in Israel and cost £17,000.

The second version, made for the American market, showed a softer side to Moyet following the breakup of Yazoo. The video shows Moyet, dressed all in white, performing the song in a darkened venue with a backup band in front of a small audience.

== Critical reception ==
Upon its release, Max Bell of Number One noted the song's "MOR direction" and commented, "Alf gives it loads but the Swain and Jollified electronic wash which accompanies is not entirely suitable and leaves you feeling that here is a catchphrase in search of a song. Tender but disposable." In a Number One review of Moyet's follow-up single "All Cried Out", Paul Bursche praised "Love Resurrection" as being "magnificent, perhaps the best song of 1984". Jessi McGuire of Record Mirror noted a "hideous similarity with Justin Hayward in the chorus", but added, "Alison proves here that she's still the queen of the larger lady singers, with a cool bit of summer pop that ought to be a great hit." Hugh Fielder of Sounds remarked, "The song proves she doesn't need Vince but the arrangement proves she doesn't need major label airplay-fixated tunnel vision either. Somebody stop her quick before she has a hit."

== Track listing ==
7" single

1. "Love Resurrection" – 3:49
2. "Baby I Do" – 3:10

7" single (US promo)

1. "Love Resurrection" – 3:49
2. "Love Resurrection" – 3:49

12" single

1. "Love Resurrection" (Long Version) – 5:33
2. "Baby I Do" – 3:10

12" single

1. "Love Resurrection" (Love Injected Remix) – 8:48
2. "Baby I Do" – 3:10

12" single (US promo)

1. "Love Resurrection" (Album Version) – 5:33
2. "Love Resurrection" (Single Version) – 3:49

== Versions ==
- "Love Resurrection" (Single Version) - 3:49
- "Love Resurrection" (Love Injected Mix a.k.a. Long Version) - 8:50
- "Love Resurrection" (US Long Version) - 5:31

== Charts ==
=== Weekly charts ===
Chart (1984–85)	Peak position
Australia (Kent Music Report)	17
Belgium (Ultratop 50 Flanders)	23
Canada Top Singles (RPM)	39
Netherlands (Dutch Top 40)	25
Netherlands (Single Top 100)	26
Ireland (IRMA)	8
Italy (Musica e dischi)	4
New Zealand (Recorded Music NZ)	18
UK Singles (Official Charts)	10
US Billboard Hot 100	82
US Dance Club Songs (Billboard)	47
US Hot Dance/Disco 12 Inch Singles Sales (Billboard)	49
US Cash Box Top 100 Singles	81

=== Year-end charts ===
Year-end chart performance for "Love Resurrection"
Chart (1984)	Position
UK Singles (Gallup)	95

== Cover versions ==
A dance cover by D'Lux was released in June 1996 and reached number 58 in the UK charts.

Christian singer Kim Boyce also covered this song for her 1986 self-titled debut album on Myrrh Records.
