= Ordinary Girl (Alison Moyet song) =

Single by Alison Moyet

from the album Raindancing
- B-side: "Palm of Your Hand (Cloak and Dagger)"
- Released: May 1987
- Genre: Pop rock, indie pop
- Length: 3:26
- Label: CBS Records
- Songwriters: Alison Moyet; Jess Bailey; Rick Driscoll
- Producer: Jimmy Iovine

Alison Moyet singles chronology
"Weak in the Presence of Beauty" (1987)	"Ordinary Girl" (1987)	"Sleep Like Breathing" (1987)

Music video
- "Ordinary Girl" on YouTube

"Ordinary Girl" is a song by English singer Alison Moyet, which was released in 1987 as the third single from her second studio album Raindancing. It was written by Moyet, Jess Bailey and Rick Driscoll, and was produced by Jimmy Iovine.

Despite the Top 10 success of the first two singles from Raindancing, "Ordinary Girl" failed to enter the UK Top 40, reaching No. 43. It remained within the Top 100 for four weeks.

A music video was filmed to promote the single. Moyet performed the song on ITV's short lived music show The Roxy, as well as the French & Saunders Show. She also performed the song on "Pop Goes New Year 1987" aboard HMS Royal. She performed two other songs on the ship, "Is This Love?" and "Blow Wind Blow", both from the same album.

The single's B-side is "Palm Of Your Hand (Cloak and Dagger)", which was exclusive to the single. It was written and produced by Dan Hartman.

== Critical reception ==
On its release, Ian Cranna of Smash Hits described "Ordinary Girl" as an "excellent and unusual song" and praised its lyrics, but added, "Pity the pushy synthetic music doesn't really match up to the idea or the typically wonderful singing." Jane Solanas of New Musical Express noted the "interesting subject matter" of "platonic love between women", but felt the song was a "pretty basic pop single" and one that "lesbians will buy in their thousands". Vincent O'Keeffe of The Kerryman described it as "an unusual song about the singer's best friend who suddenly leaves home" and added that "the idea and music work and blend in perfectly together."

In a review of Raindancing, Chris Heath of Smash Hits highlighted the song as one of the two best songs on the album, alongside "Stay". He also described "Ordinary Girl" as "sprightly". In a retrospective review of the album, Darren Howard of Gay Times felt that the song, along with "Is This Love?", "show Alison at her best".

== Formats ==
7" Single

1. "Ordinary Girl" - 3:26
2. "Palm Of Your Hand (Cloak And Dagger)" - 3:53

12" Single

1. "Ordinary Girl (Remix)" - 5:34
2. "Ordinary Girl (Single Version)" - 3:26
3. "Palm Of Your Hand (Cloak And Dagger)" - 3:53

12" Single (Special Dance Mix)

1. "Ordinary Girl (Dance Mix)" - 6:28
2. "Ordinary Girl (Single Version)" - 3:26
3. "Palm Of Your Hand (Cloak And Dagger)" - 3:53

== Charts ==
=== Weekly charts ===
Chart (1987)	Peak position
Belgium (Ultratop 50 Flanders)	31
Dutch Singles Chart	49
Irish Singles Chart	22
Italy Airplay (Music & Media)	20
New Zealand (Recorded Music NZ)	49
UK Singles Chart	43

== Personnel ==
- Producer on "Ordinary Girl" – Jimmy Iovine
- Mixer on "Ordinary Girl (Remix)" - Steve Brown
- Mixer on "Ordinary Girl (Single Version)" - Mike Shipley
- Producer of "Palm Of Your Hand (Cloak And Dagger)" – Dan Hartman
- Remixer on "Ordinary Girl (Dance Mix)" - Pete Hammond
- Associate Producer on "Ordinary Girl (Dance Mix)" and "Ordinary Girl (Single Version)" - Mike Shipley
