= Raindancing =

Studio album by Alison Moyet
- Released: 6 April 1987
- Recorded: 1986–1987
- Genre: Pop
- Length: 39:22
- Label: CBS
- Producers: Jess Bailey; David Freeman; Jean Guiot; Joseph Hughes; Jimmy Iovine; Alison Moyet

Alison Moyet chronology
Alf (1984)	Raindancing (1987)	Hoodoo (1991)

Alternative cover
- US cover

Singles from Raindancing
- 1. "Is This Love?" Released: November 1986; 2. "Weak in the Presence of Beauty" Released: February 1987; 3. "Ordinary Girl" Released: May 1987; 4. "Sleep Like Breathing" Released: September 1987

Raindancing is the second solo studio album by English singer Alison Moyet, released on 6 April 1987 by CBS Records. It reached No. 2 on the UK Albums Chart and features the singles "Is This Love?", "Weak in the Presence of Beauty", "Ordinary Girl" and "Sleep Like Breathing". In the United States, Raindancing was released by Columbia Records with a different cover art and a reordered track listing.

Largely produced by Jimmy Iovine, the album includes contributions from various session musicians such as T. M. Stevens, Omar Hakim and Herb Alpert. The album was originally going to be titled Chasing Rain, taken from a line in "Sleep Like Breathing".

A deluxe edition of Raindancing was released on 25 November 2016 by BMG.

== Background ==
Following the release of her successful debut album Alf, Moyet decided to move to Los Angeles, where she stayed for nearly a year. The move to the United States had been prompted by Moyet's manager, who himself had found work there for a year and suggested she relocate there too. Once settled in Los Angeles, Moyet's manager enlisted Jimmy Iovine to produce the majority of the Raindancing album.

The majority of songs that would appear on the album had already been written back in England. For some of these songs, Moyet teamed up with guitarist Rick Driscoll and keyboardist Jess Bailey. "Is This Love?" was co-written with David A. Stewart of Eurythmics while Moyet was living in Los Angeles. As a friend of Iovine's, Stewart had called into the studio to see Iovine, who suggested he and Moyet write a song together. To avoid problems with his publishers, Stewart's contribution was disguised under the pseudonym Jean Guiot. "Sleep Like Breathing" was written by David Freeman and Joseph Hughes of The Lover Speaks. The duo contributed three songs to the Raindancing sessions, though only "Sleep Like Breathing" would be included on the album. "Weak in the Presence of Beauty" was written by Michael Ward and Rob Clarke, and originally recorded by their band Floy Joy in 1986. Moyet chose to record her own version of the song for the album, but would later reveal that she only recorded it because she knew it would be a hit.

Raindancing was released in April 1987. Continuing her success in the United Kingdom, the album reached No. 2 and remained on the chart for 53 weeks. In America, the album peaked at No. 94, faring less well commercially than Alf. Across Europe and elsewhere, the album was a commercial success. It topped the charts in both New Zealand and Norway.

The album also spawned four singles. The lead single "Is This Love?" was released in November 1986 and reached No. 3 in the UK, while becoming a hit across Europe and beyond. However, the single failed to chart in the US where it was released in March 1987. "Weak in the Presence of Beauty" was the album's second single, released in February 1987. It reached No. 6 in the UK and was also another hit elsewhere. It was released as a single in America in August 1987 but failed to chart. "Ordinary Girl", the album's third single, was less successful commercially when released in May 1987, peaking at No. 43 in the UK and No. 22 in Ireland. The final single was Sleep Like Breathing", a duet with David Freeman. It peaked at No. 80 in the UK after being released in September 1987.

To promote the album, Moyet embarked on her only world tour. Although successful, Moyet would later describe the tour as "lack-lustre", while noting that it signalled her breakdown with her label CBS. In 1988, the success of the album contributed to Moyet receiving her second Brit Award for Best British Female Solo Artist. Despite the success of Raindancing, Moyet later revealed she was not happy with the album's American sound. Later recalling the album's period in 2007, Moyet felt that using an American producer and giving much control to engineers was a "bad move". Writing for her website, Moyet recalled: "I do like some of the songs but the conception of them was all wrong... what was written as jangly, English irony got the American session, pop treatment. I didn't involve myself in the 'sound'. I was driving on cruise control. It was made and not felt."

== Critical reception ==
Professional ratings
Review scores
Source	Rating
AllMusic	3/5 stars
Louder Than War	7.5/10
Number One	3/4 stars
Record Mirror	3/5 stars
Reflections of Darkness	7/10
Smash Hits	7/10 stars
Sounds	3/5 stars

Upon its release, Fran Jepps of Number One commented on the "very enjoyable mix of moods" and Moyet's "much smoother and altogether more classy" vocals. Chris Heath of Smash Hits considered Raindancing to be similar to Moyet's debut album, Alf, with ten "fairly polite pop songs", albeit with "less roaring singing and less emphasis on being intensely 'soulful'". He added, "Not that it's bad – most of it is in the same chug-along vein as the two singles, but it'd be nice if it didn't all sound so safe and predictable." Jack Barron of Sounds felt that Moyet's "blue blanket voice has been smothered by chartland's sterile style fog", but added there are "some fine songs" despite the "distracting commercial sheen". He praised the singer's "utter lack of pretence, her lyrical directness and those occasional flashes when her voice unfurls once more", and noted the "wide musical ranges" on the "eclectic album". However, he was critical of Iovine's production, believing that Moyet's "individuality has been stifled by the values he's imposed", with "passion suffocated by lushness and fragility by a synthetic instrumental gleam". Betty Page of Record Mirror believed there were "several average songs", with Moyet putting a "workmanlike performance on [those] that don't stretch her at all". She praised the "gorgeous echoing ripples" of "Blow Wind Blow" and the "highlight of the set, the gloriously sensual" "Sleep Like Breathing".

In the US, Cashbox stated that Moyet's "disarmingly plaintive vocals haunt this inviting Jimmy Iovine production". Billboard believed that the album, "laced with a high-gloss sheen by Iovine", "may produce the knockout for her". Barry Walters of Spin noted how the involvement of "mega-mainstream FM guru" Jimmy Iovine had pushed Moyet into the "'Til Tuesday camp of semisweet pop", but added that "most of the originals triumph through Moyet's intimate presence, both as an intelligent songwriter and an anguished voice one never tires of". Musician believed Raindancing "lacks the instant appeal of Swain & Jolley's intellectualized dance music", but added, "Though the performances here take a bit more patience to appreciate, they're no less rewarding; if anything, Moyet's interpretive gifts have grown, and Jimmy Iovine's understated production takes pains not to get in the way, which is why the likes of 'Sleep Like Breathing' or 'Weak in the Presence of Beauty' hold such lasting allure." Jonathan Butler of People praised Moyet's "captivating voice", but felt that Iovine had "dragged her out of her element and into the treacherous waters of corny pop sentiment" by "mismatch[ing] her with too-fast beats that make Moyet sound frowsy and pedestrian".

In a review of the 2016 deluxe edition of Raindancing, Helena Adams of Reflections of Darkness commented, "The purpose of Raindancing was clear: to establish Alison Moyet as the pop star across the big pond. [It] fits the bar of commercial albums back then, the overproduction provides it with a poppy freshness that Alf lacked." Josh Lee of Attitude noted that "big choruses that demand to be sung along to don't come more insistent" than on "Is This Love?" and "Weak in the Presence of Beauty". Gay Times writer Darren Howard wrote: "It's not that it's a bad album, it's just not very 'Moyet' in places. Having said that, it does contain the almighty 'Is This Love' and the beautiful 'Ordinary Girl' which both show Alison at her best."

== Track listing ==
No.	Title	Writer(s)	Length
1.	"Weak in the Presence of Beauty"	Michael Ward, Rob Clarke	3:46
2.	"Ordinary Girl"	Alison Moyet, Jess Bailey, Rick Driscoll	3:23
3.	"You Got Me Wrong"	Moyet	4:06
4.	"Without You"	Moyet	3:29
5.	"Sleep Like Breathing"	David Freeman, Joseph Hughes	4:22
6.	"Is This Love?"	Moyet, Jean Guiot	3:57
7.	"Blow Wind Blow"	Moyet, Bailey	5:46
8.	"Glorious Love"	Moyet, Bailey, Driscoll	4:20
9.	"When I Say (No Giveaway)"	Moyet, Bailey, Driscoll	2:55
10.	"Stay"	Moyet, Bailey, Driscoll	3:28

2016 remastered deluxe edition (bonus disc)
No.	Title	Writer(s)	Length
1.	"Is This Love?" (L.A. Mix)		5:21
2.	"Blow Wind Blow" (Long Version)		6:20
3.	"Weak in the Presence of Beauty" (Extended Mix)		6:05
4.	"To Work on You"	Moyet, Robert S. Nevil	4:15
5.	"Take My Imagination to Bed"	Freeman, Hughes	3:44
6.	"Ordinary Girl" (Remix)		5:36
7.	"Palm of Your Hand (Cloak & Dagger)"	Dan Hartman	3:53
8.	"Ordinary Girl" (Dance Mix)		6:29
9.	"Love Letters"	Edward Heyman, Victor Young	2:50
10.	"This House" (Original Mix)	Moyet	5:51
11.	"Love Letters" (Extended Version)		3:34
12.	"The Coventry Carol"	Traditional	3:26
13.	"Love Resurrection" (live at Wembley Arena, 1987)	Moyet, Steve Jolley, Tony Swain	6:21
14.	"Ne me quitte pas" (live at Wembley Arena, 1987)	Jacques Brel	4:45
15.	"You and Me" (Demo)	Moyet, Dave Dix	3:40
16.	"Let's Get Personal" (James Brown featuring Alison Moyet)	Moyet, Hartman, Charlie Midnight	4:28

== Personnel ==
- See InfoBox for full producer listing
- Associate Producer: Mike Shipley
- Recorded & Engineered By Joe Chiccarelli, John Fryer, Robert de la Garza & Mark Desisto
- Mixed By Jess Bailey, Alison Moyet, Scott Litt, Mike Shipley & Humberto Gatica
- Mastered By Vladimir "Vlado" Meller
- Richard Houghton – sleeve photography
- Rob O'Connor (Stylorouge) – design, art direction

== Charts ==
=== Weekly charts ===
1987 weekly chart performance for Raindancing
Chart (1987)	Peak position
Australian Albums (Kent Music Report)	15
Austrian Albums (Ö3 Austria)	23
Canada Top Albums/CDs (RPM)	36
Dutch Albums (Album Top 100)	5
European Albums (Music & Media)	6
Finnish Albums (Suomen virallinen lista)	6
German Albums (Offizielle Top 100)	3
Italian Albums (Musica e dischi)	15
New Zealand Albums (RMNZ)	1
Norwegian Albums (VG-lista)	1
Swedish Albums (Sverigetopplistan)	4
Swiss Albums (Schweizer Hitparade)	4
UK Albums (Official Charts)	2
US Billboard 200	94

1995 weekly chart performance for Raindancing
Chart (1995)	Peak position
UK Albums (Official Charts)	98

=== Year-end charts ===
Year-end chart performance for Raindancing
Chart (1987)	Position
Australian Albums (Kent Music Report)	66
Dutch Albums (Album Top 100)	37
European Albums (Music & Media)	27
German Albums (Offizielle Top 100)	26
New Zealand Albums (RMNZ)	8
Norwegian Autumn Period Albums (VG-lista)	15
UK Albums (Gallup)	13

== Certifications ==
Certifications for Raindancing
Region	Certification	Certified units/sales
Germany (BVMI)	Gold	250,000^{^}
Netherlands (NVPI)	Gold	50,000^{^}
New Zealand (RMNZ)	Platinum	15,000^{^}
United Kingdom (BPI)	2× Platinum	600,000^{^}
^{^} Shipments figures based on certification alone.
