= Is This Love? (Alison Moyet song) =

1986 single by Alison Moyet

Single by Alison Moyet

from the album Raindancing
- B-side: "Blow Wind Blow"
- Released: 17 November 1986
- Length: 4:00
- Label: Columbia
- Songwriters: Alison Moyet; Jean Guiot
- Producer: Jimmy Iovine

Alison Moyet singles chronology
"For You Only" (1985)	"Is This Love?" (1986)	"Weak in the Presence of Beauty" (1987)

Music video
- "Is This Love?" on YouTube

"Is This Love?" is a song by British singer-songwriter Alison Moyet, released in November 1986 as the first single from her second studio album Raindancing (1987). The song was written by Moyet and Dave Stewart, who used the pseudonym Jean Guiot for his involvement with the song.

== Background ==
Following the release of her successful debut album, Alf, Moyet decided to move to Los Angeles where she remained for almost a year. Once settled, Moyet's manager hired Jimmy Iovine to produce her second studio album. Although most of the songs had already been written back in England, "Is This Love?" was written in Los Angeles. Dave Stewart, a friend of Iovine's, called into the studio to see him one day while Moyet was recording there. Iovine suggested that the pair should write a song together. To avoid problems with his publishers, Stewart's contribution was disguised under the pseudonym Jean Guiot. Moyet later recalled in 2016: "Dave jammed together a couple of chords, raised the melody idea and then I took it away, wrote the lyrics and played with the tune. We had a really good time recording it."

"Is This Love?" was released on 17 November 1986 as the lead single from Raindancing. It became a big hit in the UK, Europe and elsewhere in the world. In March 1987, it was released as the album's lead single in the United States but failed to chart.

== Critical reception ==
Upon its release, Max Bell of Number One said: "Everyone's favourite big sister holds back the histrionics and resists the temptation of a big Jimmy Iovine production special. I've just heard the single is selling like hot cakes. A definite Number One of course!" Stuart Bailie of Record Mirror wrote: "This is quite reminiscent of Alf's days with Yazoo. To pull off something this simple takes confidence and character, and this one will be a grower, whether you like it or not."

Ro Newton of Smash Hits wrote: "Alison Moyet's been biding her time lately in L.A., recording new material but really this is nothing to bring you or her out in a sweat. "Is This Love?" is tunesome alright but hardly enough for her to wrap her tonsils around. This woman is worthy of far greater things than this." Jane Simon of Sounds wrote, "Alison Moyet continues to write her cynical little essays as though love was something she'd heard about in a Eurythmics song but was not convinced by."

== Music video ==
A music video was filmed to promote the single. It was directed by Nick Morris and produced by Fiona O'Mahoney for MGMM. The video was shot at Carlyon Bay near St Austell, Cornwall, at the now-demolished Cornwall Coliseum entertainment venue, and along Crinnis beach. In the US, it achieved breakout rotation on MTV.

== Track listings ==
7-inch single

1. "Is This Love?" – 3:59
2. "Blow Wind Blow" – 5:10

12-inch single

1. "Is This Love?" (L.A. mix) – 5:23
2. "Is This Love?" (single version) – 3:59
3. "Blow Wind Blow" (long version) – 6:19

12-inch single (UK release)

1. "Is This Love?" (L.A. mix) – 5:23
2. "Blow Wind Blow" (long version) – 6:19
3. "For You Only" (Europa mix) – 6:14

== Charts ==
=== Weekly charts ===
Weekly chart performance for "Is This Love?"
Chart (1986–1987)	Peak position
Australia (Kent Music Report)	13
Belgium (Ultratop 50 Flanders)	5
Europe (European Hot 100 Singles)	1
Finland (Suomen virallinen lista)	12
Ireland (IRMA)	4
Italy (Musica e dischi)	19
Italy Airplay (Music & Media)	3
Netherlands (Dutch Top 40)	11
Netherlands (Single Top 100)	16
New Zealand (Recorded Music NZ)	7
Norway (VG-lista)	3
Portugal (AFP)	2
South Africa (Springbok Radio)	2
Sweden (Sverigetopplistan)	5
Switzerland (Schweizer Hitparade)	20
UK Singles (Official Charts)	3
West Germany (GfK)	15

=== Year-end charts ===
Year-end chart performance for "Is This Love?"
Chart (1987)	Position
Australia (Australian Music Report)	81
Belgium (Ultratop 50 Flanders)	48
Europe (European Hot 100 Singles)	37
Netherlands (Dutch Top 40)	83
New Zealand (RIANZ)	22
South Africa (Springbok Radio)	9
UK Singles (Gallup)	89
West Germany (Media Control)	74
