= All Cried Out (Alison Moyet song) =

1984 song

Single by Alison Moyet

from the album Alf
- Released: 25 September 1984
- Genre: Synth-pop
- Length: 6:49 (album version); 3:52 (single version)
- Label: Columbia
- Songwriters: Steve Jolley; Alison Moyet; Tony Swain
- Producer: Jolley & Swain

Alison Moyet singles chronology
"Love Resurrection" (1984)	"All Cried Out" (1984)	"Invisible" (1984)

"All Cried Out" is a song by English singer-songwriter Alison Moyet, which was released in 1984 as the second single from her debut studio album Alf. It was written by Moyet and producers Jolley & Swain. The song peaked within the top ten on both the Irish and the UK Singles Chart, and also reached the top twenty in Switzerland.

== Critical reception ==
Upon its release, Paul Bursche of Number One praised the song as following up "Love Resurrection" with "ease". He commented, "In no way am I the first to rave about this exquisite voice, nor, I suspect, shall I be the last. But I wouldn't let the voice distract me from the song. Alison Moyet not only has a great voice, she's also some songwriter." Jim Reid of Record Mirror commented, "Over a smoothly winding Imagination type backing, Alf offers a perfunctory plea of passion that says more about her vocal coach than her state of mind." Frank Edmonds of the Bury Free Press gave the song an 8 out of 10 rating and described it as "a satisfying follow-up" to "Love Resurrection". He added, "More proof of what an emotive, gutsy singer Alison is. [She] wrings every last drop of feeling, passion and power from the song." Garry Johnson of Sounds was negative in his review, calling it a "boring ballad which indicates that Alf will soon be back where she started, crooning to the alcohol-damaged in Canvey Island clubs" and added that it "sounds like a George Michael b-side".

== Track listing ==
7" single

1. "All Cried Out" – 3:52
2. "Steal Me Blind" – 3:16

12" single

1. "All Cried Out" (Extended Version) – 6:53
2. "Steal Me Blind" – 3:16

12" single

1. "All Cried Out" (The Re-mix) – 7:57
2. "Steal Me Blind" – 3:16

== Charts ==
Chart performance for "All Cried Out"
Chart (1984)	Peak position
Australia (Kent Music Report)	21
France (SNEP)	57
Germany (GfK)	24
Ireland (IRMA)	7
Italy (Musica e dischi)	15
Netherlands (Dutch Top 40)	19
Netherlands (Single Top 100)	15
New Zealand (Recorded Music NZ)	6
South Africa (RISA)	7
Switzerland (Schweizer Hitparade)	15
UK Singles (Official Charts)	8

== Jamie Watson version ==
"All Cried Out"

Single by Jamie Watson
- Released: 10 October 1995
- Length: 4:37
- Label: ZYX
- Songwriters: Steve Jolley; Alison Moyet; Tony Swain
- Producers: Darren Hodson; John Purser

Jamie Watson singles chronology
"All Cried Out" (1995)	"Hold Me Now" (1997)

In 1995, Jamie Watson covered the song. Watson made the song upbeat and in the Eurodance genre. The single reached No. 98 on the UK Singles Chart.

=== Music video ===
In the music video, Jamie Watson sings the song while Pantomimes practice depictions in his presence.

=== Track listing ===
CD-Maxi

1. "All Cried Out" (Carved In Stone Radio Mix) - 3:46
2. "All Cried Out" (Head 2 Head Extended Mix) - 5:04
3. "It's Alright" - 3:59
4. "All Cried Out" (Carved In Stone Extended Mix) - 5:10

=== Charts ===
Chart performance for "All Cried Out"
Chart (1995)	Peak position
UK Singles (Official Charts)	98

== No Angels version ==
"All Cried Out"

Single by No Angels

from the album Now... Us! & When the Angels Swing
- Released: 2 December 2002
- Studio: Park Studios (Tutzing)
- Length: 3:27 (pop version); 3:35 (swing version)
- Label: Cheyenne; Polydor
- Songwriters: Steve Jolley; Alison Moyet; Tony Swain
- Producer: Perky Park

No Angels singles chronology
"Let's Go to Bed" (2002)	"All Cried Out" (2002)	"No Angel (It's All in Your Mind)" (2003)

In 2002, "All Cried Out" was re-recorded in two versions by German pop band No Angels. While a re-worked version with a contemporary pop edge was included on the re-release edition of the group's second album Now... Us! (2002), a re-arranged big band-played version was released on the band's first swing album, When the Angels Swing (2002). Both versions feature different vocals and arrangements, with Sandy Mölling singing main adlibs on the Pop version and Nadja Benaissa on the Big Band version.

=== Release and reception ===
Not yet recorded for any other No Angels project, a cover version of Moyet's "All Cried Out" was selected as the band's next single in fall 2002, serving as the lead single of their swing album When the Angels Swing (2002) as well as the Special Winter reissue of their second album Now... Us! (2002). Released by Cheyenne Records in German-speaking Europe on 2 December 2002, the maxi single included both the single versions as well as an Extended Version and When the Angels Swing album cut "Funk Dance," written by Thomas Anders, Christian Geller, and band member Lucy Diakovska, and produced by Mike Turtle, and Tom Jackson.

In Germany, "All Cried Out" debuted and peaked at number 18 on the German Singles Chart, becoming the band's lowest-charting single before their disbandment in 2003. It spent four weeks within the top twenty and fell out of the top 100 after its tenth week. Similarly, the song became the group's lowest-charting entry in Switzerland, where previous single "Let's Go to Bed" had failed to chart. It debuted at number 75 in the week of 22 November 2002, and peaked two weeks later at number 59. In Austria, "All Cried Out" debuted at number 42 on the Ö3 Austria Top 40. It reached its peak, number 23, in its fourth and fifth week on the chart and left the top 75 in its twelfth week.

=== Music videos ===
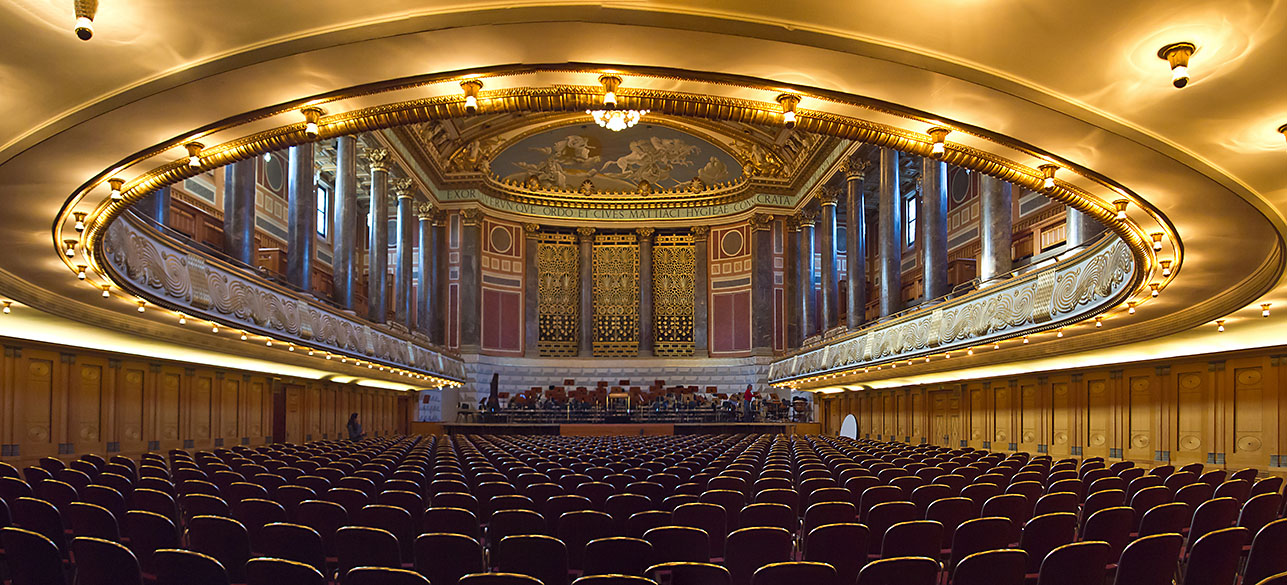
The music video for the Big Band Version at the Kurhaus Wiesbaden.

The music video for the Big Band Version of "All Cried Out" was directed by Christopher Häring and produced for DoRo Productions. It was filmed inside the Friedrich von Thiersch concert hall at the Kurhaus Wiesbaden in November 2002. A performance video, it features group shots as well individual shots of the band members on the parquet floor and the balcony of the central pillar-lined hall, wearing the floor-length satin gowns from their When the Angels Swing concert at the Berlin Tränenpalast. The video for the Pop Version was also directed by Häring and features group shots and individual shots of the group during the recording of the song, portraying them inside the recording booth.

=== Track listing ===
Maxi single
No.	Title	Writer(s)	Producer(s)	Length
1.	"All Cried Out" (Pop Version)	Steve Jolley; Alison Moyet; Tony Swain	Perky Park; Nik Hafemann	3:27
2.	"All Cried Out" (Big Band Version)	Jolley; Moyet; Swain	Perky Park	3:35
3.	"All Cried Out" (Extended Version)	Jolley; Moyet; Swain	Perky Park	4:56
4.	"Funky Dance"	Thomas Anders; Christian Geller; Lucy Diakovska	Mike Turtle; Tom Jackson	3:21

=== Credits and personnel ===
Credits adapted from the liner notes of When the Angels Swing.

Big Band Version

- Nadja Benaissa – vocals
- Dirk Decker – vocal recording
- Lucy Diakovska – vocals
- Nik Hafemann – executive producer
- Manfred Honetschläger – arranger, conductor
- Sandy Mölling – vocals
- Charly Morell – orchestra engineer
- Perky Park – production – Perky Park, Nik Hafemann
- Vanessa Petruo – vocals
- Jessica Wahls – vocals

Pop Version

- Nadja Benaissa – vocals
- Dirk Decker – vocal recording
- Lucy Diakovska – vocals
- Nik Hafemann – production, vocal arrangement
- Manfred Honetschläger – arranger, conductor
- Sandy Mölling – vocals
- Perky Park – production, mixing, recording
- Vanessa Petruo – vocals
- Jessica Wahls – vocals

=== Charts ===
Chart performance for "All Cried Out"
Chart (2002)	Peak position
Austria (Ö3 Austria Top 40)	23
Europe (Eurochart Hot 100)	69
Germany (GfK)	18
Switzerland (Schweizer Hitparade)	59
