= All I Ever Wanted: The Anthology =

Compilation album by Kirsty MacColl
- Released: 7 April 2014
- Length: 155:25
- Label: Salvo

Kirsty MacColl chronology
A New England: The Very Best of Kirsty MacColl (2013)	All I Ever Wanted: The Anthology (2014)

All I Ever Wanted: The Anthology is a two-disc compilation by the British singer and songwriter Kirsty MacColl, released by Salvo in 2014. The set contains 43 tracks from across MacColl's career and a 32-page booklet.

== Critical reception ==
Professional ratings
Review scores
Source	Rating
AllMusic	4/5 stars
The Independent	3/5 stars

Upon release, Mark Deming of AllMusic described MacColl's songwriting as "witty, disarmingly honest, eclectic, and adventurous", and added: "All I Ever Wanted is a suitably thorough and tremendously entertaining look at an artist who left behind a small but impressive legacy." The compilation was also included on AllMusic's "Favorite Compilations" list as part of their "Best of 2014". Andy Gill of The Independent considered MacColl "[the] most English of talents" and noted her "winning blend of strength and fragility, vocally and lyrically".

== Track listing ==
=== Disc one ===
No.	Title	Writer(s)	Length
1.	"Us Amazonians"	Kirsty MacColl, Pete Glenister	4:10
2.	"Days"	Ray Davies	3:00
3.	"Free World"	MacColl	2:37
4.	"Children of the Revolution"	MacColl, Johnny Marr	3:58
5.	"Walking Down Madison" (Ye Olde Original Mix)	MacColl, Marr	4:33
6.	"My Affair"	MacColl, Mark E. Nevin	5:24
7.	"In These Shoes?"	MacColl, Glenister, Willie Bobo, Melvin Lastie	3:39
8.	"They Don't Know"	MacColl	3:02
9.	"Terry" (12" version)	MacColl, Gavin Povey	5:15
10.	"Over You"	MacColl	2:35
11.	"Keep Your Hands Off My Baby"	Gerry Goffin, Carole King	2:59
12.	"Caroline"	MacColl	2:54
13.	"Touch Me"	MacColl, Glenister	3:35
14.	"Soho Square"	MacColl, Nevin	4:24
15.	"All I Ever Wanted" (Album version)	MacColl, Marshall Crenshaw	3:49
16.	"England 2 Colombia 0"	MacColl	3:45
17.	"Wrong Again"	MacColl	4:14
18.	"Don't Come the Cowboy with Me Sonny Jim!"	MacColl	3:47
19.	"Last Day of Summer"	MacColl, Nevin	4:20
20.	"Golden Heart"	MacColl, Neill MacColl	3:22
21.	"Bad"	MacColl	2:45

=== Disc two ===
No.	Title	Writer(s)	Length
1.	"There's a Guy Works Down the Chip Shop Swears He's Elvis"	MacColl, Philip Rambow	3:07
2.	"Mother's Ruin"	MacColl, Glenister	3:56
3.	"Shutting the Doors"	MacColl, Alan Lee Shaw	4:21
4.	"Queen of the High Teas"	MacColl	2:27
5.	"See That Girl"	MacColl	3:01
6.	"I'm Going Out with an Eighty Year Old Millionaire"	MacColl	2:50
7.	"Mambo de la Luna"	MacColl, Glenister, Dave Ruffy	4:36
8.	"Designer Life"	MacColl, Kenneth Crouch	2:34
9.	"Big Boy on a Saturday Night"	MacColl, Nevin	3:56
10.	"Titanic Days"	MacColl, Nevin	5:43
11.	"Can't Stop Killing You"	MacColl, Marr	4:11
12.	"Fairytale of New York" (with The Pogues)	Jem Finer, Shane MacGowan	4:31
13.	"Hard to Believe"	MacColl	2:19
14.	"You Just Haven't Earned It Yet, Baby"	Morrissey, Marr	2:48
15.	"A New England" (Live acoustic BBC session)	Billy Bragg	3:26
16.	"Halloween"	MacColl, Nevin	3:38
17.	"You and Me Baby"	MacColl, Marr	2:31
18.	"Angel" (Single mix)	MacColl	3:39
19.	"He's on the Beach" (Live acoustic BBC session)	MacColl, Povey	3:26
20.	"The End of a Perfect Day"	MacColl, Marr	3:21
21.	"Still Life"	MacColl, Rambow	2:58
22.	"Innocence" (Single mix)	MacColl, Glenister	4:00
