= One Blue Voice =

Video by Alison Moyet
- Released: September 2005 (UK); January 2006 (US)
- Recorded: 6 June 2005
- Venue: The Hospital Club in Covent Garden (London)
- Genre: Concert performance video
- Length: 130 minutes
- Label: Sanctuary Visual Entertainment
- Director: Martin R. Smith

One Blue Voice is a live concert video by the British singer Alison Moyet, released in 2005. It was filmed on 6 June 2005 at The Hospital Club in Covent Garden. The main feature contains 15 tracks, while DVD extras include four bonus tracks, an interview with Moyet and the promotional video for her 2003 single "More".

An audio-only edition of the entire One Blue Voice performance was included with the deluxe edition of Voice, released by Cooking Vinyl in 2015.

== Reception ==
In a review of the 2015 deluxe edition of Voice, Paul Scott-Bates of Louder Than War commented: "[Moyet] flawlessly zips through much of the album in front of an audience clearly watching one of the finest live performances they may ever have witnessed."

== Track listing ==
| No. | Title | Writer(s) | Length |
|---|---|---|---|
| 1. | "Satellite" | Alison Moyet, Pete Glenister |
| 2. | "Mary Don't Keep Me Waiting" | Moyet, Glenister |
| 3. | "Windmills of Your Mind" | Alan Bergman, Marilyn Bergman, Michel Legrand |
| 4. | "What Are You Doing the Rest of Your Life" | Bergman, Bergman, Legrand |
| 5. | "La Chanson Des Vieux Amants" | Jacques Brel |
| 6. | "Almost Blue" | Declan Macmanus |
| 7. | "If You Don't Come Back To Me" | Moyet, Glenister |
| 8. | "Cry Me a River" | Arthur Hamilton |
| 9. | "Wraggle Taggle Gypsies" | Traditional |
| 10. | "God Give Me Strength" | Burt Bacharach, Macmanus |
| 11. | "Dido's Lament" | Henry Purcell |
| 12. | "Momma Momma" | Melanie Safka |
| 13. | "Ski" | Moyet, B. Gray, David Ballard, Grant Clarke, John Lewis |
| 14. | "This House" | Moyet |
| 15. | "You Don't Have to Go" | Moyet, Glenister |

Bonus tracks
| No. | Title | Writer(s) | Length |
|---|---|---|---|
| 1. | "Alfie" | Bacharach, Hal David |
| 2. | "Only You" | Vince Clarke |
| 3. | "That Ole Devil Called Love" | Allan Roberts, Doris Fisher |
| 4. | "Should I Feel That It's Over" | Moyet, Glenister |

== Personnel ==
Band

- Alison Moyet - vocals
- Steve Corley - keyboards, musical director
- Mark Cox - guitar
- Julian Cox - bass
- Bob Knight - drums
- Gita Langley, Nina Cockburn - violins, backing vocals
- Kotonto Sato - viola, backing vocals
- Llinos Richards - cello, backing vocals

Production

- Pete Glenister - concert sound mixing
- John Simmons - lighting director
- Matthew Longfellow - editor
- Tessa Watts - executive producer
- Martin R. Smith - director, producer
- Bill Smith - director of "More" promotional video
- Bill & Ben Productions - Alison Moyet "Voice" Interview
- Nick Fiveash, Owen Denham - still photography
