= Tropical Brainstorm =

Studio album by Kirsty MacColl
- Released: 20 March 2000
- Recorded: 1999–2000
- Genres: Worldbeat; Latin pop; alternative rock
- Length: 49:10
- Label: V2 Records
- Producers: Kirsty MacColl, Pete Glenister and Dave Ruffy

Kirsty MacColl chronology
What Do Pretty Girls Do? (1998)	Tropical Brainstorm (2000)	The One and Only (2001)

Alternative cover
- US release cover

Tropical Brainstorm is the fifth studio album by Kirsty MacColl, released on 20 March 2000. It was the final album released during her lifetime. The material was inspired by her trips to Cuba, and several tracks feature Spanish or Portuguese lyrics. The album was released with three extra tracks in the US.

The album was released on vinyl for the first time in October 2021 for National Album Day.

== Composition and recording ==
MacColl stated that, in spite of the role Cuban music played in inspiring her songwriting, her goal was not "to recreate an authentic sound", offering two reasons: "first of all cos I'm not Celia Cruz, and a lot of people like my music mostly because of the lyrics. I didn't want to try and fail at being the Buena Vista Social Club. I wanted to succeed at being Kirsty MacColl". MacColl had previously shown an interest in Cuban culture, as when she wore a Castro hat and smoked a Cuban cigar on the inside cover of her 1995 greatest hits collection; she also spent time in both Cuba and Brazil, took Spanish classes, and began attending Cuba Solidarity Campaign shows.

"Good for Me", a non-album track co-written with James Knight, was her last song.

== Commercial performance ==
Despite the apparent success of the album (certified Gold in the UK), the V2 label dropped MacColl before her death in 2000.

== Singles ==
Preceding the release of Tropical Brainstorm, "Mambo de la Luna" was issued as a single in November 1999, followed by "In These Shoes?" in February 2000. They reached number 89 and number 81 respectively in the UK Singles Chart. A further two tracks were issued as promotional singles, "England 2 Colombia 0" and "Treachery".

== Critical reception ==
Professional ratings
Review scores
Source	Rating
AllMusic	4.5/5 stars
Robert Christgau	A−
Entertainment Weekly	A
The Guardian	4/5 stars

On its release, Neil Spencer of The Observer described the mix of MacColl's "acerbic lyricism" and the "sensuous mundo Latino" music as a "winner". Caroline Sullivan of The Guardian felt the album successfully adopted "Latin textures" and an "Anglo-Hispanic" sound with "minimal damage" to MacColl's credibility and added, "The vivid colours of her new musical palette, with its upfront brass and percussion, provide the life her tunes hitherto lacked – even her deadpan voice has blossomed into expressiveness." Clark Collis of The Daily Telegraph praised the return of "one of our most undervalued vocal talents" and commented that "MacColl has clearly put [recent] years to good use by immersing herself in the Latin stylings that burst from every track here".

Neil McKay of Sunday Life felt Tropical Brainstorm was unlikely to change MacColl's status as a "fine songwriter who's managed to dip under the radar of public acclaim", but noted it was "a cracking good pop record" which is "bursting with Brazilian and Cuban rhythms" and "witty and wise lyrics". Linda Higgins of the Evening Herald described the album as a collection of "languid and swirling pop tunes [which] deserves to be a commercial hit". She praised MacColl's "sardonic" lyrics for being "as sharp as ever" and considered the material to "showcase MacColl's somewhat demure vocals properly" unlike some of her previous work.

== Track listing ==
1. "Mambo de la Luna" (Kirsty MacColl, Pete Glenister, Dave Ruffy) – 4:38
2. "In These Shoes?" (MacColl, Glenister) – 3:39^{2}
3. "Treachery" (MacColl, Graham Gouldman) – 3:51
4. "Here Comes That Man Again" (MacColl, Glenister) – 4:49
5. "Autumngirlsoup" (MacColl) – 3:54
6. "Celestine" (MacColl) – 3:35
7. "England 2 Colombia 0" (MacColl) – 3:45
8. "Não Esperando" (MacColl, Glenister) – 4:04
9. "Alegria" (MacColl, Ruffy) – 2:01
10. "Us Amazonians" (MacColl, Glenister) – 4:09
11. "Wrong Again" (MacColl) – 4:16
12. "Designer Life" (MacColl, Kenneth Crouch) – 2:35
13. "Head" (MacColl) – 3:56
14. "Golden Heart" (MacColl, Neill MacColl) – 3:24^{1}
15. "Things Happen" (MacColl, Gouldman) – 2:58^{1}
16. "Good For Me" (MacColl, James Knight) – 4:10^{1}

^{1}On US release only.

^{2}Used as the theme for the BBC1 comedy series Any Time Now, and as the theme and bridging music for The Catherine Tate Show (first series). A cover of this appears on Bette Midler's album Bette.

== Personnel ==
- Kirsty MacColl – vocals, autoharp, lap steel guitar
- Roy Dodds – percussion
- Pete Glenister – guitar, programming
- Chucho Merchán – bass, double bass on "Designer Life"
- Dave Ruffy – drums, programming
- Bosco DeOliveira – percussion
- Joseph de Jesus – trombone on "Celestine"
- Ernesto Estruch – piano, violin, background vocals
- Felix Gonzalez – background vocals, Cuban rap on "Mambo de la Luna"
- Omar Puente – violin, background vocals
- James Knight – saxophone on "Head"
- Ben Storey – trumpet on "In these Shoes?"
- Lee Groves – additional programming
- Mark Hinton Stewart – keyboards on "Designer Life"
- Luiz de Almeida – surdo on "Não Esperando", nylon string guitar on "Não Esperando" & "Designer Life"

== Charts ==
Chart (2000)	Peak position
Scottish Albums (Official Charts)	82
UK Albums Chart	39
UK Independent Albums Chart	4

Chart (2021)	Peak position
Scottish Albums Chart	49
UK Vinyl Albums Chart	18
UK Physical Albums Chart	41
UK Album Sales Chart	46

Chart (2024)	Peak position
UK Albums Downloads	50

== Certifications ==
Region	Certification	Certified units/sales
United Kingdom (BPI)	Gold	100,000^{^}
^{^} Shipments figures based on certification alone.
