= More (Alison Moyet song) =

Single by Alison Moyet

from the album Hometime
- B-side: "If You Don't Come Back To Me (Live), Should I Feel That It's Over (Live)"
- Released: 3 March 2003
- Length: 3:59
- Label: Sanctuary Records
- Songwriters: Alison Moyet, Pete Glenister
- Producer: The Insects

Alison Moyet singles chronology
"Do You Ever Wonder" (2002)	"More" (2003)	"Almost Blue" (2004)

"More" is a song by English singer Alison Moyet, which was released in 2003 as the third and final single from her fifth studio album Hometime. It was written by Moyet and Pete Glenister, and produced by Tim Norfolk and Bob Locke under the name The Insects.

Like the two previous singles from Hometime, the single failed to enter the UK Top 100, but did enter the Top 200, peaking at #127.

Unlike the two previous singles, a promotional video was filmed for the single.

The single's two B-Sides are "If You Don't Come Back To Me (Live)" and "Should I Feel That It's Over (Live)", which were both songs from Hometime, recorded live in October 2002. The B-Sides were exclusive to the single.

== Critical reception ==
In a review of Hometime, Andy Stevens of the Press & Sun-Bulletin commented: "...still, Hometime is not devoid of sexiness, nor sass. Track 3 for example ("More") gives us a longing Moyet, smokily growling over lost love opportunities." Reviewing the 2016 deluxe edition of the album, Paul Scott-Bates of Louder Than War said the song was "perhaps the album highlight". He stated: "...like it or not, Alison gave one of her most sensual moments in a track that oozes lust and sexuality. With a performance nothing short of perfect, it remains stunning to this day."

== Formats ==
CD single (UK release)

1. "More" – 3:59
2. "If You Don't Come Back To Me (Live)" – 4:43
3. "Should I Feel That It's Over (Live)" – 4:01

== Chart performance ==
Chart (2003)	Peak position
UK Singles Chart	127

== Personnel ==
- Photography – Paul Cox
- Mixed By – Tim Norfolk, Bob Locke (The Insects)
- Producer – Tim Norfolk, Bob Locke (The Insects)
