= One More Time (Alison Moyet song) =

Single by Alison Moyet

from the album The Turn
- B-side: "Fool, Reconsider Me" "Momma Momma"
- Released: 2007
- Length: 4:00
- Label: W14 Music
- Songwriters: Alison Moyet; Pete Glenister
- Producer: Pete Glenister

Alison Moyet singles chronology
"Almost Blue"/"Alfie" (2004)	"One More Time" (2007)	"A Guy Like You" (2007)

"One More Time" is a song by English singer Alison Moyet, which was released in 2007 as the lead single from her seventh studio album The Turn. It was written by Moyet and Pete Glenister, and produced by Glenister. The song reached No. 151 in the UK. A music video was filmed to promote the single. It was shot at the Hackney Empire in the London Borough of Hackney and directed by Alexander Hemming.

Speaking to Len Righi of The Morning Call, Moyet said of the song's lyrics: "That's what relationships become after many, many years, when you recognise there's no more maneuvering with either of you and it's about dealing with the ennui."

== Reception ==
In a review of The Turn, Chris Long of the BBC commented: "The heartbreak of "One More Time" and the off-kilter splendour of "The Sharpest Corner (Hollow)" are worthy additions to her canon. John Murphy of musicOMH considered the song "promising" and one which "soars through the octaves on the wings of a rather beautiful guitar riff". Terry Staunton of Record Collector felt the song, along with "Anytime At All" "soar[s] with elaborate orchestrations", adding that "their ambition and energy almost explod[e] beyond the confines of a CD".

Q described the song as a "big bluesy ballad". Steve Jelbert of The Times felt Moyet's voice was "reminiscent" of David Bowie on "big, soft tunes such as "One More Time". Cheryl Arrighie of 33rpm.com considered the song to be a "cracking lead single" and one which "kicks the album off strongly". Billboard noted the "smart sophisticate" of the song.

Pink Paper considered the song "dramatic" and "a plea to give things another go". A. D. Amorosi of The Dispatch described "One More Time" as a "grandly emotive love song". In a review of the 2015 deluxe edition, Paul Scott-Bates of Louder Than War noted: "The Turn boasted an incredible depth of material where she poured out quite superb performances. "One More Time" was one such piece rising and soaring like the phoenix that she had become."

== Formats ==
CD single

1. "One More Time" – 4:00
2. "Fool, Reconsider Me" – 3:21
3. "Momma Momma" – 4:41

CD single (promo)

1. "One More Time" – 4:00

== Personnel ==
- Alison Moyet – vocals
- Pete Glenister – guitar, keyboards
- London Session Orchestra (LSO) – performer
- David Daniels – cello
- Bruce White, Warren Zielinski – viola
- Boguslan Kostecki, Patrick Kiernan – violin
- Perry Montague-Mason – violin, leader (LSO)
- Simon Hale – conductor, arrangement
- Malcolm Moore – bass
- David Ballard – drums

Production

- Pete Glenister – producer, programming, mixing, engineer
- Phil Da Costa – mixing, engineer
- Dick Beetham – mastering

== Charts ==
Chart (2007)	Peak position
UK Singles Chart	151
