= Voice (Alison Moyet album) =

Studio album by Alison Moyet
- Released: 6 September 2004
- Genre: Pop; jazz; classical crossover
- Length: 43:42
- Label: Sanctuary
- Producer: Anne Dudley

Alison Moyet chronology
Hometime (2002)	Voice (2004)	The Turn (2007)

Singles from Voice
- 1. "Windmills of Your Mind" Released: August 2004; 2. "Almost Blue/Alfie" Released: December 2004

Professional ratings
Review scores
Source	Rating
AllMusic	3.5/5 stars
The Guardian	Favourable
musicOMH	Mixed
PopMatters	4/10
Rolling Stone	4/5 stars

Voice is the sixth solo studio album by English singer Alison Moyet, released by Sanctuary Records on 6 September 2004 in the United Kingdom and on 12 October 2004 in the United States. It is a covers album, featuring slow-tempo, classic songs from a number of different genres, designed to showcase the singer's voice, with orchestral backing.

A deluxe edition of Voice was released by Cooking Vinyl on 2 October 2015.

== Background ==
After a performance with the BBC Concert Orchestra in 2003, Moyet approached conductor Anne Dudley with the idea of recording a "collection of classic song". In light of her appreciation of Moyet's distinctive vocal style, Dudley later described the offer of working with her as "irresistible". For her official website, she commented: "We spent many happy hours playing songs on the piano, minutely adjusting keys to suit her voice. We chose a wonderful selection and recorded them organically." The material was recorded at Angel Studios, London, with Dudley as producer and arranger.

Voice was released in September 2004 and reached No. 7 in the UK, spending 12 weeks on the chart. Preceding the album was the single "Windmills of Your Mind", which failed to make a chart appearance. The second and final single, released in December 2004, was a double release of "Almost Blue" and "Alfie". It reached No. 99 in the UK.

Speaking to the BBC News in 2004, Moyet commented: "As a 43-year-old I'm finding that reflective, beautiful songs appeal to me. I am quite a prolific singer, in the sense that I have a versatility and I don't want to be limited purely to the songs that I can write."

== Track listing ==
No.	Title	Writer(s)	Length
1.	"Windmills of Your Mind"	Alan Bergman, Marilyn Bergman, Michel Legrand	3:50
2.	"The Man I Love"	George Gershwin, Ira Gershwin	3:48
3.	"Almost Blue"	Declan Macmanus	3:52
4.	"Je crois entendre encore"	Georges Bizet	3:29
5.	"What Are You Doing the Rest of Your Life?"	Bergman, Bergman, Legrand	3:14
6.	"God Give Me Strength"	Bacharach, Macmanus	5:35
7.	"The Wraggle-Taggle Gypsies-O!"	Traditional	3:29
8.	"Dido's Lament: When I Am Laid in Earth"	Henry Purcell	3:20
9.	"La Chanson des vieux amants"	Jacques Brel	5:07
10.	"Cry Me a River"	Arthur Hamilton	5:38
11.	"Bye Bye Blackbird"	Mort Dixon, Ray Henderson	3:01

European, US and South Korean editions bonus track
No.	Title	Writer(s)	Length
12.	"Alfie"	Bacharach, Hal David	2:57

2015 deluxe edition bonus disc: One Blue Voice Live
No.	Title	Writer(s)	Length
1.	"Satellite"	Moyet, Glenister	4:40
2.	"Mary, Don't Keep me Waiting"	Moyet, Glenister	3:42
3.	"Windmills of Your Mind"		4:02
4.	"What Are You Doing the Rest of Your Life?"		3:25
5.	"La Chanson des vieux amants"		5:29
6.	"Almost Blue"		3:47
7.	"If You Don't Come Back to Me"	Moyet, Glenister	4:59
8.	"Cry Me a River"		4:45
9.	"The Wraggle Taggle Gypsies-O!"		3:49
10.	"God Give Me Strength"		5:24
11.	"Dido's Lament: When I Am Laid in Earth"		3:51
12.	"Momma Momma"	Melanie Safka	4:45
13.	"Ski"	Moyet, Ballard, Clark, Lewis, Gray	4:41
14.	"This House"	Moyet	3:58
15.	"You Don't Have to Go"	Moyet, Glenister	4:51
16.	"Alfie"		3:18
17.	"Only You"	Vince Clarke	3:05
18.	"That Ole Devil Called Love"	Allan Roberts, Doris Fisher	3:01
19.	"Should I Feel That It's Over"	Moyet, Glenister	3:56

== Personnel ==
=== Musicians ===
- Alison Moyet – lead vocals
- Anthony Pleeth – cello (tracks: 1 to 9, 11)
- Dave Daniels – cello (tracks: 6, 7, 9)
- Martin Loveday – cello (tracks: 6, 7, 9)
- Paul Kegg – cello (tracks: 1, 2, 4, 6 to 9)
- Nicholas Bucknall – clarinet (tracks: 1, 4, 11)
- Chris Laurence – double bass (tracks: 1, 2, 4 to 9)
- Ralph Salmins – drums (tracks: 2, 3, 5 to 7, 10)
- John Parricelli – guitar (tracks: 2, 4 to 7, 10)
- Anne Dudley – piano (tracks: 1 to 7, 9 to 10), electric piano (tracks: 2, 5), glockenspiel (track: 4), organ (track: 6)
- Derek Watkins – trumpet (tracks: 3, 6, 10)
- Andy Parker – viola (tracks: 6, 7, 9)
- Bruce White – viola (tracks: 1, 2, 4, 6 to 9)
- Peter Lale – viola (tracks: 1 to 9, 11)
- Vicci Wardman – viola (tracks: 1, 2, 4, 6, to 9)
- Boguslaw Kostecki – violin (tracks: 1, 2, 4, 6 to 9)
- Gordon Buchan – violin (tracks: 6, 7, 9)
- John Bradbury – violin (tracks: 6, 7, 9)
- Julian Leaper – violin (tracks: 1, 2, 4, 6 to 9)
- Maciej Rakowski – violin (tracks: 6, 7, 9)
- Patrick Kiernan – violin (tracks: 6, 7, 9)
- Paul Willey – violin (tracks: 6, 7, 9)
- Rita Manning – violin (tracks: 1, 2, 4, 6 to 9)
- Roger Garland – violin (tracks: 1, 2, 4 to 9, 11)
- Rolf Wilson – violin (tracks: 1 to 8)
- Simon Baggs – violin (tracks: 6, 7, 9)
- Rolf Wilson – violin (leader) (tracks: 1, 2, 4, 6 to 9)
- Derek Watkins – flugelhorn (tracks: 2, 6)
- Alasdair Malloy – harmonica (glass), percussion (track: 8)
- Victoria Walpole – Cor Anglais (track: 4)
- Alasdair Mallory – marimba (track: 4)
- Steve Pearce – bass (track: 6)
- Jamie Talbot – saxophone (tracks: 6, 10)
- Julian Jackson – harmonica (track: 10)

=== Production ===
- Anne Dudley – producer, arranger
- Mat Bartram – sound engineer
- Steve Price – sound engineer
- Roger Dudley – sound engineer, sound mixing

== Charts ==
Chart performance for Voice
Chart (2004)	Peak position
Dutch Albums (Album Top 100)	76
Irish Albums (IRMA)	53
Scottish Albums (OCC)	8
UK Albums (OCC)	7
UK Independent Albums (OCC)	6
