= Bette (album) =

Studio album by Bette Midler
- Released: October 10, 2000
- Studio: Cello Studios (Hollywood, CA); Chung King Studios (New York, NY); Record Plant (Hollywood, CA); Sony Music Studios (New York, NY)
- Length: 47:40
- Label: Warner Bros.
- Producer: Rick Nowels; Marc Shaiman; Don Was

Bette Midler chronology
Bathhouse Betty (1998)	Bette (2000)	Sings the Rosemary Clooney Songbook (2003)

Singles from Bette
- 1. "Nobody Else but You"; 2. "In These Shoes"

Bette is a self-titled studio album by American singer Bette Midler. It was released by Warner Bros. Records on October 10, 2000, in the United States to coincide with the premiere of her self-titled CBS sitcom. Midler covered songs on this album written by artists like Elvis Costello and Kirsty MacColl, mixed with cover versions of classic soul and R&B songs from the 1970s, including "Shining Star", "Love T.K.O." and "Just My Imagination (Running Away with Me)".

Upon release, the album only reached number 69 on US Billboard 200, and Warner Bros. subsequently dropped Midler from its roster in 2001 because of declining record sales. A maxi-single with several remixes of "In These Shoes" was released to promote the album. It reached number eight on the US Billboard Dance Music/Club Play Singles and number 14 on the Hot Dance Music/Maxi-Singles Sales charts.

== Critical reception ==
Professional ratings
Aggregate scores
Source	Rating
Metacritic	73/100
Review scores
Source	Rating
AllMusic	4/5 stars
Robert Christgau	(choice cut)
Entertainment Weekly	C
Rolling Stone	3.5/5 stars
The Rolling Stone Album Guide	2.5/5 stars
Wall of Sound	74/100

AllMusic editor William Ruhlmann rated the album four out of five stars and called Bette "an excellent album to tie in with the premiere of her network television show. [Producer Don] Was seems to conceive of Midler as a kind of pre-rock, neo-Brill Building performer, frequently putting her into mid-tempo pop arrangements of old R&B ballads [...] Fans of the bawdy Bette and the bathetic Bette may be disappointed, but the rest of her followers will enjoy the balance and consistency of this collection." Richard Abowitz, writing for Rolling Stone, noted that Bette "finds Midler backed by her touring band, working ballads and vamps with a distinctive style perfected over decades of performing. Midler's secret weapon has always been her ability to pick material, and Bette is no exception."

== Chart performance ==
Bette debuted and peaked at number 69 on the US Billboard 200. This marked Midler's lowest-charting album by then, resulting into Warner Bros. subsequently dropping her from its roster in 2001 because of declining record sales. By October 2003, the album had sold 226,000 copies in the United States, according to Nielsen SoundScan.

== Track listing ==
Bette track listing
No.	Title	Writer(s)	Producer(s)	Length
1.	"That's How Heartaches Are Made"	Ben Raleigh; Bob Halley	Don Was	3:08
2.	"In These Shoes"	Kirsty MacColl; Pete Glenister	Was	3:41
3.	"God Give Me Strength"	Elvis Costello; Burt Bacharach	Was	6:31
4.	"Just My Imagination (Running Away with Me)"	Norman Whitfield; Barrett Strong	Was	3:54
5.	"Love T.K.O."	Cecil Womack; Gip Noble, Jr.; Linda Womack	Was	4:47
6.	"Moses"	Patty Griffin	Was	4:31
7.	"Nobody Else but You"	Bette Midler; Marc Shaiman	Was; Shaiman	2:53
8.	"Color of Roses"	Beth Nielsen Chapman; Matt Rollings	Was	4:41
9.	"Bless You Child"	Billy Steinberg; Rick Nowels; Marie-Claire Cremers	Was; Nowels	4:12
10.	"When Your Life Was Low"	Will Jennings; Joe Sample	Was	3:55
11.	"Shining Star"	Leo Graham Jr.; Paul Richmond	Was	4:49

== Personnel ==
- Produced by Don Was
- Recorded and mixed by Ed Cherney
- "Bless You Child" produced by Don Was and Rick Nowels
- "Nobody Else but You" (from the Columbia TriStar Television series Bette) produced by Marc Shaiman and Don Was Band
- Drums – Sonny Emory
- Bass – Reggie Hamilton
- Piano, Fender Rhodes, B3 – Bobby Lyle
- Keyboards, piano – Larry Cohn
- Guitar – Mike Miller
- Guitar – Dwight Sills
- Percussion – Lenny Castro

Additional musicians:

- Drums – James Gadson
- Bass – Abraham Laboriel
- Guitar – Mark Goldenberg, Paul Jackson Jr., Prince Eyango, Tim Pierce, Dean Parks
- Keyboards – Jamie Muhoberac, Rick Nowels, Greg Kurstin, Marc Shaiman
- Trumpet – Mark Isham, Darrell Leonard, Jerry Hey, Gary Grant
- Tenor saxophone – Plas Johnson, Joe Sublett, Dan Higgins, Jerry Vivino
- Baritone saxophone – Gary Herbig
- Trombone – Eric M. Jorgensen
- "Bless You Child" programming – Charles Judge, Wayne Rodrigues
- Background singers – Hilard "Sweet Pea" Atkinson, Cynthia Bass, Harry Bowens, Carlos Cuevas, Donna De Lory, Cleto Escobedo II, David Lasley, Mirley Espinoza, Nikki Harris, Don McCrary, Howard McCrary, Leon McCrary, Arnold McCuller, Esther Nicholson, Martin Padilla, Melanie Taylor, Maria Vidal
- "Nobody Else but You" arranged by Marc Shaiman and Jimmy Vivino
- Project coordinator and contractor – Shari Sutcliffe
- Assistant to Don Was: Jane Oppenhemier
- Recorded at Cello Studios in Hollywood, CA; Chung King in New York, NY; Record Plant in Hollywood, CA and Sony Music Studios in New York, NY
- Mixed at Record Plant in Hollywood, CA
- "Nobody Else but You" mixed at Sony Music Studios in New York, NY
- Assistant engineers – Alan Sanderson, Elliott Blakey, Dave Ashton, Alex Olsson, Katie Teasdale, Tulio Torrinello Jr. and Andy Manganello
- Mastered by Doug Sax at The Mastering Lab in Hollywood, CA
- Mark Isham appears countesy of Columbia Records
- Art direction and design – Linda Cobb
- Photography – Greg Gorman (cover) and Norman Jean Roy
- Hair – Robert Ramos
- Make-up – Eugenia Weston
- Stylists – Michael Eisenhower, Bob Sparkman

== Charts ==
Chart performance for Bette
Chart (2000)	Peak position
US Billboard 200	69
