= A Guy Like You (Alison Moyet song) =

Single by Alison Moyet

from the album The Turn
- Released: 26 November 2007
- Length: 4:19
- Label: W14 Music
- Songwriters: Alison Moyet; Pete Glenister
- Producer: Pete Glenister

Alison Moyet singles chronology
"One More Time" (2007)	"A Guy Like You" (2007)	"When I Was Your Girl" (2013)

"A Guy Like You" is a song by English singer Alison Moyet, released in 2007 as the second and final single from her seventh studio album, The Turn (2007). It was written by Moyet and Pete Glenister, and produced by Glenister. Remixes were produced by Jeremy Wheatley, Soul Avengerz and Almighty Associates.

== Background ==
"A Guy Like You" was recorded during the sessions for The Turn, but was not originally intended for the album as Moyet felt it did not fit the album's overall theme. Moyet told PopMatters in 2008: "I wanted to write a song like 'A Guy Like You' because I wanted to illustrate that I don't do pop at the moment, not because I can't or because I haven't got an ear for it. It's just not particularly what I was doing." She told Len Righi of The Morning Call: "Over the years people have tried to push me in certain directions, to be poptastic, which I have resisted. So 'A Guy Like You' is a bit of self-indulgence, to show people that yes, I can write pop."

Owing to W14 Music's fondness of the track, "A Guy Like You" was ultimately included as a bonus track on The Turn. Moyet told PopMatters: "In an ideal world, it wouldn't really have been on the album. As much as I like it, it's an oddity compared with the other songs."

== Promotion ==
A music video was filmed to promote the single. Moyet also appeared on both The Graham Norton Show and The One Show to promote its release. She performed the song live on Norton's show.

== Critical reception ==
In a review of The Turn, Billboard felt the album "proffers all sides of the singer/songwriter's persona", including "dance siren" on "A Guy Like You". Dan MacIntosh of PopMatters described the song as one which "sounds more like spicy '70s soul" in comparison to much of The Turn." Jack Foley of IndieLondon noted the song "embraces some brighter, livelier, soulful qualities". A.D. Amorosi of The Philadelphia Inquirer described the song as "zippy pop".

Cheryl Arrighie of 33rpm.com described the song as "trademark Alison Moyet" and "delivered with the passion that you would expect from one of the best female artists that England has ever produced". Female First considered the song "joyous and uplifting" with a "big ballsy arrangement", "unforgettable violin hook" and "playful lyrics". Len Righi of The Morning Call felt the song as a "full, orchestrated Nona Hendryx-style soul-pop hit in waiting." Aidin Vaziri of the SFGate was critical of the song, commenting: "It's only a dismal, by-the-numbers attempt at modern disco on "A Guy Like You" that genuinely makes one long for the plink-plonk simplicity of [Yazoo's] classic "Nobody's Diary."

== Formats ==
CD single

1. "A Guy Like You" (Jeremy Wheatley Radio Edit) – 3:30
2. "A Guy Like You" (Soul Avengerz Main Mix) – 6:56
3. "A Guy Like You" (Almighty Anthem Club Mix) – 6:53

CD single (promo)

1. "A Guy Like You" (Jeremy Wheatley Radio Edit) – 3:30

CD single (Almighty Mixes promo)

1. "A Guy Like You" (Almighty Anthem Radio Edit) – 3:31
2. "A Guy Like You" (Almighty 12" Anthem Mix) – 6:54
3. "A Guy Like You" (Almighty 12" Anthem Dub) – 6:35
4. "A Guy Like You" (Almighty 12" Anthem Instrumental) – 6:51

CD single (Soul Avengerz Mixes promo)

1. "A Guy Like You" (Soul Avengerz Main Mix) – 6:58
2. "A Guy Like You" (Soul Avengerz Long Instrumental) – 7:01

== Personnel ==
- Alison Moyet – vocals
- Pete Glenister – guitar

Production

- Pete Glenister – producer, programming, mixing, engineer
- Phil Da Costa – mixing, engineer
- Dick Beetham – mastering
- Jeremy Wheatley – remix, mixing
- Richard Edgeler – assistant mixing on "Jeremy Wheatley Radio Edit"
- Paul Gardiner, Wayne O'Connell, James Reynolds (Soul Avengerz) – remixes and additional production
- Almighty Associates – remixes and additional production

== Charts ==
Chart (2007)	Peak position
UK Physical Singles (OCC)	40
