= Wishing You Were Here (Alison Moyet song) =

Single by Alison Moyet

from the album Hoodoo
- B-side: "Back Where I Belong"
- Released: 20 May 1991
- Genre: Pop; rock
- Length: 3:55
- Label: Columbia; Sony Music
- Songwriters: Alison Moyet; Pete Glenister
- Producer: Pete Glenister

Alison Moyet singles chronology
"It Won't Be Long" (1991)	"Wishing You Were Here" (1991)	"This House" (1991)

"Wishing You Were Here" is a song by British singer-songwriter Alison Moyet, released in 1991 as the second single from her third studio album, Hoodoo (1991). It was written by Moyet and Pete Glenister, and produced by Glenister. Kirsty MacColl provided backing vocals on the song.

== Background ==
Having recording her second studio album Raindancing while living in Los Angeles, Moyet returned to live in England after completing a world tour. Moyet's record company, CBS, wanted her to continue producing pop hits but this left the singer feeling artistically compromised and under pressure to deliver. During the period after returning to England, Moyet began a songwriting partnership with Pete Glenister, who had been Moyet's guitarist for part of the Raindancing tour. Keen to have more artistic freedom, she suggested to CBS that Glenister should produce her. Muff Winwood of the label's A&R division granted Moyet permission to record the album she wanted to, with Hoodoo being released in April 1991.

"Wishing You Were Here" was the second single from Hoodoo, released in May 1991. Like the previous single, "It Won't Be Long", "Wishing You Were Here" was met with limited commercial success, failing to enter the UK Top 40. It peaked at No. 72, remaining in the Top 100 for the one week.

== Release ==
"Wishing You Were Here" was released by Columbia on 7" vinyl, 12" vinyl, cassette and CD. It was released in the UK and across Europe, as well as Australia. The B-side, "Back Where I Belong", was taken from the Hoodoo album. On the 12" vinyl and CD versions of the single, two remixes of "Back Where I Belong" were included; the "Polite Mix" and the "Soft Mix".

== Critical reception ==
Upon its release as a single, Music & Media felt "Wishing You Were Here" "has the charm of a French chanson" where "Moyet's warm voice covers the wall of acoustic guitars and tasteful percussion". Terry Staunton of New Musical Express was critical, describing it as "faceless, soulless, unintelligent pop". He added that Moyet's voice "deserves much better" and that she had not had "much in the way of decent material" since Yazoo except for the "occasional [solo] single early on".

In a review of Hoodoo, American magazine People commented, "When she sings with minimal acoustic backing, as on 'This House' or 'Wishing You Were Here,' she showcases her gifts best." Tom Demalon of AllMusic retrospectively noted, "She hasn't lost her knack for breezy, adult pop, evident on the lilting, melodic 'Wishing You Were Here' and 'It Won't Be Long'." Classic Pop picked the song as a highlight on Hoodoo in a 2015 retrospective of Moyet's career. Adrian Janes of Penny Black Music praised it in comparison to "This House". He felt "This House" was "disrupted by drums and a big, emotive chorus", resulting in a "feeling of it all being a bit overwrought". In comparison, he felt that the "plaintive singing, over brushed drums and strings" of "Wishing You Were Here" "strike deeper into the heart."

== Formats ==
- 7" single
1. "Wishing You Were Here" - 3:55
2. "Back Where I Belong" - 3:52
- 12" single
1. "Wishing You Were Here" - 3:55
2. "Back Where I Belong" - 3:52
3. "Back Where I Belong (Polite Mix)" - 5:26
4. "Back Where I Belong (Soft Mix)" - 5:31
- Cassette single
1. "Wishing You Were Here" - 3:55
2. "Back Where I Belong" - 3:52
- CD single
1. "Wishing You Were Here" - 3:55
2. "Back Where I Belong" - 3:52
3. "Back Where I Belong (Polite Mix)" - 5:26
4. "Back Where I Belong (Soft Mix)" - 5:31

== Personnel ==
- Alison Moyet – lead vocals, backing vocals, backing vocal arrangement
- Pete Glenister – guitar on "Wishing You Were Here"
- Bob Andrews – keyboards on "Wishing You Were Here"
- Neil Conti – drums on "Wishing You Were Here"
- Kirsty MacColl – Elysian chorus on "Wishing You Were Here"
- Ben Watkins – noises on "Wishing You Were Here"
- Andy Cox – guitar on "Back Where I Belong"
- David Steele – bass on "Back Where I Belong"
- Reggae Philharmonic Orchestra – strings on "Back Where I Belong"
- Michelle Cross, Deborah Lewis – backing vocals on "Back Where I Belong"

Production

- Pete Glenister – producer and programming on "Wishing You Were Here"
- Alison Moyet – programming on "Wishing You Were Here"
- Bob Andrews – programming on "Wishing You Were Here"
- Martin Rex, Neil Brockbank – engineers on "Wishing You Were Here"
- Steve Lillywhite – mixing on "Wishing You Were Here"
- Andy Cox, David Steele – producers, mixing and programming on "Back Where I Belong"
- Dave Anderson – engineer on "Back Where I Belong"
- Ben Chapman – remixes of "Back Where I Belong"

Other

- The Douglas Brothers – photography
- DKB, London – design

== Charts ==
Chart (1991)	Peak position
Australia (ARIA)	197
UK Singles (OCC)	72
UK Airplay (Music Week)	42
