= Do You Ever Wonder =

Single by Alison Moyet

from the album Hometime
- B-side: "Yesterday's Flame (Insects Remix), Bilan"
- Released: 11 November 2002
- Length: 3:10
- Label: Sanctuary Records
- Songwriter: Carlton McCarthy
- Producer: The Insects

Alison Moyet singles chronology
"Should I Feel That It's Over" (2002)	"Do You Ever Wonder" (2002)	"More" (2002)

"Do You Ever Wonder" is a song by English singer Alison Moyet, released in 2002 as the second single from her fifth studio album Hometime. It was written by Carlton McCarthy, and produced by Tim Norfolk and Bob Locke under the name The Insects.

Like Hometime's lead single, "Should I Feel That It's Over", "Do You Ever Wonder" failed to enter the UK Top 100, however it did enter the Top 200, faring better than its predecessor. It peaked at No. 113.

No promotional video was filmed for the single, however Moyet did perform the song on the Jools Holland show along with "Should I Feel That It's Over". During her appearance on the show, Moyet spoke of the song in the interview segment, saying she liked the song for the "'60s bend to it".

The single's two B-Sides are "Yesterday's Flame (Insects Remix)" and "Bilan". The former is a remix of the opening track from Hometime, while "Bilan" is a French version of the Hometime track "More". "Bilan" was included on certain editions of Hometime.

== Critical reception ==
In a review of Hometime, Billboard called the song "single-worthy", adding that it would "likely have many listeners rediscovering vintage Dionne Warwick recordings". Ken Foster of Salon described the song as "flabbergasting", adding that it "begins with expertly phrased bursts of falsetto patter before breaking into a chorus worthy of Al Green." In a 2015 retrospective on Moyet's career, Classic Pop included the song as one of twenty favourites as chosen by the magazine. They commented: "Operator, get us Cubby Broccoli!"

== Formats ==
CD single (UK release)

1. "Do You Ever Wonder" - 3:10
2. "Yesterday's Flame (Insects Remix)" - 4:48
3. "Bilan" - 4:00

== Chart performance ==
Chart (2002)	Peak position
UK Singles Chart	113

== Personnel ==
- Artwork Design – E-Xentric Thinking
- Photography – Paul Cox
- Producer – Tim Norfolk, Bob Locke (The Insects)
- Remixers on "Yesterday's Flame" (Imsects Remix) - Tim Norfolk, Bob Locke (The Insects)
