= In These Shoes? =

2000 single by Kirsty MacColl

Single by Kirsty MacColl

from the album Tropical Brainstorm
- Released: 13 March 2000
- Length: 3:39
- Label: V2
- Songwriters: Kirsty MacColl; Pete Glenister; Willie Bobo; Melvin Lastie
- Producers: Kirsty MacColl; Pete Glenister; Dave Ruffy

Kirsty MacColl singles chronology
"Mambo de la Luna" (1999)	"In These Shoes?" (2000)	"Sun On the Water" (2005)

Official audio
- "In These Shoes?" on YouTube

"In These Shoes?" is a song by British singer and songwriter Kirsty MacColl, released by V2 Records on 13 March 2000 as the second single from her fifth studio album, Tropical Brainstorm. It was written by MacColl and Pete Glenister, and was produced by MacColl, Glenister and Dave Ruffy.

== Background ==
The song heavily samples "Spanish Grease", a track written by Willie Bobo and Melvin Lastie, and first recorded by Bobo in 1965. During an appearance on Later... with Jools Holland, MacColl said of the song: "It's about being a fashion victim; being a slave to fashion and crippling yourself in the process."

"In These Shoes?" reached number 81 in the UK Singles Chart in March 2000, which provided MacColl with her last entry on the chart, discounting future re-entries of her collaboration with The Pogues, "Fairytale of New York". "In These Shoes?" gained strong airplay on BBC Radio 2, but received little or no attention from other stations in the UK including Independent Local Radio. In the final week of March 2000, the song was played 15 times on Radio Two, making it the station's second most-played song that week, but it had only picked up a further 14 plays on stations monitored by Music Control UK.

The chorus is in Spanish: "No le gusta caminar, No puede montar a caballo, Cómo se puede bailar, Es un escándalo" and translates as "She doesn't like to walk, She can't ride a horse, How can she dance, It's a scandal."

== Music video ==
A music video was filmed to promote the single. It was directed by Ben Unwin and produced by Sally Collins. The comical video features several young, uncouth, working class women getting drunk in bars in various "girls night out" scenarios, including a typical "hen party", as they mime along to the lyrics of the song as if revealing their sexual misadventures to each other. MacColl herself makes a brief cameo, congratulating the bride-to-be and then dancing in a conga line in the same bar.

In the book My Kirsty – End of the Fairytale, MacColl's former manager Frank Murray recalled of the video: "We both watched it together and she thought it was so funny – she loved the fact that she barely appears in it."

== Critical reception ==
Upon its release, Paul White of The Northern Echo wrote, "It's been too long since KM has brought out a song of this quality, but it was well worth the wait. Fantastic." In a review of Tropical Brainstorm, Caroline Sullivan of The Guardian remarked, "Many women will relate to MacColl's decision to put comfort before romance on the single 'In These Shoes', where lazy percussion complements sentiments such as 'He said, 'Let's make love on a mountain top on a big hard rock'/'I said, 'In these shoes? I don't think so'." Neil Spencer of The Observer commented, "The collison between MacColl's acerbic lyricism and the sensous mundo Latino proves a winner, nowhere more so than on her current single, 'In These Shoes?', a slinky tale of hot passion and fanciful footwear destined to become a big hit."

In the US, David Bauder of the Associated Press, reviewing Tropical Brainstorm, considered "In These Shoes?" to be a "hilarious song about a woman whose obsession with fashion trumps all other interests". Landon Hall of the Associated Press considered it to be the album's "pinnacle", describing it as a "party record with a catchy Spanish chorus and sultry guitar". Andy Kellman of AllMusic felt the song was "top-shelf material". Billboard described it as "sexy" and "scandalous", and added that it was one of the tracks from Tropical Brainstorm to be among MacColl's "most vibrant work in years".

== In popular culture ==
"In These Shoes?" has been featured on various media and soundtracks, including in a TV advert for Adidas in 2000. It was used in a trailer for the British sitcom Kiss Me Kate and featured in the HBO series Sex and the City. In 2002, it was the theme to the comedy-drama series Any Time Now, and used as the theme tune of the video game This is Football 2003. In 2004, it was featured as the theme tune of the first series of The Catherine Tate Show and was also featured in the 2005 film Kinky Boots (including on its soundtrack album).

== Cover versions ==
- In 2000, American singer Bette Midler recorded her own version of the song for her album Bette. It reached No. 8 on the US Billboard Dance Music/Club Play Singles and No. 14 on the Hot Dance Music/Maxi-Singles Sales charts.
- In 2005, Irish singer Camille O'Sullivan performed the song for inclusion on her live album La Fille Du Cirque. She also performed the song on Later... with Jools Holland in 2008.

== Track listing ==
CD single (UK and Europe)

1. "In These Shoes?" – 3:40
2. "My Affair" – 3:52
3. "Good for Me" – 8:08

CD single #2 (UK and Europe)

1. "In These Shoes?" – 3:40
2. "In These Shoes?" (Le Rosbifs Mix) – 4:38
3. "In These Shoes?" (P Mix) – 4:43

CD single (Europe)

1. "In These Shoes?" – 3:40
2. "In These Shoes?" (UR Crazy Remix) – 6:04
3. "In These Shoes?" (UR Crazy Remix Edit) – 3:27
4. "In These Shoes?" (P Mix) – 4:43
5. "My Affair" (Live) – 8:17

12-inch single (Europe)

1. "In These Shoes?" (UR Crazy Remix) – 6:04
2. "In These Shoes?" (UR Crazy Remix Edit) – 3:27
3. "In These Shoes?" (Extended Moba Club) – 8:02
4. "In These Shoes?" (Moba Cut) – 4:20
5. "In These Shoes?" (Album Version) – 3:40

12-inch promotional single (UK)

1. "In These Shoes?" (Le Rosbifs Mix) – 4:38
2. "In These Shoes?" (P Mix) – 4:43

== Personnel ==
- Kirsty MacColl – vocals, autoharp
- Pete Glenister – guitar
- Ben Storey – trumpet
- Dave Ruffy – drums
- Bosco De Oliveira – percussion
- Ernesto Estruch, Felix Gonzalez, Gabriel Fonseca, Omar Puente – backing vocals

Production

- Kirsty MacColl, Pete Glenister, Dave Ruffy – producers
- Lee Groves – additional programming
- UR Production, Maurizio Pini, Max Baffa, Le Rosbifs, Steve P. – remixes

Other

- Stylorouge – design, photography

== Charts ==
=== Weekly charts ===
Chart (2000)	Peak position
Italy Airplay (Music & Media)	10
UK Singles (OCC)	81
UK Independent Singles (OCC)	17
