= When I Was Your Girl =

Single by Alison Moyet

from the album The Minutes
- Released: 1 April 2013
- Genre: Pop rock
- Length: 3:39
- Label: Cooking Vinyl
- Songwriter(s): Alison Moyet, Guy Sigsworth
- Producer(s): Guy Sigsworth

Alison Moyet singles chronology
"A Guy Like You" (2007)	"When I Was Your Girl" (2013)	"Love Reign Supreme" (2013)

Music video
- "When I Was Your Girl" on YouTube

"When I Was Your Girl" is a song by English singer-songwriter Alison Moyet, released as the first single from her eighth studio album, The Minutes (2013), which debuted at number five in the UK Albums Chart on 12 May 2013. On 5 May 2013, "When I Was Your Girl" reached number 104 in the UK Singles Chart.

"When I Was Your Girl" received its exclusive first play on Ken Bruce's BBC Radio 2 show on 19 March 2013. The music video for the single premiered the very same day via the UK web site Digital Spy. Moyet is accompanied by her real-life daughter in the video. The single's official release date was 1 April 2013.

It featured on BBC Radio 2's 'A' list and was also played regularly on other smaller radio stations including the Hull-based 106.9FM WHCR and Kingstown Radio. It was announced on 29 May 2013 that the second single taken from The Minutes would be "Love Reign Supreme".

== Music video ==
The video was filmed on England's 1.3-mile Southend Pier in March 2013. Moyet refers to it as 'a place that figured highly in my girlhood years.' The video features Moyet, and Moyet's real-life daughter, Caitlin, walking along the rain-soaked pier (as well as standing underneath it) lip-syncing to the song.

== Critical reception ==
In a review of The Minutes, AllMusic stated: ""When I Was Your Girl" doesn't stray very far from her torch song dramatics, even with its electronic palette." Digital Spy commented that the song "offers itself as a prime example of Moyet's knack for an anthemic, soft-rock serenade - provoking memories of her heyday hits." PopMatters said: "The song shows off the delight of Moyet's hard vowels to great effect, and even has a Springsteen-esque instrumental break."

musicOMH singled-out Moyet's "emotionally raw and powerful vocal". He added that the song is "ideally complemented by grand sounding strings, powerful bass and equally powerful guitar. Everything a song about a failed relationship needs, delivered with a huge wallop." Record Collector stated: "The power of her voice is a constant, though, best heard on the Abba-like theatricality of "When I Was Your Girl" and the candy-coated synth-pop of "Filigree"." The Yorkshire Times noted the song's "brooding passion", while Liverpool Sound and Vision picked the song as a "standout" from the album.

== Track listing ==
- Digital EP
1. "When I Was Your Girl" — 3:39
2. "Changeling" (Guy Sigsworth Remix) — 3:58
3. "When I Was Your Girl" (Manhattan Clique Remix) — 6:11
