= Hometime (album) =

Studio album by Alison Moyet
- Released: 19 August 2002
- Recorded: 1999–2000
- Genres: Electronica; trip hop; indie pop
- Length: 47:05
- Label: Sanctuary
- Producer: The Insects

Alison Moyet chronology
| The Essential Alison Moyet (2001) | Hometime (2002) | Voice (2004) |

Singles from Hometime
- 1. "Should I Feel That It's Over" Released: 9 September 2002; 2. "Do You Ever Wonder" Released: 11 November 2002; 3. "More" Released: 3 March 2003

Hometime is the fifth solo studio album by English singer Alison Moyet, released by Sanctuary Records on 19 August 2002 in the United Kingdom and on 10 September 2002 in the United States. It was produced by the Insects (Tim Norfolk and Bob Locke).

There is a gap of almost eight years between the release of Moyet's fourth studio album, Essex, and Hometime; owing to a legal dispute between the singer and Sony Music Entertainment UK, her former record label, who wanted her to produce what they saw as more "commercial" music. Hometime was the first album by Moyet released by her new record label, Sanctuary Records.

The album enjoyed a great deal of critical and commercial success; the album sold in excess of a quarter of a million copies in the UK within the first months of its release, Moyet became one of the top five best-selling female artists of 2002, and was nominated for a Brit Award that year.

A deluxe edition of Hometime was released by Cooking Vinyl on 2 October 2015.

== Background ==
Following the commercial success of her 1995 compilation album Singles, Moyet and Sony suffered disagreements over the singer's future artistic direction. The label expressed their wishes in having Moyet return to a commercial sound in order to replicate the success she had seen during the 1980s, however she disagreed. Although Sony commissioned the recording of a fifth studio album, Hometime, in 1999, they refused to release it once it had been completed in 2000. Eventually the label agreed to release Moyet. She told the Windy City Times in 2002: "[Sony] wanted me to follow more of a commercial line of recording than I wanted. They didn't want to release me from my contract. I think they were hoping that I'd come to my senses and that never happened."

Once released by Sony, Moyet began presenting Hometime to various independent labels. A deal was made with Sanctuary Records, then the largest independent record label in the UK, and Hometime was released in August 2002. Moyet told the Windy City Times: "I was completely blown away by the way [Sanctuary] reacted to the music. They don't have the tools that Sony has, but they completely believed in the album."

Speaking of the album to The Guardian in 2001, Moyet said: "It's an adult album but it's not mainstream. There's some blues on it, some chanson, some heavy strings. It's the best album I've ever made. A lot of people will love it but it's not Radio One." Hometime reached No. 18 in the UK. Three singles were released from the album; "Should I Feel That It's Over" (UK No. 144), "Do You Ever Wonder" (UK No. 113) and "More" (UK No. 127).

== Critical reception ==
Professional ratings
Review scores
| Source | Rating |
|---|---|
| AllMusic | 4/5 stars |
| entertainment.ie | 3/5 stars |
| Louder Than War | 8.5/10 |
| Q | 4/5 stars |
| Rolling Stone | 3/5 stars |

Upon its release, Andy Gill of The Independent commented: "It's undoubtedly her most compelling set of performances since her 1984 solo debut Alf, and may be her best album, period." David Peschek of The Guardian considered the album a "spectacular record of smouldering electronic torch songs, downbeat soul and wayward folk that is easily the best of her career." Q commented: "Eight years is a long time but this is worth the wait." Burhan Wazir of The Observer noted: "Hometime, surprisingly, is one of the most ambitious records of her career, and the strength of the songwriting rarely stumbles."

American magazine Billboard commented: "Beautifully produced by the Insects and primarily penned by the artist herself, Hometime finds Moyet tackling signature themes like love, lust and, yes, heartbreak. With Hometime, Moyet surely delivers the best album of her career." The Advocate described Hometime as a "stunning collection" combining "confessional lyrics" and "icy-cool chill-out electronic music".

The Orlando Weekly wrote: "Hometime is a soaring reminder of the potency of music itself. It's that rare album that stands above pedantic industry scrutiny, instead pulling you into a dreamlike study of the truth and beauty that reside in the difficult spaces between ourselves and others." Hal Horowitz of AllMusic noted: "Moyet's fifth album is a posh, lavish, elegant affair that shows she's lost none of her chops throughout the long layoff. Production by the Insects adds a torchy, dreamy quality to these tunes. Between the intricately crafted songs, the ornate production, and Moyet's soulful voice, this is arguably her most fully realized and cohesive work."

== Track listing ==
| No. | Title | Writer(s) | Length |
|---|---|---|---|
| 1. | "Yesterday's Flame" | Alison Moyet, Pete Glenister | 4:27 |
| 2. | "Should I Feel That It's Over" | Moyet, Glenister | 4:01 |
| 3. | "More" | Moyet, Glenister | 3:59 |
| 4. | "Hometime" | Moyet, Glenister | 3:47 |
| 5. | "Mary, Don't Keep Me Waiting" | Moyet, Glenister | 3:38 |
| 6. | "Say It" | Carlton McCarthy, Eg White | 4:00 |
| 7. | "Ski" | Moyet, B. Gray, David Ballard, Grant Clarke, John Lewis | 4:22 |
| 8. | "If You Don't Come Back to Me" | Moyet, Glenister | 4:29 |
| 9. | "Do You Ever Wonder" | McCarthy | 3:10 |
| 10. | "The Train I Ride" | Moyet, Glenister | 5:03 |
| 11. | "You Don't Have to Go" | Moyet, Glenister | 4:16 |

2015 deluxe edition (bonus disc)
| No. | Title | Writer(s) | Length |
|---|---|---|---|
| 1. | "Tongue Tied" | Moyet, Glenister | 3:14 |
| 2. | "Nobody's Darling" | Moyet, Mark Saunders | 3:38 |
| 3. | "Yesterday's Flame (Insects Remix)" | | 4:47 |
| 4. | "Bilan" | Moyet, Glenister | 4:00 |
| 5. | "If You Don't Come Back to Me (Live October 2002)" | | 4:44 |
| 6. | "Should I Feel That It's Over (Live October 2002)" | | 4:03 |
| 7. | "Si Tu Ne Me Reviens Pas" | Moyet, Glenister | 4:30 |
| 8. | "Skipping Stones (King Britts presents Sylk130)" | Moyet, King Britt | 5:27 |
| 9. | "The Train I Ride (Demo)" | | 4:03 |
| 10. | "More (Demo)" | | 3:44 |
| 11. | "Sea Child (Demo)" | Moyet, Glenister | 3:41 |
| 12. | "How Long (Demo)" | Moyet, Glenister | 4:30 |

== Personnel ==
- Alison Moyet – lead vocals, keyboards, songwriting

=== The Insects ===
- Tim Norfolk – guitar, lap steel, keyboards, percussion, drum programming (tracks: 1, 3–7, 9–11)
- Bob Locke – bass, keyboards, percussion, vibes, drum programming (tracks: 1, 4–7, 9–11), vocals (track: 10)

=== Other musicians ===
- Tammy Payne – congas (track: 1)
- David Ballard – drums, percussion (tracks: 1, 5–8, 10–11)
- Paul Sherman – bass (tracks: 2, 8)
- Roger Linley – bass (tracks: 2, 8)
- Clive Deamer – drums (track: 3)
- Corin Dingley – drums (track: 4)
- John Baggott – harpsichord (tracks: 4, 9), piano, keyboards, drum programming (tracks: 6, 7, 9, 11)
- Pete Glenister – guitar, keyboards (track: 5), songwriting
- Alex Swift – drum programming (track: 6)
- Adrian Utley – guitar (tracks: 6, 11)
- Damon Reece – percussion (tracks: 6, 7)
- Eg White – piano, drum programming (track: 6)
- Derek Green – vocals (track: 6)
- Ricci P. Washington – vocals (track: 6)
- John Lewis – guitar (track: 7)
- Simon Hale – piano (track: 9)
- Angelo Bruschini – guitar (track: 10)

=== Production ===
- The Insects – producers
- Simon Hale – string arrangement (tracks: 2, 3, 8, 9)
- Stuart Gordon – string arrangement (track: 11)

== Charts ==
Chart performance for Hometime
| Chart (2002) | Peak position |
|---|---|
| German Albums (Offizielle Top 100) | 69 |
| Scottish Albums (Official Charts) | 24 |
| UK Albums (Official Charts) | 18 |
| UK Independent Albums (Official Charts) | 3 |
