= Cry (Waterfront song) =

1988 single by Waterfront

Single by Waterfront

from the album Waterfront
- B-side: "Saved"
- Released: 1988
- Length: 3:52
- Label: Polydor
- Songwriters: Chris Duffy, Phil Cilia
- Producer: Glenn Skinner

Waterfront singles chronology
"Broken Arrow" (1988)	"Cry" (1988)	"Move On" (1989)

"Cry" is a song by British musical duo Waterfront, released as a single in 1988. The song appears on Waterfront's self-titled debut album (1989). "Cry" was a hit in both the United Kingdom and United States, entering the top 20 in the UK and the top 10 in the US.

== Charts ==
=== Weekly charts ===
Chart (1989)	Peak position
Canada Top Singles (RPM)	7
Europe (Eurochart Hot 100)	61
Italy Airplay (Music & Media)	18
New Zealand (Recorded Music NZ)	30
UK Singles (Official Charts)	17
US Billboard Hot 100	10
US Adult Contemporary (Billboard)	2

=== Year-end charts ===
Chart (1989)	Position
Canada Top Singles (RPM)	85
US Adult Contemporary (Billboard)	27
