= My Affair =

Single by Kirsty MacColl

from the album Electric Landlady
- B-side: "All the Tears That I Cried"
- Released: 29 July 1991
- Genre: Latin
- Length: 3:35 (single version); 5:23 (album version)
- Label: Virgin
- Songwriters: Kirsty MacColl; Mark E. Nevin
- Producer: Steve Lillywhite

Kirsty MacColl singles chronology
"Walking Down Madison" (1991)	"My Affair" (1991)	"All I Ever Wanted" (1991)

"My Affair" is a song by British singer and songwriter Kirsty MacColl, released by Virgin Records on 29 July 1991 as the second single from her third studio album, Electric Landlady (1991). It was written by MacColl and Mark E. Nevin, and produced by Steve Lillywhite. "My Affair" reached No. 56 in the UK and remained in the charts for two weeks. A music video was filmed to promote the single.

== Background ==
"My Affair" was one of a number of collaborations between MacColl and Nevin. Aware of her desire to produce a Latin-influenced song, Nevin presented MacColl with an instrumental demo he had. After MacColl had completed the lyrics, the pair recorded a demo version prior to the proper recording session at New York. When personal commitments prevented Nevin from traveling to the States, guitarist Pete Glenister replaced him. In a 2012 interview with The A.V. Club, Nevin recalled the phone call he had from MacColl shortly after the song had been recorded, "She was so excited, playing the whole song down the phone to me. She considered it to be the best thing she had ever done at that point."

Speaking of the song, MacColl told Melody Maker in 1991, "It's very Fifties Havana, that one. Carmen MacColl doing her damnedest. The bitch is back..." Describing the experience of recording the song, MacColl told The Desert Sun in 1991, "We recorded 'My Affair' live. We were all in the same room, looking at each other. You've got this song going and it's like, 'Wow, this is so good. I've never played like this before'. It was enormous excitement. That track I think was the most exciting, the happiest experience in my life, really."

== Critical reception ==
On its release as a single, Tom Doyle of Select wrote, "Kitschy Latin cabaret offering with a quirky lyric about parents who tell you to cut your hair and having steamy afternoon clinches. The sort of tune that's entertaining in the musical interlude of French and Saunders, but perhaps not in the Top Ten." Steve Lamacq of New Musical Express described it as "one of the swinging moments" from Electric Landlady and a track which "suggest[s] that she'[s] taken to listening to Andy Kershaw a lot". He added, "Still, not her best, and rather off-the-point, with Kirsty sounding like a cross between Sandie Shaw and Lady Penelope, while the song mingles with images of right-on restaurants and Adrian Mole." Neil Perry of Melody Maker noted MacColl's "great voice" but was critical of the song, believing her "usually delicious nonchalant delivery" to be "at odds with the [song's] swiftly annoying bouncy salsa". He added, "She's smart, is Kirsty MacColl, but perhaps sometimes too smart for her own good. Exploring is fine, but you can explore so much that you end up with nothing to call your own." Perry felt the "Irish-infused" B-side "All the Tears That I Cry" was a "much better vehicle" which "should have been the A-side".

In a review of Electric Landlady, Adam Sweeting of The Guardian wrote, "The surprise success of the bunch is 'My Affair', where an army of Hispanic musicians under the direction of Angel Hernandez go salsa-crazy behind La MacColl's cool vocals." Barbara Jaeger of The Record said of the song, "A Latin jazz feel permeates the tune, and MacColl handles the supple phrasing with elegance if not ease." Stewart Mason of AllMusic described the song as a "brilliant track" and a "sublime single", adding that it was "MacColl's first full-fledged foray into Latin music". Will Harris of The A.V. Club noted the song was "irrepressibly catchy and unabashedly flirtatious". In a retrospective overview of MacColl's career, Robin Denselow of The Guardian felt the song was "defiant and personal". Gary Graff, in his 1996 book MusicHound Rock: The Essential Album Guide, noted the song's "suave Latin arrangement".

== Track listing ==
- 7" single
1. "My Affair" - 3:35
2. "All the Tears That I Cried" - 3:31
- 12" single
1. "My Affair (Ladbroke Groove Mix)" - 6:03
2. "My Affair (Bass Sexy Mix)" - 7:02
3. "My Affair (Olive Groove Mix)" - 6:25
- Cassette single
1. "My Affair" - 3:35
2. "All the Tears That I Cried" - 3:31
- CD single
1. "My Affair" - 3:35
2. "Don't Go Near the Water" - 2:35
3. "All the Tears That I Cried" - 3:34
4. "My Affair (Olive Groove Mix)" - 6:26

== Personnel ==
- Kirsty MacColl - vocals
- Pete Glenister - guitar
- Oscar Hernández - piano
- Angel Fernandez - trumpet, string arrangement, bass arrangement
- Lepoldo Pineda, Lewis Kahn - trombone
- Joe Shepley, 'Ite' Jerez - trumpet
- Marc Quiñones - timbales
- Enrique Orengo - cello
- Felix Ferrer, Lewis Kahn, Lloyd Carter - violin
- Sal Cuevas - bass
- Robbie Ameen - drums
- José Mangual Jr. - bongos, coro
- Milton Cardona - congas

Production

- Steve Lillywhite - producer
- Alan Douglas, John Brough, Jon Fausty - engineers
- Michael White, Noel Haris, Pete Lewis - assistant engineers
- Howard Gray - remixer on "Ladbroke Groove Mix" and "Olive Groove Mix"
- Trevor Gray - additional programming and keyboards on "Ladbroke Groove Mix"
- Chad Jackson - remixer on "Bass Sexy Mix"

Other

- Bill Smith Studio, Kirsty MacColl - sleeve design
- Charles Dickins - photography
- XL Talent - management

== Charts ==
Chart (1991)	Peak position
UK Singles (OCC)	56
UK Airplay (Music Week)	25
