= Changeling (song) =

Song by Alison Moyet

Single by Alison Moyet

from the album The Minutes
- Released: 14 October 2013
- Genre: Electronic rock, electronica, dubstep
- Length: 2:57
- Label: Cooking Vinyl
- Songwriters: Alison Moyet, Guy Sigsworth
- Producer: Guy Sigsworth

Alison Moyet singles chronology
"Love Reign Supreme" (2013)	"Changeling" (2013)	"Reassuring Pinches" (2017)

Music video
- "Changeling" on YouTube

"Changeling" is a song by English pop singer-songwriter Alison Moyet, and is the third single released off her eighth studio album, The Minutes (2013).

== Background ==
Moyet offered "Changeling" as a free digital download via her web official site in February 2013 in order to give listeners a taste of what was to come from her upcoming album.

Changeling was under consideration as a possible album title. The idea was nixed once Moyet learned that singer Toyah Willcox had an album of the same name (The Changeling).

== Critical reception ==
Upon release, Contactmusic.com said: ""Changeling" finds Alison's voice on strong and seductive form, with its powerful, experimental and dramatic style indicative of the boundary-pushing album as a whole." Digital Spy noted the song indicated that Moyet's "rich vocal still lends itself remarkably well to a swirling electronic paean".

In a review of The Minutes, AllMusic noted the song's "dubstep breakdowns and drops", while Record Collector highlighted its "investigating breakbeats". The Yorkshire Times described the song as having "exciting twists". PopMatters commented of the "synth line that points as precisely as the laser moving up between James Bond's legs." musicOMH said the song "leans towards mid-to-late Madonna, with its touches of R&B and full-blown synth-pop". However, they criticised the production and backing, saying "it's extremely overproduced, with [Moyet's] vocal sounding rather robotic and contained."

== Track listing ==
1. "Changeling" — 2:57
2. "Right As Rain" (Guy Sigsworth Remix) — 3:17
3. "Right As Rain" (Terry Farley & Leo Zero Box Energy Vocal) — 7:25
4. "Right As Rain" (Terry Farley & Leo Zero Box Energy Dub) — 6:48

== Music video ==
A lyric video was released months before The Minutes was released in February 2013. A music video for the single, directed by Cat Botibol, was released on 29 September 2013.

"The video is inspired by a feeling of displacement that Alison described experiencing when she wrote the song. She found herself looking down at people from a high-up hotel window — feeling strange and like an alien, as they scurried like ants around the city streets. I flipped this on its head and shot Alison singing on her own, underneath the city in the vaults under Waterloo station. The crowds of people are represented in a projected world, casting light and shadow onto Alison. I brought the choreographer Ann Pidcock on board to work with Alison to move her body into awkward, angular shapes that took influence from the jerkiness of the track. We took some styling and lighting references from David Lynch's 'Eraserhead' to further accentuate the feeling of displacement."

— "Changeling" music video director Cat Botibol
