= The Turn (Alison Moyet album) =

Studio album by Alison Moyet
- Released: 15 October 2007
- Genres: Pop; rock
- Length: 42:46
- Labels: W14 Music; Universal Music Catalogue
- Producer: Pete Glenister

Alison Moyet chronology
Voice (2004)	The Turn (2007)	The Best of Alison Moyet (2009)

Singles from The Turn
- 1. "One More Time" Released: 8 October 2007; 2. "A Guy Like You" Released: 26 November 2007

The Turn is the seventh solo studio album by English singer Alison Moyet, released on 15 October 2007 by W14 Music and Universal Music Catalogue. The album includes the singles "One More Time" and "A Guy Like You", as well as three tracks first written and performed in 2006 for stage play Smaller, in which Moyet starred with comedian and longtime friend Dawn French. The Turn was the singer's first release on the W14 Music label and debuted at No. 21 on the UK Albums Chart on 22 October 2007, spending four weeks in the chart.

A deluxe edition of The Turn was released by Cooking Vinyl on 2 October 2015.

== Background ==
After the release and promotion of the 2004 covers album Voice, Moyet began rehearsals to play a leading role in the stage play Smaller, alongside Dawn French. The play, written by Carmel Morgan and directed by Kathy Burke, was toured across the UK for six weeks before opening at the West End's Lyric Theatre in April 2006. In addition to her role in the play, Moyet wrote three songs for the play; "World Without End", "Home" and "Smaller".

Following Smaller, Moyet began writing new material with her songwriting partner Pete Glenister before returning to the studio to record The Turn, which included the three songs penned for Smaller. The album was released in October 2007 and reached No. 21 on the UK Albums Chart. Two singles were released from the album; "One More Time" (No. 151 on the UK Singles Chart) and "A Guy Like You".

Speaking to Female First in 2007, Moyet said of the album: "The Turn is an album of crafted song. We started building it from a core of Chansons, the shapes of Roy Orbison that grow from a gentle place to an impassioned climax. It is about melody and intelligent lyrics. We let it fray outwards from there. It is in turn progressive and reflective." She told PopMatters in 2008: "One of the things I wanted to do with The Turn was write a production of songs that could be stripped down to one or two instruments if you chose to do it."

== Critical reception ==
Professional ratings
Review scores
Source	Rating
AllMusic	3.5/5 stars
BBC Music	Mixed
Billboard	Favourable
IndieLondon	3/5
Louder Than War	8.5/10
Manchester Evening News	Favourable
musicOMH	3/5 stars
PopMatters	Mixed
Record Collector	3/5 stars
The Times	3/5 stars

Upon release, Chris Long, writing for BBC Music, commented: "The Turn is no blistering return to form to sit proudly alongside the real gems of her career, but it is satisfying nonetheless, and it's a welcome reminder that Moyet still has one of the most emotive and intoxicating British voices ever." Cheryl Arrighie of 33rpm.com described the album as a "strong collection of songs" and a "marked improvement" over Voice, but was critical of the inclusion of the three songs from Smaller. She added: "You can't help feeling that it's all been done and heard before." IndieLondon felt the album was an "acquired taste", with a diversity that "creates an uneven experience". They concluded: "The Turn's most obvious asset is its voice – but given that it's the first album of new material from Moyet in five years it fails to generate the levels of excitement we'd been anticipating."

John Murphy of musicOMH felt the album "certainly delivers substance", with "several of the tracks deserv[ing] special mention". He concluded: "Quite possibly the red wine album of the year so far." Richie Unterberger of AllMusic felt the material on The Turn "mixes orchestrated pop/rock with a blue-eyed soul sensibility" and considered it "adult contemporary pop that's far above the usual standards for that genre". Chuck Taylor of Billboard wrote: "The Turn proffers all sides of the smoky, blues-soaked singer/songwriter's persona." In a review of the 2015 deluxe edition, Paul Scott-Bates of Louder Than War noted the album's "incredible depth of material" and Moyet's "superb performances".

== Track listing ==
All tracks are written by Alison Moyet and Pete Glenister.

No.	Title	Length
1.	"One More Time"	4:00
2.	"Anytime at All"	3:26
3.	"The Man in the Wings"	4:28
4.	"Can't Say It Like I Mean It"	5:40
5.	"It's Not the Thing Henry"	3:42
6.	"Fire"	3:58
7.	"The Sharpest Corner (Hollow)"	4:15
8.	"World Without End"	2:37
9.	"Home"	2:49
10.	"Smaller"	3:30
11.	"A Guy Like You"	4:19

2015 deluxe edition (disc one)
No.	Title	Writer(s)	Length
12.	"Senses"	Moyet, Glenister	3:40

2015 deluxe edition (disc two)
No.	Title	Writer(s)	Length
1.	"Fool, Reconsider Me"	Moyet, Glenister	3:22
2.	"Momma Momma"	Melanie Safka	4:47
3.	"A Guy Like You (Jeremy Wheatley Radio Edit)"		3:27
4.	"The Sharpest Corner (Hollow) (Unreleased Single Edit)"		3:34
5.	"One More Time (Live/The Turn Tour 2008)"		4:22
6.	"Wishing You Were Here (Live/The Turn Tour 2008)"	Moyet, Glenister	3:40
7.	"Dorothy (Live/The Turn Tour 2008)"	Moyet, Glenister	3:04
8.	"Can't Say It Like I Mean It (Live/The Turn Tour 2008)"		5:52
9.	"Fire (Live/The Turn Tour 2008)"		4:13
10.	"The Man in the Wings (Live/The Turn Tour 2008)"		5:08
11.	"The Sharpest Corner (Hollow) (Live/The Turn Tour 2008)"		4:26
12.	"Momma Momma (Live/The Turn Tour 2008)"		5:41
13.	"Ski (Live/The Turn Tour 2008)"	Moyet, B. Gray, David Ballard, Grant Clarke, John Lewis	4:35
14.	"You Don't Have to Go (Live/The Turn Tour 2008)"	Moyet, Glenister	5:31
15.	"Head (Live at Shepherd's Bush Empire, 2010)"	Kirsty MacColl	5:56

== Personnel ==
=== Musicians ===
- Alison Moyet – lead vocals (all tracks)
- The London Session Orchestra (LSO) – performer (tracks 1–3, 7–8)
- David Daniels – cello (LSO) (tracks 1–3, 7–8)
- Bruce White – viola (LSO) (tracks 1–3, 7–8)
- Warren Zielinski – viola (LSO) (tracks 1–2, 7), violin (tracks 3, 8)
- Boguslaw Kostecki, Patrick Kiernan – violin (LSO) (tracks 1–3, 7–8)
- Perry Montague-Mason – violin and leader (LSO) (tracks 1–3, 7–8)
- Simon Hale – conductor (LSO), arrangement and direction (tracks 1–3, 7–8)
- Pete Glenister – guitar (tracks 1–7, 9–11), keyboards (tracks 1–2, 4, 7), piano (tracks 3, 8), bass (tracks 4–5, 10), organ (track 6)
- Malcolm Moore – bass (tracks 1, 6–7)
- David Ballard – drums (track 1)
- Adam Mooney, Gabi Glenister – saxophone (track 2)
- Julian Cox – bass (tracks 2, 9)
- Bob Knight – drums (tracks 2, 4, 6, 9)
- Mary Scully – double bass (LSO) (tracks 3, 8)
- Anthony Pleeth – cello (LSO) (tracks 3, 8)
- George F. Robertson, Peter Lale – viola (LSO) (tracks 3, 8)
- Chris Tombling, Emlyn Singleton, Everton Nelson, Julian Leaper, Rita Manning, Tom Piggot-Smith – violin (LSO) (tracks 3, 8)
- Bob Andrews – Hammond organ (track 5)
- Karl Brazil – drums (tracks 5, 7)
- Jo Wilcox – oboe (track 6)
- Marcos D'Cruze – Spanish guitar (track 9)
- Marcel Azzola – accordion (track 9)
- Nick Lloyd – flugelhorn, trombone, euphonium (track 10)

=== Technical ===
- Pete Glenister – producer (all tracks), programming (tracks 1–7, 11), engineer (all tracks), mixing (tracks 1, 3, 5–8, 10–11)
- Stephen Price – strings engineer (tracks 3, 8)
- Louis Skinner – programming (track 4)
- Phil Da Costa – programming (track 5), engineer (all tracks), mixing (tracks 1, 3, 6, 8, 10–11)
- Glen Skinner – mixing (tracks 2, 4–5, 9)
- Phil Bodger – mixing (track 7)
- Dick Beetham – mastering
- John Williams – executive producer

=== Artwork ===
- Alison Cahill – sleeve design
- Sam Jones – photography

== Charts ==
Chart performance for The Turn
Chart (2007)	Peak position
Scottish Albums (Official Charts)	33
UK Albums (Official Charts)	21
