= Should I Feel That It's Over =

Single by Alison Moyet

from the album Hometime
- B-side: Tongue Tied; Nobody's Darling
- Released: 9 September 2002
- Length: 4:00
- Label: Sanctuary Records
- Songwriters: Alison Moyet, Pete Glenister
- Producer: The Insects

Alison Moyet singles chronology
"Solid Wood" (1995)	"Should I Feel That It's Over" (2002)	"Do You Ever Wonder" (2002)

"Should I Feel That It's Over" is a song by English singer Alison Moyet, which was released in 2002 as the lead single from her fifth studio album Hometime. It was also the debut single on Moyet's new label Sanctuary Records. It was written by Moyet and Pete Glenister, and produced by Tim Norfolk and Bob Locke under the name The Insects.

"Should I Feel That It's Over" was Moyet's first single release since 1995. This was caused by a dispute between Moyet and Sony Music Entertainment, her former record label, who wanted her to produce what they saw as more "commercial" music. Hometime was the first album by Moyet to be released on Sanctuary Records. Although the single failed to enter the UK Top 100, it entered the Top 200, peaking at #144.

No promotional video was filmed for the single although Moyet performed the song as part of the coverage of Glastonbury 2003. She also performed the song on the Later... with Jools Holland show along with the follow-up single "Do You Ever Wonder".

The single's two B-Sides, "Tongue Tied" and "Nobody's Darling", were exclusive to the single.

== Critical reception ==
In a review of Hometime, Andy Gill of The Independent felt the song "sounds uncannily like a Coldplay out-take, with Moyet's vocal elision lent grandeur by a dramatic string arrangement". Billboard said the song "is, simply put, today's Moyet giving us classic Moyet". The Orlando Weekly commented on the song's "disaffected lament" and "Spector-esque embellishments [that] knock the chorus into the stratosphere".

Ken Foster of Salon commented: "On "Should I Feel That It's Over," she chastises an emotionally distant partner to a gloriously upbeat melody." Reviewing the 2016 deluxe edition of the album, Paul Scott-Bates of Louder Than War said the song is a "medium paced effort again proudly displaying the voice that we had slowly expected to be incredible and were subsequently never disappointed by." In a 2015 retrospective on Moyet's career, Classic Pop included the song as one of twenty favourites as chosen by the magazine. They described it as a "majestic guitar-based song".

== Formats ==
CD Single (UK release)

1. "Should I Feel That It's Over" - 4:00
2. "Tongue Tied" - 3:15
3. "Nobody's Darling" - 3:39

== Chart performance ==
Chart (2002)	Peak position
UK Singles Chart	144

== Personnel ==
- Producer - Tim Norfolk, Bob Locke (The Insects)
- Photography – Paul Cox
- Art Direction – Bill Smith
- Design – Ian Ross for BSS
