= All I Ever Wanted (Kirsty MacColl song) =

Single by Kirsty MacColl

from the album Electric Landlady
- B-side: "There's a Guy Works Down the Chip Shop Swears He's Elvis (Live)"
- Released: October 1991
- Length: 3:30
- Label: Virgin
- Songwriter(s): Kirsty MacColl; Marshall Crenshaw
- Producer(s): Steve Lillywhite

Kirsty MacColl singles chronology
"My Affair" (1991)	"All I Ever Wanted" (1991)	"Angel" (1993)

"All I Ever Wanted" is a song by English singer-songwriter Kirsty MacColl, released in 1991 as the third and final single from her third studio album, Electric Landlady. The song was written by MacColl and Marshall Crenshaw, and was produced by Steve Lillywhite. It peaked at number 91 in the UK Singles Chart.

== Background ==
In a promotional video on the making of Electric Landlady, MacColl commented, "'All I Ever Wanted' is a song I wrote with Marshall Crenshaw some time ago. We actually wrote it by post. He sent me a cassette from New York of some chord patterns that he'd put down. Then I put down some vocals and got the lyrics together, and sent it back to him. And he was like 'Well I can't sing this, this is a girl's song', so we put it on hold and now I've finally done it. I recorded it in New York with the Latin band. It sounds great, it sounds like Buddy Holly and Acapulco."

Crenshaw later submitted the song when asked to provide a song for the film That Thing You Do! but it was not selected.

== Release ==
The song was remixed for its release as a single. Three live tracks were included across the single's different formats: "There's a Guy Works Down the Chip Shop Swears He's Elvis", "Walk Right Back" and "A New England". The tracks were recorded live for BBC Radio 1's Into the Night on 26 June 1991.

The song failed to enter the top 75 of the UK Singles Chart and reached its peak at number 91 on 19 October 1991. It also reached number 35 in the Music Week Playlist Chart on 19 October 1991.

== Music video ==
A music video was filmed to promote the single. It was directed by Jeff Baynes, produced by Michael Brown and features Rowland Rivron.

== Critical reception ==
Upon its release as a single, Andrew Hirst of the Huddersfield Daily Examiner described "All I Ever Wanted" as a "flighty folk number", but added that it was a "strange single choice when far better tunes lay dormant on her excellent Electric Landlady album". Andrew Collins of NME felt it "sounds like an album track" as well as "a kid's TV theme made out of 'American Pie'". He added, "However, I hope it goes to number one for 14 weeks so that Virgin feel shit about refusing to fund Kirsty's first tour. How much did the Paris Angels' limo cost?" John Greenwood of the Halifax Evening Courier called it a "wistful slice of pop and added that "as usual, it has a touch of class".

In a review of Electric Landlady, Steve Pick of the St. Louis Post-Dispatch commented how "All I Ever Wanted" "implicitly connects the early Beatles with the bossa nova that had to influence them". Mike Curtin of The Post-Star described it as "the best 10,000 Maniacs song that the Jamestown, N.Y., folk-rock band never wrote". John Kovalic of the Wisconsin State Journal wrote, "The solid, catchy pop of 'All I Ever Wanted' may be the [album]'s strongest selling point". Barbara Jaeger of The Record noted, "The collection has its share of folk-rock tunes, the catchiest of which are 'All I Ever Wanted' and 'He Never Mentioned Love'. The delightful melodies of both are the springboards from which MacColl's voice soars." In The Trouser Press Guide to '90s Rock, Ira A. Robbins said of MacColl's 1995 compilation Galore, "Galore gives Electric Landlady short shrift by omitting the pure pop delight of 'All I Ever Wanted'."

== Track listing ==
7" and cassette single

1. "All I Ever Wanted" - 3:30
2. "There's a Guy Works Down the Chip Shop Swears He's Elvis" (Live) - 3:49

CD single (UK #1)

1. "All I Ever Wanted" - 3:30
2. "There's a Guy Works Down the Chip Shop Swears He's Elvis" (Live) - 3:49
3. "Walk Right Back" (Live) - 3:38
4. "A New England" (Live Acoustic Duet with Billy Bragg) - 3:27

CD single (UK #2)

1. "All I Ever Wanted" - 3:30
2. "What Do Pretty Girls Do?" - 2:38
3. "Walk Right Back" (Live) - 3:38
4. "There's a Guy Works Down the Chip Shop Swears He's Elvis" (Live) - 3:49

CD single (US promo)

1. "All I Ever Wanted" - 3:30
2. "All the Tears That I Cried" - 3:31

== Personnel ==
All I Ever Wanted

- Kirsty MacColl – vocals
- Pete Glenister – guitar
- Elliott Randall – guitar
- Ian Aitken – acoustic guitar
- Oscar Hernández – piano
- Judd Lander – harmonica
- Sal Cuevas – bass
- Robbie Ameen – drums
- Milton Cardona – conga
- José Mangual Jr. – bongo guiro
- Marc Quiñones – timbal

Production

- Steve Lillywhite – producer ("All I Ever Wanted", "What Do Pretty Girls Do?"), mixing on single version of "All I Ever Wanted"
- Jon Fausty – engineer and mixing on album version of "All I Ever Wanted"
- John Brough – engineer on album version of "All I Ever Wanted"
- Alan Douglas – engineer on album version of "All I Ever Wanted"
- Pete Lewis – mixing on album version of "All I Ever Wanted"
- Howard Gray – mixing on single version of "All I Ever Wanted"
- Trevor Gray – mixing on single version of "All I Ever Wanted"
- Paul Williams – producer (BBC live tracks)
- Paul Roberts – engineer (BBC live tracks)

Other

- Kirsty MacColl – sleeve design
- Bill Smith Studio – sleeve design
- Charles Dickins – photography

== Charts ==
Chart (1991–92)	Peak position
Australia (ARIA)	154
UK Singles Chart (OCC)	91
UK Music Week Playlist Chart	35
