= Love Reign Supreme =

Single by Alison Moyet

from the album The Minutes
- Released: 1 June 2013
- Genre: Synthpop
- Length: 3:45
- Label: Cooking Vinyl
- Songwriters: Alison Moyet, Guy Sigsworth, Cass Lowe
- Producer: Guy Sigsworth

Alison Moyet singles chronology
"When I Was Your Girl" (2013)	"Love Reign Supreme" (2013)	"Changeling" (2013)

"Love Reign Supreme" is a song by English Pop singer-songwriter Alison Moyet, and is the second single released off her eighth studio album, The Minutes (2013).

In her native United Kingdom, during June 2013 it received a decent amount of airplay joining BBC Radio 2 'A' List on also been played on regional BBC stations like BBC Radio Humberside and smaller stations like 106.9FM WHCR.

== Music video ==
A music video for the single was shot on 18 April 2013 at Moyet's London's Bush Hall gig.

== Critical reception ==
In a review of The Minutes, AllMusic picked the song as one of two tracks that "remotely suggest Yaz". They described the song as "jaunty" and "pulsing", and "about resilience in the most difficult of times". Digital Spy described the song as a "light and fun Yazoo-flecked number that showcases the pop talents of producer Guy Sigsworth", while musicOMH felt the song "acts as the ultimate crossover between Yazoo-era and current Moyet". They noted the "fantastic sounding '80s-style high-tempo loops" and Moyet's "mature sounding vocal".

Liverpool Sound and Vision picked the song as a "standout" from the album. PopMatters commented the song "sounds like Daft Punk on holiday in Essex", while Record Collector described the song as "bass-driven dance minimalism".

== Track listing ==
1. "Love Reign Supreme" (Radio Edit) – 3:41
