= Hoodoo (Alison Moyet album) =

Studio album by Alison Moyet
- Released: 22 April 1991
- Genre: Alternative pop
- Length: 47:32
- Label: Columbia
- Producer: Andy Cox; Dave Dix; Pete Glenister; David Steele

Alison Moyet chronology
| Raindancing (1987) | Hoodoo (1991) | Essex (1994) |

Singles from Hoodoo
- 1. "It Won't Be Long" Released: 25 March 1991; 2. "Wishing You Were Here" Released: 20 May 1991; 3. "Hoodoo" Released: August 1991; 4. "This House" Released: 30 September 1991

Hoodoo is the third solo studio album by English singer Alison Moyet, released by Columbia Records on 22 April 1991 in the United Kingdom and on 27 August 1991 in the United States. It reached No. 11 on the UK Albums Chart and features the singles "It Won't Be Long", "Wishing You Were Here", "Hoodoo" and "This House".

Largely produced by Pete Glenister, the album includes contributions from Kirsty MacColl, Steve Lillywhite, Marius De Vries, and ex-Fine Young Cannibals Andy Cox and David Steele.

A deluxe edition of Hoodoo was released by BMG on 25 November 2016.

== Background ==
"It's an anger album. There is energy and aggression to the songs. I'd had some shitty break-ups and was in that dark place where you go when you've been embattled. With Hoodoo I was ready to voice it unequivocally."

— Alison Moyet discussing the album's theme.

Having recording her second studio album Raindancing while living in Los Angeles, Moyet returned to live in England after completing a world tour. Moyet's record company, CBS, wanted her to continue producing pop hits, but this left the singer feeling artistically compromised and under pressure to deliver. During the period after returning to England, Moyet began a songwriting partnership with Pete Glenister, who had been Moyet's guitarist for part of the Raindancing tour. Keen to have more artistic freedom, she suggested to CBS that Glenister should produce her. Muff Winwood of the label's A&R division granted Moyet permission to record the album she wanted to. Moyet later recalled in 2007: "In making Hoodoo, we were left to our own devices and found some passion and aggression again. It is not a flawless record... but it became a road that led to my understanding myself much better. It has some songs on it that I am very proud of and favourites, 'It Won't Be Long', 'This House', 'Hoodoo' and chunks of 'Footsteps'."

Hoodoo was released in the UK in April 1991 and in America in August that year. Although the album was not as commercially successful as previous efforts, Hoodoo reached No. 11 in the UK and saw moderate chart action in various European countries too. The album's lead single was "It Won't Be Long", which was released in March 1991. Despite gaining extensive airplay, the song peaked at No. 50 in the UK. The second single "Wishing You Were Here" was released in May, reaching No. 72 in the UK. In August, the title track "Hoodoo" was issued as a promotional single solely in the United States. "This House", the album's fourth and final single, was released in September and reached No. 40 in the UK.

Following the album's mixed reception and disappointing sales, Moyet's relationship with CBS became further strained as the label began to lose interest in Moyet. Despite the decline in sales, "It Won't Be Long" received a Grammy nomination for Best Rock Vocal performance at the 35th Grammy Awards. Although the album failed to chart in the United States, Billboard magazine reported in February 1994 that Hoodoo had sold 85,000 copies.

== Critical reception ==
Professional ratings
Review scores
| Source | Rating |
|---|---|
| AllMusic | 4/5 stars |
| Calgary Herald | C |
| Louder Than War | 8/10 |
| NME | 5/10 |
| Reflections of Darkness | 7.5/10 stars |
| Rolling Stone | 3.5/5 stars |

Upon its release, Jim Arundel of Melody Maker gave a mixed review. He felt that much of the material on Hoodoo failed to live up to the single "It Won't Be Long", which he considered to be "a bit of a masterpiece". He noted, "The voice is as pleasingly raw and exposed as it has ever been and Glenister has kept the edges in the sound, but, unfortunately, the songs are most undistinguished." Stuart Maconie of NME also had a mixed reaction, describing it as "pretty good in parts", including the "very groovy and modern" "It Won't Be Long" and the "splendid" title track, but ultimately "only firing on half its cylinders". He noted that Moyet and her "formidable team" have "fashioned a sound that takes on board a whole cargo of '90s reference points but stays true to Alison's soulful leanings", but felt the album "carr[ies] a lot of ballast; material that, frankly, isn't up to it".

In the US, People felt the album "for the most part charms". They praised Moyet's "amazing voice" and felt it was presented best on the material with "minimal acoustic backing" such as "This House" and "Wishing You Were Here". Musician commented, "Moyet certainly understands style – her gospel shout would be the envy of any Pentecostal choir, while her ballad voice is as naked and soulful as a Nina Simone lament. She also understands that style is meaningless without emotional content. From the anger of 'Rise' to the anguish in 'This House,' that's what keeps this collection from turning into just another singer's showcase."

In a retrospective review of the album, Tom Demalon of AllMusic described it as "possibly her most soulful collection yet" and "another strong offering from the distinctive Moyet". He commented, "She hasn't lost her knack for breezy, adult pop, evident on the lilting, melodic 'Wishing You Were Here' and 'It Won't Be Long,' but tracks like the horn-driven 'Footsteps' and high-energy title song form the core of Hoodoo. With the lyrics squarely focused on relationships, Moyet is often brassy and assertive as on 'Back Where I Belong.' She's still more than capable of expressing heart-aching vulnerability, though, especially on the gorgeous 'This House'."

In a 2016 review of the deluxe edition of Hoodoo, Helena Adams of the music website Reflections of Darkness noted that Hoodoo seemed to be "a cohesive and maybe more authentic album than [Moyet's] previous ventures". Attitude writer Josh Lee described it as "great" and noted the "rawer, more aggressive sound" in comparison to Moyet's previous albums. He likened the change to Kylie Minogue's "switch from pop princess to IndieKylie" but added that Moyet presented "more anger and a brassier soul sound". Gay Times writer Darren Howard described Hoodoo as an album that's "now seen as a modern classic that slightly under-performed". He added, "It's as dark and as angry as Marc Almond at his best but still keeps a pop edge. This is the sound of someone's heart being torn apart and poured out, it has intricate melodies and poetic, dense lyrics that are a million miles away from 'Invisible'."

== Track listing ==
| No. | Title | Writer(s) | Length |
|---|---|---|---|
| 1. | "Footsteps" | Alison Moyet, Pete Glenister | 4:58 |
| 2. | "It Won't Be Long" | Moyet, Glenister | 4:14 |
| 3. | "This House" | Moyet | 3:55 |
| 4. | "Rise" | Alison Moyet, Matt Irving, Mark Pinder | 3:46 |
| 5. | "Wishing You Were Here" | Moyet, Glenister | 3:57 |
| 6. | "Hoodoo" | Moyet, Glenister | 4:42 |
| 7. | "(Meeting with My) Main Man" | Moyet, Glenister | 4:39 |
| 8. | "Back Where I Belong" | Moyet, Glenister | 3:51 |
| 9. | "My Right A.R.M." | Moyet, Glenister | 4:46 |
| 10. | "Never Too Late" | Moyet, Warren Kennedy, Dean Kennedy | 3:28 |
| 11. | "Find Me" | Moyet, Gerry Colvin | 5:25 |

2016 remastered deluxe edition (bonus disc)
| No. | Title | Writer(s) | Length |
|---|---|---|---|
| 1. | "Take of Me" | Moyet, Glenister | 4:02 |
| 2. | "Back Where I Belong" (Polite Mix) | | 5:27 |
| 3. | "Back Where I Belong" (Soft Mix) | | 5:32 |
| 4. | "Come Back Home" | Moyet, Dave Dix | 3:21 |
| 5. | "Hoodoo" (extended version) | | 7:43 |
| 6. | "Hoodoo" (Starlight Dub) | | 6:13 |
| 7. | "Hoodoo" (single version) | | 4:06 |
| 8. | "Hoodoo" (instrumental) | | 7:18 |
| 9. | "It Won't Be Long" (live at the Town & Country Club, 1991) | | 4:30 |
| 10. | "Wishing You Were Here" (live at the Town & Country Club, 1991) | | 4:08 |
| 11. | "Never Too Late" (live at the Town & Country Club, 1991) | | 4:47 |
| 12. | "Find Me" (live at the Town & Country Club, 1991) | | 5:43 |
| 13. | "(Meeting with My) Main Man" (live at the Town & Country Club, 1991) | | 4:52 |
| 14. | "Dig a Hole" (demo) | Moyet | 2:44 |

== Personnel ==
- Alison Moyet – vocals, backing vocals (tracks: 1 to 10), programming (tracks: 3, 5, 9, 10), harmonica "Rise", vocals end chorus "Find Me"
- Pete Glenister – guitar, programming (tracks: 1, 3 to 7, 9, 10), backing vocals "(Meeting With My) Main Man", – vocals (end chorus) "Find Me"
- Bob Andrews – keyboards (tracks: 1, 2, 4 to 7, 9 to 11), Hammond Organ "Never Too Late", programming "Wishing You Were Here"
- Phil Legg – programming (tracks: 1, 7, 9, 10)
- Dyan Birch – backing vocals "Footsteps"
- Frank Collins – backing vocals "Footsteps"
- Paddie McHugh – backing vocals "Footsteps"
- Kick Horns – horns "Footsteps", "Find Me"
- Jeff Scantlebury – percussion "Footsteps", "Find Me"
- Ben Watkins – programming "Footsteps", "Rise", effects (noises) "Wishing You Were Here", effects (Ergasmatron) "(Meeting With My) Main Man", backing vocals "Never Too Late"
- Mike Gaffey – programming "Footsteps"
- Simon Fowler – backing vocals "It Won't Be Long"
- Steve Cradock – backing vocals "It Won't Be Long"
- John McKenzie – bass "It Won't Be Long" and "Find Me"
- Blair Cunningham – drums "It Won't Be Long" & "Find Me"
- Hugh Burns – guitar "This House"
- Dave Dix – keyboards, piano (Zing) "This House"
- Graham Henderson – piano "This House"
- The Mint Juleps – backing vocals "Rise"
- Rob Rawlinson – bass "Rise"
- Danny Thompson – double bass
- Neil Conti – drums "Wishing You Were Here"
- Kirsty MacColl – vocals (Elysian Chorus) "Wishing You Were Here"
- Steve Sidelnik – percussion "Hoodoo"
- Marius de Vries – programming "Hoodoo"
- Neil Brockbank – programming "Hoodoo"
- Deborah Lewis – backing vocals "Back Where I Belong"
- Michelle Cross – backing vocals "Back Where I Belong"
- David Steele – bass, programming "Back Where I Belong"
- Andy Cox – guitar, programming "Back Where I Belong"
- The Reggae Philharmonic Orchestra – strings "Back Where I Belong"
- George Chandler – backing vocals "Find Me"
- Jimmy Chambers – backing vocals "Find Me"
- Jimmy Helms – backing vocals "Find Me"
- Eugene Ellis – vocals (end chorus) "Find Me"
- Joanne Wakeling – vocals (end chorus) "Find Me"
- Ron "Baby Bio" Aslan – vocals (end chorus) "Find Me"

Production

- Pete Glenister – producer
- Dave Dix, producer, arranger, sound mixing "This House"
- Andy Cox – producer, sound mixing "Back Where I Belong"
- David Steele – producer, sound mixing "Back Where I Belong"
- Alison Moyet – arranger backing vocals, arranger "This House"
- Dave Dix – arranger "This House"
- Fiachra Trench – arranger strings "Find Me"
- Martin Rex – sound engineer (tracks: 1, 4, 5, 11)
- Neil Brockbank – sound engineer (tracks: 1 to 7, 9 to 11)
- Phil Legg – sound engineer (tracks: 7, 9, 10), sound mixing "My Right A.R.M."
- Barry Hammond – sound engineer "This House"
- Chris Dickey – sound engineer "This House"
- John Fryer – sound engineer "This House"
- Dave Anderson – sound engineer "Back Where I Belong"
- Tom Lord Alge – sound mixing (tracks: 1, 4, 7, 10, 11)
- Chris Dickey – sound mixing "This House"
- Neil Brockbank – sound mixing "This House", "Hoodoo"
- Pete Glenister – sound mixing "This House", "Hoodoo"
- Steve Lillywhite – sound mixing "Wishing You Were Here"

== Charts ==
Chart performance for Hoodoo
| Chart (1991) | Peak position |
|---|---|
| Australian Albums (ARIA Charts) | 120 |
| Dutch Albums (Album Top 100) | 55 |
| European Albums (Music & Media) | 27 |
| German Albums (Offizielle Top 100) | 36 |
| Irish Albums (IFPI) | 10 |
| New Zealand Albums (RMNZ) | 47 |
| Swedish Albums (Sverigetopplistan) | 42 |
| Swiss Albums (Schweizer Hitparade) | 22 |
| UK Albums (OCC) | 11 |
