= Waterfront (album) =

Studio album by Waterfront
- Released: 1989
- Recorded: 1988–1989
- Studios: Chipping Norton Recording Studios, Genetic Studios, Angel Studios, RAK Studios, Swanyard Studios, Britannia Row Studios, The Music Factory (Cardiff)
- Genre: Sophisti-pop
- Length: 45:28
- Label: Polydor
- Producers: Glenn Skinner (tracks 1–10), Waterfront (track 11)

Waterfront chronology
Waterfront (1989)	Ghosts of the Good (2011)

Singles from Waterfront
- 1. "Cry" Released: March 1989

Professional ratings
Review scores
Source	Rating
AllMusic	2.5/5 stars
Smash Hits	7.5/10

Waterfront is the debut studio album by British sophistipop duo Waterfront. Released in both the UK and the US in 1989, it featured the hit single "Cry", which reached number 10 in the U.S. in 1989.

== Reception ==
Juke said, "Waterfront are this years Climie Fisher and the latest in a line of embarrassingly bland midday radio fodder. Imagine a mix of ABC with early Wham! without the flair, the songs, or the originality." AllMusic said, "The duo's only album Waterfront has a few pleasant moments but most of the album is vapid adult contemporary filler, lushly produced but utterly forgettable."

== Track listing ==
- All songs written and arranged by Waterfront (SBK Music Ltd.)
1. "Tightrope" - 3:34
2. "Cry" - 3:54
3. "Platinum Halo" - 3:40
4. "Nature of Love" - 4:54
5. "Move On" - 4:25
6. "Dancing with Strangers" - 4:28
7. "Set You Free" - 3:37
8. "Broken Arrow" - 4:31
9. "Soul Survivor" - 3:48
10. "Waterfront" - 5:17
11. "Saved" - 3:20

== Personnel ==
=== Waterfront ===
- Chris Duffy - vocals
- Phil Cilia - guitar

=== Additional personnel ===
- Martin Shellard - guitar solos on tracks 1, 3 and 9; additional guitars on tracks 2, 4–8 and 10
- Pete Glenister - additional guitars on tracks 3, 9 and 10
- Richard Dunn, Peter Marshall - keyboards
- Chris Senior - additional keyboards
- John Newman - additional keyboard programming
- Chris Childs - bass
- Greg Haver - drums, drum programming
- Jeff Scantlebury - percussion
- Molly Duncan, Gary Barnacle - saxophone
- Neil Sidwell - trombone
- Dee and Shirley Lewis - backing vocals
- Anne Dudley - strings arrangements, conductor

=== Production ===
- Arranged by Waterfront
- Produced by Glenn Skinner; track 11 produced by Waterfront
- Recording and mix engineers: David Shell and Neil Brockbank
- Assistant Engineers: Alistair Johnson, Eugene Ellis, Ian Clarke, Phil Thornalley, Spencer Henderson

== Charts ==
Chart (1989)	Peak position
UK Albums (Official Charts)	45
US Billboard 200	103
