= Electric Landlady =

Studio album by Kirsty MacColl
- Released: 24 June 1991
- Recorded: 1991
- Studio: Electric Lady Studios (New York); Ealing Studios; Moody Studios; Metropolis Studios; The Town House (London)
- Genre: Alternative rock; pop rock; folk rock; country rock; blues rock; world
- Length: 51:49
- Label: Virgin
- Producer: Steve Lillywhite

Kirsty MacColl chronology
Kite (1989)	Electric Landlady (1991)	The Essential Collection (1993)

Singles from Electric Landlady
- 1. "Walking Down Madison" Released: 7 May 1991; 2. "My Affair" Released: 29 July 1991; 3. "All I Ever Wanted" Released: October 1991

Electric Landlady is Kirsty MacColl's third studio album. Released in 1991, it was her second Virgin Records release and second collaboration with producer/husband Steve Lillywhite. The title is a pun on Jimi Hendrix's album Electric Ladyland.

Electric Landlady was MacColl's most successful U.S. release, owing to the lead track "Walking Down Madison", which peaked at No. 4 on the Billboard Modern Rock Tracks chart. The longest song of the album, it features guest vocals by rapper Aniff Cousins, and was originally written for Alison Moyet.

== Background ==
In a 1991 interview with Melody Maker, MacColl spoke of her intention for the album's direction in comparison to her 1989 album Kite, "I was listening to Kite for the first time in a while and I thought, 'Well that's really good, but I could make the next album even more enjoyable for myself if I could actually dance to it without being paralytic! But I didn't want to make an album with computers. A lot of people think that dance means you have to have the beats per minute on the sleeve, but, to me, a waltz is a dance." Speaking of the larger number of co-writes on Electric Landlady, she added, "With Kite, I felt I had to prove that I wasn't this bimbo girl-next-door I'd been portrayed as. I wanted to make the point that, yes, I can write a song, pal! I didn't feel that I had to prove myself this time."

== Critical reception ==
Professional ratings
Review scores
Source	Rating
AllMusic	3.5/5 stars
Entertainment Weekly	B−
NME	6/10
Select	4/5 stars

Upon its release, Andrew Mueller of Melody Maker considered the album to be disappointing in comparison to the "frequently brilliant" Kite. He felt that melodically there "aren't any tunes to speak of" and noted the lack of MacColl's "customary razor wit" in the lyrics. He summarised, "Kite was such a great album because it was happy to be an album of great pop songs. Electric Landlady is such a resounding duffer because it's so pointlessly eclectic that you can't get a grip on it anywhere. It's like Kirsty's decided that she wants to impersonate every band she's ever lent that gorgeous voice to at least once." Steve Lamacq of NME considered it "an adult but very confused record". He believed MacColl was "probably writing as well as ever", but felt the album featured too many guest musicians and producers who "all know too much about recording", resulting in "too much [of an] emphasis on arrangements and production, which detracts from the actual mainspring, Kirsty's voice/lyrics/simplicity". He concluded, "Electric Landlady, as a whole, has a lot of things you like - outspokenness and invention - but buries them under the weight of professionalism."

== Track listing ==
No.	Title	Writer(s)	Length
1.	"Walking Down Madison"	Kirsty MacColl, Johnny Marr	6:35
2.	"All I Ever Wanted"	MacColl, Marshall Crenshaw	3:51
3.	"Children of the Revolution"	MacColl, Marr	4:00
4.	"Halloween"	MacColl, Mark E. Nevin	3:38
5.	"My Affair"	MacColl, Nevin	5:25
6.	"Lying Down"	MacColl, Pete Glenister	4:51
7.	"He Never Mentioned Love"	MacColl, Jem Finer	3:53
8.	"We'll Never Pass This Way Again"	MacColl, Nevin	4:33
9.	"The Hardest Word"	MacColl, Hamish MacColl	4:36
10.	"Maybe It's Imaginary"	MacColl, Nevin	2:13
11.	"My Way Home"	MacColl, Glenister	4:27
12.	"The One and Only"	MacColl, Nevin	3:42
Total length:			51:49

2005 reissue bonus tracks
No.	Title	Writer(s)	Origin	Length
13.	"Don't Go Near the Water"	Mike Love, Alan Jardine	B-side to "My Affair"	2:34
14.	"One Good Thing"	MacColl, Glenister	B-side to "Walking Down Madison"	3:37
15.	"Darling, Let's Have Another Baby" (feat. Billy Bragg)	Fred Berk	B-side to "Walking Down Madison"	3:26
16.	"My Affair" (Bass Sexy mix)	MacColl, Nevin	B-side to "My Affair" 12"	7:04
17.	"Walking Down Madison" (6am Ambient mix)	MacColl, Marr	B-side to "Walking Down Madison" 12"	4:58
Total length:				74:03

=== 2012 deluxe edition bonus CD ===
The first disc contains the twelve tracks from the original album.

CD 2
No.	Title	Writer(s)	Origin	Length
1.	"One Good Thing"	MacColl, Glenister	B-side to "Walking Down Madison"	3:37
2.	"The Hardest Word" (Alt. Take 3)	MacColl, MacColl	Previously unreleased; outtake from the Electric Landlady sessions	5:02
3.	"Walking Down Madison" (6am Ambient Mix)	MacColl, Marr	B-side to "Walking Down Madison" 12"	5:46
4.	"Walking Down Madison" (Extended Urban Mix)	MacColl, Marr	B-side to "Walking Down Madison" US CD single	6:36
5.	"Walking Down Madison" (LP Extended Mix)	MacColl, Marr	B-side to "Walking Down Madison" UK CD single	6:36
6.	"Darling, Let's Have Another Baby" (feat. Billy Bragg)	Berk	B-side to "Walking Down Madison" CD single	3:26
7.	"All the Tears That I Cried" (with the Pogues)	MacColl, Nevin	B-side to "My Affair"	3:31
8.	"My Affair" (Ladbroke Groove Mix)	MacColl, Nevin	B-side to "My Affair" 12"	6:05
9.	"My Affair" (Bass Sexy Mix)	MacColl, Nevin	B-side to "My Affair" 12"	7:03
10.	"My Affair" (Olive Groove Mix)	MacColl, Nevin	B-side to "My Affair" 12" and CD single	6:26
11.	"Don't Go Near the Water"	Love, Jardine	B-side to "My Affair" CD single	2:34
12.	"All I Ever Wanted" (Re-recorded single version)	MacColl, Crenshaw	Single, 1991	3:30
13.	"There's a Guy Works Down the Chip Shop Swears He's Elvis" (BBC Session)	MacColl, Philip Rambow	B-side to "All I Ever Wanted" CD single; The Nicky Campbell Show, broadcast 26 June 1991	3:49
14.	"Walk Right Back" (BBC Session)	Sonny Curtis	B-side to "All I Ever Wanted" CD single; The Nicky Campbell Show, broadcast 26 June 1991	3:48
15.	"Darling, Let's Have Another Baby" (BBC Session; feat. Billy Bragg)	Berk	What Do Pretty Girls Do?, 1998; The Nicky Campbell Show, broadcast 26 June 1991	2:38
16.	"A New England" (BBC Session; feat. Billy Bragg)	Bragg	B-side to "All I Ever Wanted" CD single; The Nicky Campbell Show, broadcast 26 June 1991	3:27

== Personnel ==
Credits adapted from the album's liner notes.

Musicians

- Kirsty MacColl – vocals, keyboards (3), guitar (8), autoharp (10)
- Elliot Randall – guitar (1, 2, 6–8, 11)
- Pete Glenister – guitar (2, 5–8), acoustic guitar (4, 9–11)
- Mark E. Nevin – guitar (4, 6), acoustic guitar (4, 9–12)
- Ian Aitken – acoustic guitar (2, 7, 11)
- Johnny Marr – guitar (1, 3), keyboards (1, 3)
- Colin Stuart – mandolin (9), acoustic guitar (10, 11)
- Philip Chevron – guitar (12)
- Jem Finer – banjo (12)
- Terry Woods – cittern (12)
- Sal Cuevas – bass (2, 3, 5, 7, 8)
- Pino Palladino – bass (4, 6, 9–11)
- Guy Pratt – bass (1)
- Darryl Hunt – bass (12)
- Oscar Hernández – piano (2, 5, 7, 8)
- Hamish MacColl – keyboards (9)
- Ed Shearmur – piano (6), clavinet (6)
- Trevor Gray – bass synthesizer (1), organ (1), programming (1)
- James Fearnley – accordion (12)
- Robby Ameen – drums (2, 3, 5, 7, 8)
- Mel Gaynor – drums (4, 6, 9–11)
- David Palmer – drums (1, 3)
- Andrew Ranken – drums (12)
- Dave Valentin – ocarina (9), flutes (9), pan pipe (9)
- Judd Lander – harmonica (2)
- Spider Stacy – whistle (12)
- Jody Linscott – percussion (1)
- Milton Cardona – percussion (2–5, 7–9, 11)
- José Mangual Jr. – percussion (2–5, 7–9, 11)
- Marc Quiñones – percussion (2, 3, 5, 7–9, 11)
- Adrian Lillywhite – percussion (6, 7, 12)
- Angel Fernandez – trumpet (5), brass arrangement (4, 5, 11), string arrangements (5)
- Leopoldo Pineda – trombone (5)
- Lewis Kahn – trombone (4, 5, 11), violin (4, 5)
- Ité Jerez – trumpet (4, 5, 11)
- Steve Sacks – alto saxophone (4, 11), soprano saxophone (11)
- Joseph J. Shepley – trumpet (5)
- Felix Farrar – violin (5)
- Lloyd Carter – violin (5)
- Bob Loveday – violin (7, 10)
- Enrique Orengo – cello (5)
- Aniff Cousins – rap (1)
- Jimmy Chambers – background vocals (1)
- George Chandler – background vocals (1)

Technical

- Steve Lillywhite – production, additional mix (1)
- John Brough – engineer (Ealing, Moody, Metropolis and Townhouse Studios), mixing (1)
- Alan Douglas – engineer (Townhouse Studios)
- Jon Fausty – engineer (Electric Lady Studios), mixing
- Pete Lewis – assistant engineer (Townhouse Studios), mixing
- Noel Haris – assistant engineer (Ealing, Moody and Metropolis Studios)
- Michael White – assistant engineer (Electric Lady Studios)
- Howard Gray – additional production (1), additional mix (1)
- Chris Bandy – assistant engineer and mixing (1)
- Bill Smith Studio – design
- Kirsty MacColl – design, illustration
- Charles Dickins – photography
- Sarah Tuft – photography
- Paul Williams – production (BBC Sessions)

== Charts ==
Chart performance for Electric Landlady
Chart (1991)	Peak position
Australian Albums (ARIA)	86
UK Albums (OCC)	17
