= Mambo de la Luna =

Single by Kirsty MacColl

from the album Tropical Brainstorm
- Released: November 1999
- Length: 3:33 (single version); 4:38 (album version)
- Label: V2
- Songwriter(s): Kirsty MacColl; Pete Glenister; Dave Ruffy
- Producer(s): Pete Glenister; Kirsty MacColl; Dave Ruffy

Kirsty MacColl singles chronology
| "Days" (1995) | "Mambo de la Luna" (1999) | "In These Shoes?" (2000) |

"Mambo de la Luna" is a song by British singer and songwriter Kirsty MacColl, which was released in 1999 as the lead single from her fifth studio album Tropical Brainstorm. It was written and produced by MacColl, Pete Glenister and Dave Ruffy.

A music video was filmed to promote the single. It was directed by Rob O'Connor and produced by Robert Style.

== Critical reception ==
Upon its release, Neil Spencer of The Observer commented in a review of Tropical Brainstorm: "Tracks like "Mambo de la Luna" follow the same upbeat curve [as "In These Shoes?"] in pursuit of MacColl's desire to make 'a happy record'." Billboard commented: "Tropical Brainstorm contains some of the artist's most vibrant work in years, including the electro-leaning textures of "Mambo de la Luna"." Fiona Sturges of The Independent felt the song "extols the virtues of [MacColl's] new-found paradise".

Rick Anderson of AllMusic selected the song as an AMG Pick Track and described it as being "all about the flavor of life in Cuba". Larry Printz of The Morning Call considered the song "Latin-flavored" and an example of MacColl's ability to write "sunny tunes". Tom Moon of The Philadelphia Inquirer commented: "MacColl's uptight phrasing (coupled with attempts at singing in Spanish) mars the otherwise buoyant "Mambo de la Luna"."

== Track listing ==
12" single (Italian release) and CD single (European release)

1. "Mambo de la Luna" (UR Craze Remix) - 6:07
2. "Mambo de la Luna" (UR Craze Remix Edit) - 3:50
3. "Mambo de la Luna" (UR Work In Italy) - 6:20
4. "Mambo de la Luna" (UR Work In Italy Remix Edit) - 3:45
5. "Mambo de la Luna" (Album Version) - 4:37

12" single (UK promo)

1. "Mambo de la Luna" (Mint Royale Mix) - 5:36
2. "Mambo de la Luna" (Mint Royale Version) - 5:09

CD single (UK release)

1. "Mambo de la Luna" - 3:33
2. "Golden Heart" - 3:24
3. "Things Happen" - 8:08

CD single (European release)

1. "Mambo de la Luna" - 3:33
2. "Mambo de la Luna" (Mint Royale Mix) - 5:36
3. "Mambo de la Luna" (Mint Royale Version) - 5:09

CD single (European release)

1. "In These Shoes?" - 3:40
2. "In These Shoes?" (UR Crazy Remix) - 3:40
3. "In These Shoes?" (UR Crazy Remix Edit) - 3:40
4. "In These Shoes?" (P Mix) - 3:40
5. "My Affair" (Live) - 3:52

== Personnel ==
- Kirsty MacColl - vocals
- Pete Glenister - guitar
- Dave Ruffy - drums
- Felix Gonzalez - Cuban rap, backing vocals
- Ernesto Estruch, Gabriel Fonseca, Omar Puente - backing vocals

Production

- Pete Glenister, Kirsty MacColl, Dave Ruffy - producers
- Lee Groves - additional programming
- Jeremy Wheatley - mixing
- UR Production, Mint Royale - remixes

Other

- Stylorouge - design, illustration

== Charts ==
| Chart (1999) | Peak position |
|---|---|
| UK Singles Chart | 89 |
| UK Independent Singles (OCC) | 24 |
