= Any Time Now (TV series) =

- Genre: Comedy drama
- Starring: Angeline Ball; Susan Lynch; Zara Turner
- Theme music composer: Kirsty MacColl
- Opening theme: "In These Shoes?"
- Country of origin: Ireland
- Original language: English
- No. of series: 1
- No. of episodes: 6

Original release
- Network: BBC One (United Kingdom) / RTÉ One (Republic of Ireland)
- Release: 20 May – 10 September 2002

Any Time Now is a 2002 co-produced six-part comedy-drama by RTÉ and BBC Northern Ireland.

The show initially aired on BBC One Northern Ireland and RTÉ One in 2002. The show was filmed in Dublin, Republic of Ireland and Belfast, in Northern Ireland.

== Concept ==
Anytime Now is an Irish contemporary six-part drama series, set against the backdrop of the newly thriving and cosmopolitan Dublin, about the lives, loves, and libidos of three lifelong friends. Nora Moggin (played by Angelina Ball), Kate O'Dowd (played by Zara Turner) and Stevie McCutcheon (played by Susan Lynch) live in Dublin. They have a combined age of 99. Between them they have slept with 47 men, broken 11 hearts, drunk approximately 5000 pints, bought one house, buried two parents, failed one marriage and produced one baby. They've known each other long enough to believe that their friendship, at least, is invincible

== Cast ==
- Angeline Ball
- Susan Lynch
- Zara Turner
- Ciarán McMenamin (Johnny)
- Frankie McCafferty (Declan Carthy)
- Patrick O'Kane (Colin)
- Owen Roe (Frank O'Halloran)
- Brid Brennan (Emily Moggin)
- Ruth McCabe (Margaret McCutcheon).

== Theme song ==
The theme song is "In These Shoes?" by Kirsty MacColl.
