= Waterfront (band) =

Welsh pop duo

- Origin: Cardiff, Wales
- Genres: Pop
- Years active: 1987–1991; 2000–present
- Labels: Polydor Records, Chordamundo Records
- Members: Chris Duffy; Phil Cilia

Waterfront are a 1980s Welsh pop duo, comprising Phil Cilia (full name Philip Laurence Cilia) and Chris Duffy (full name Christopher James Duffy), who had previously been in local Cardiff band The Official Secrets. The band met their manager, John Newman, when recording demos at his recording studio, Music Factory, in Cardiff. Newman remained with them as personal manager throughout their successful years.

== Career ==
In 1987, Waterfront were signed directly to EMI/SBK Productions by Charles Kopelman and Marty Bandier. The band went on to achieve chart success on both sides of the Atlantic. Waterfront was signed directly to Polydor via David Munns, the now ex-Vice Chairman and CEO of EMI Records.

The band were signed to Polydor Records, and are best known for their 1989 UK No. 17 and U.S. No. 10/U.S. AC No. 2 hit single, "Cry". Waterfront followed up "Cry" in the U.S. with another single, "Nature of Love", which hit No. 70 on the Billboard Hot 100.

They released their debut album, Waterfront, in 1989 with eventual sales reaching in excess of 600,000 worldwide. They are the first Welsh duo to achieve top 10 single status in the US. and were named BMI Songwriters of the Year in 1990. "Cry" was awarded as one of the 'most played singles on US radio' at the BMI 50th Anniversary Celebrations in Los Angeles, with the song now approaching one million plays on radio, resulting in membership to BMI's Million-Air Club.

In 1992, Chris Duffy released a solo album and single, also on Polydor Records, both entitled "All the Time in the World". The album contained three tracks co-written with Phil Cilia.

In May 2000, Duffy and Cilia reunited as Waterfront at the Kashmir Klub/BMI Showcase in London, England, a concert that was broadcast on the Internet. The group performed tracks like "Valentine's Day", "Cowboy Dreaming" and "Kingdom Comes".

In 2007, the reunited Waterfront secured single of the week for a two-week period on the O2/Napster mobile download portal, with a new acoustic alternative country track, "Valentine's Day".

In 2009, the band recorded songs for a new album, samples of which were available on their Myspace page. According to this, "The new material takes Waterfront in a completely new adult contemporary direction – allowing Phil and Chris to draw on their alternative country influences (Ryan Adams, Keith Urban, Bruce Springsteen, Tom Petty, Lucinda Williams, Counting Crows and the Wallflowers)."

A new 11-track album entitled Ghosts of the Good was released by Chordamundo Records in November 2011 and features collaborations from several contributing musicians, such as Jamie Crompton (ex-Suzi Quatro band lead guitarist). There are ten new songs and a bonus 'country makeover' version of their 1987 hit single "Cry". The album was released as a digital download and on CD, with the CD version being available exclusively via Tesco Entertainment.

On March 15, 2018, the band announced via their Facebook page that they "now own their complete publishing portfolio including their Billboard top ten hit 'Cry' and the UK top 40 'Nature of Love'."

The album Waterfront was uploaded to all streaming platforms by Universal in January 2020 and the song "Cry" amassed over 100,000 downloads on Spotify within the first 3 months of listing.

== Discography ==
=== Albums ===
Year	Album	Chart positions	
Year	Album	UK	US
1989	Waterfront: Released: 1989 (UK); 837 970-2 (CD); 837 970-1 (LP); 837 970-4 (MC); 1989 (US)	45	103
2011	Ghosts of the Good: Released: 2011 (UK); CMRCD001 (CD)	–	–

=== Singles ===
Year	Song	Peak chart positions				Album
Year	Song	US	US AC	NZ	UK	Album
1989	"Nature of Love"	70	44	—	63	Waterfront
1989	"Broken Arrow"	—	—	—	63	Waterfront
1989	"Cry"	10	2	30	17	Waterfront
1989	"Move On"	—	24	—	76	Waterfront
Releases listed in order of UK Chart peak date

Details relate to the UK releases.

- "Cry" – (1989) Polydor (WONCA1 – CD / WON1 – 7" / WONA1 – 7" Poster / WONB1 – 7" Box / WONP1 – 7" Pic disc / WONX1 – 12" / WONCS1 – Cassette)
- "Nature of Love" – (1989) Polydor (WONCD 2 – CD / WON2 – 7" / WONB2 – 7" Box / WONG2 – 7" Poster / WONX2 – 12")
- "Broken Arrow" – (1989) Polydor (WONCD 3 – CD / WON3 – 7" / WONB3 – 7" Box / WONG3 – 7" Poster / WONX3 – 12")
- "Move On" – (1989) Polydor (WONCD 5 – CD / WON5 – 7" / WONB5 – 7" Box / WONG5 – 7" Poster / WONP5 – 7" Pic disc / WONX5 – 12" / WONCS5 – Cassette)

== Notes ==
- (^) Catalogue numbers relate to the CD versions.
- Two album sampler promo CDs, each featuring four tracks, were also released (JOJO 1 / JOJO 2)
