= Prince Eyango =

- Born: Ndedi Eyango; 27 April 1960 (age 66); Nkongsamba, Cameroon
- Occupations: Singer-songwriter; Record producer
- Years active: 1983–present

Prince Eyango (born Ndedi Eyango; 27 April 1960 in Nkongsamba) is a Cameroonian singer, guitar player, songwriter, performer, and record producer. Popularly known as KING MOUAN NKUM, Le Roi Des Montages is the 3rd child of Eyango family.

== Career ==
He made his professional debut in 1983. By 1986 Ndedi Eyango developed a musical style merging both pop and traditional Cameroonian Makossa music. The son of a pastor, Ndedi Eyango sings in French, Pidgin English, Douala, and Mbo'o languages. His biggest hit, "You Must Calculer" won best song of the year in 1987, best selling album of the year and Eyango won the Cameroonian "Best Artist of the Year Award" .

As the founder and leader of his band "Les Montagnards", he revolutionized Makossa music by transforming it into a much more danceable form. He moved to the United States in 1993, where he has been based since. He is also a producer and owns a production company, "Preya Music" which has produced Longue Longue, Jacky Kingue, Tanus Foe, Papa Zoe, Marole Tchamba, Junior Eyango, Ndema System, and much more. All these accomplishments have brought him to be called one of the most influential music personalities in Cameroon.

Prince Eyango fuses world beat and African rhythms with choreography. In 2000, he was nominated for the World Music category at the Los Angeles Weekly Music Awards. In 2007 Prince Eyango recorded an album called "On Tourne La Page" and won the "Best Artist Come-back" award.

In 2009, he returned to Cameroon with one goal "to bring his U.S. music knowledge to expand his career as a musician and producer, and to promote the vibrant culture and musical talent in his country of birth", as he has said in many interviews. In 2012 his album "Apelle Moi" won the Canal D'or Music Award for the Best Male Artist of the Year.

In 2014 Prince Ndedi Eyango organised a fundraiser gala with Ascovime in Yaounde on 10 May 2014 to celebrate the CNN Heroes Award from a Cameroonian Doctor, Dr. Bwelle.

In 2015 after his 4-month concerts tour in Europe, Canada, and the US, Prince Eyango released his first gospel song "Merci Seigneur" and was nominated at Firma award in Nigeria for the best male artist.

== Family ==
He has four children, one boy Rodrigue NDEDI EYANGO and three daughters, Elsie NDEDI EYANGO, kamala NDEDI EYANGO and Mina NDEDI EYANGO

== Discography ==
1. Nweringa (1983) Ondoua records
2. Service libre (1985) – Dicks Records (LP)
3. Saluts les maries (1986) – BMCA Records (LP)
4. You Must Calculer (1987) – Tougata (LP)
5. Soul Botingo (1989) – (CD) Preya Music (LP)
6. Les problèmes (1991) – Toure Jim's Records (LP, CD reissue 1996)
7. Greatest Hits vol. 1 (1994) – Preya (CD)
8. Another Part of Me (1996) – Preya (CD)
9. Si tu me mens (1998) – Preya Music (CD)
10. You Go Pay (2000) – Preya Music (CD)
11. Métamorphose (2002) – Preya Music (CD)
12. The Very Best of Prince Eyango (2005) – (2 CD)
13. On Tourne la Page (2007) – Preya Music (CD)
14. Ecole D'amour (2009) – Preya Music (CD)
15. Une Autre enfance est possible (2010) – Preya Music (single)
16. Apelle Moi (2013) – Preya Music (CD)
17. la femme enceinte (2011) – Preya Music (single)
18. Merci Seigneur – (2015) – Preya Music (CD)
19. Je dis oui (2015) – Preya Music (single)
20. Les pleurs du Sahel (2016) – Preya Music (single)
21. Renaissance (2017) – album

Preya Music

1. Enlèves ta bouche (2023)

Preya Music Single
