= Walking Down Madison =

Single by Kirsty MacColl

from the album Electric Landlady
- Released: 7 May 1991
- Recorded: 1991
- Genre: Hip hop; pop rock; Madchester
- Label: Virgin
- Songwriters: Kirsty MacColl; Johnny Marr
- Producer: Steve Lillywhite

Kirsty MacColl singles chronology
"Miss Otis Regrets/Just One of Those Things" (1991)	"Walking Down Madison" (1991)	"My Affair" (1991)

Music video
- "Walking Down Madison" on YouTube

"Walking Down Madison" is a song by British singer and songwriter Kirsty MacColl featuring British DJ and rapper Aniff Cousins, released by Virgin Records on 7 May 1991 as the lead single from MacColl's third studio album, Electric Landlady (1991). It was written by her with Johnny Marr and produced by Steve Lillywhite. The song charted at No. 23 on the UK Singles Chart and impacted a number of US Billboard charts. Its accompanying music video was filmed on Madison Avenue in New York City.

== Background ==
The song was written after MacColl was searching for a new musical direction but instead found writer's block; she tried writing things and asked others to try but it failed to click. Meanwhile, Smiths guitar player Johnny Marr had just come away from the Smiths (they'd split up a week earlier) and had written a song with the intent of writing a dance-based guitar record. Despite it being the first song he had written after the split of the Smiths, he had kept it to one side for his own solo record after the presentation of some of his new material resulted in his friends stealing the tracks. Marr sent MacColl a tape containing the demo and other ideas as he was not interested in writing words at the time. Once MacColl had heard his guitar, she adjoined it with her lyrics and assembled a melody, and recorded the results at Electric Lady Studio. The track also sports a more hip-hop-influenced sound than her previous work and features production from her then-husband Steve Lillywhite. It also features rapper Aniff Cousins, who came to MacColl's attention after she heard the single "Black Whip" by his band Chapter and the Verse.

In a 1991 interview with Daily Record, MacColl commented on the song's social message, "I was in New York and became aware of the contrast between the enormous skyscrapers – these huge symbols of power and wealth – and people sleeping in shop doorways. Walking down Madison Avenue, it hits you all the time. It's terrible." She added to Melody Maker, "It was quite an observational song, I really did see a beaming boy from Harlem, even if it wasn't on Madison. It's a nod to Bob Marley, it's 'I Shot the Sheriff', really, isn't it! That idea of being pulled for something you may or may not have done, and that you're more likely to get pulled if you look a certain way."

"Walking Down Madison" was released as a single in the UK on 7 May 1991. It was also the opening track on MacColl's 1991 album Electric Landlady, on which it is the longest song. However, on most of her compilation albums, the 7" edit is used instead of the full album version. A selection of remixes by Howard Gray appeared across the various single formats.

== Critical reception ==
Upon its release, Music & Media noted the song's display of the "new styled MacColl" and described it as "match[ing] modern dance material as supplied by acts like Massive Attack or the Banderas". Paul Baldwin of the Northampton Chronicle & Echo considered the "rapping cum Was (Not Was) cum mixed up hip hop track" to be "an odd choice for the honey-voiced crooner", but noted that the "breakbeat bleeps and Cousins' rap are an oddly effective vehicle for Kirsty's clever beat Costelloesque vocal". James Hamilton from Record Mirror wrote, "The most incongruous sight in a record shop last week was a cluster of dreadlocked guys discussing with much head nodding approval the merits of folk/pop singer Kirsty, thanks to this gruffy muttering Aniff Cousins augmented jiggly, (0-)103.9-0bpm DNA featuring Suzanne Vega style remix, not as good as 'Tom's Diner' but a logical successor that looks like being fairly big."

Steve Stewart of the Aberdeen Press and Journal awarded four out of five stars and wrote, "A bit of everything thrown in here – dance beat, rap, screeching guitar and vocal harmonies. Kirsty has taken on board a 90s style and pulls it off." Terry Staunton of New Musical Express was more critical, describing the song as "overall a bad idea" on which MacColl "goes dance frenzy". He noted, "Her soft and sombre vocals are ill-matched against the shufflebeat [and] it doesn't quite give off the same sparks as the Suzanne Vega/DNA link-up on 'Tom's Diner'". Stanton felt the song "might dent the charts on novelty value" and described Cousins' rap as "ok", but felt MacColl was better suited on the "sugary pop" of her previous works "Days" and "Don't Come the Cowboy with Me Sonny Jim!".

In the US, Larry Flick of Billboard magazine described the song as a "credible pop/hip-hop track that comes off at times like a tougher version of Suzanne Vega's 'Tom's Diner'." He noted the "infectious melody", "intelligent lyrics", "slicing guitars" and "affecting rap" from Cousins. Pitchfork retrospectively commended the record as a "subtle, scathing takedown of the city’s neon facade".

== Music video ==
A music video was produced for the song. It was shot on location on Madison Avenue and features interspersed advertisements for Electric Landlady. It shows both a smartly dressed MacColl walking down Madison amidst smartly dressed business men during the daytime and a more-scruffily-dressed MacColl with women sleeping rough, the "beaming boy from Harlem with the air force coat" (which is mentioned in the lyrics of the song), a man with a knife on the A-train and other assorted characters at night whilst Londonbeat dance. Cousins appears both during the day and at night. The night-time characters arrive in a chauffeur-driven limousine and depart in it at the end of the video.

== Uses in other media ==
MacColl performed this song on Top of the Pops. Alison Moyet has covered this song live having been offered the chance to record it. Co-writer Johnny Marr has also covered the track. In addition, Iain Banks included it on Personal Effects, a CD intended as music to listen to whilst driving.

== Formats ==
- 7-inch single (UK, Europe and US) and cassette single (UK)
1. "Walking Down Madison" – 4:42
2. "One Good Thing" – 3:37
- 12-inch single (UK and Europe)
1. "Walking Down Madison" (Club Mix) – 6:35
2. "One Good Thing" – 3:37
3. "Walking Down Madison" (6am Ambient Mix) – 4:58
4. "Walking Down Madison" – 4:42
- 12-inch single (US)
1. "Walking Down Madison" (Club Mix) – 6:35
2. "Walking Down Madison" (Urban Mix) – 4:36
3. "Walking Down Madison" (Album Version) – 6:35
4. "Walking Down Madison" (6 A.M. Ambient Mix) – 4:58
- CD single (UK and Europe)
1. "Walking Down Madison" – 4:42
2. "One Good Thing" – 3:37
3. "Walking Down Madison" (6a.m. Ambient Mix) – 4:58
4. "Walking Down Madison" (Club Mix) – 6:35
- CD single (UK digipack)
1. "Walking Down Madison" (Urban Mix) – 4:36
2. "Days" – 3:01
3. "Darling Let's Have Another Baby" – 3:27
4. "Walking Down Madison" (LP Extended Mix) – 6:36
- CD single (US)
1. "Walking Down Madison" (7" Mix) – 4:40
2. "Walking Down Madison" (Extended Urban Mix) – 6:35
3. "Walking Down Madison" (Ye Olde Originale Mix) – 4:33
4. "Walking Down Madison" (Club Mix) – 6:34
5. "Walking Down Madison" (6 A.M. Ambient Mix) – 4:57

== Personnel ==
"Walking Down Madison"

- Kirsty MacColl – vocals
- Johnny Marr – guitar, keyboards
- Elliott Randall – guitar
- Trevor Gray – bass synthesiser, organ, programming
- Guy Pratt – bass
- David Palmer – drums
- Jody Linscott – percussion
- George Chandler – backing vocals
- Jimmy Chambers – backing vocals
- Aniff Cousins – rap

Production

- Steve Lillywhite – production ("Walking Down Madison", "One Good Thing"), additional production and mix ("Walking Down Madison")
- Howard Gray – additional production and mix ("Walking Down Madison"), additional production and remixing ("Walking Down Madison": '6am Ambient Mix', 'Club Mix', 'Urban Mix')

Other

- Kirsty MacColl – illustration, design
- Charles Dickins – photography
- Bill Smith Studios – design

== Charts ==
Chart (1991)	Peak position
Australia (ARIA)	58
Netherlands (Single Top 100)	85
Europe (Eurochart Hot 100)	66
Europe (European Airplay Top 50)	31
Europe (European Hit Radio)	17
Ireland (IRMA)	12
Luxembourg (Radio Luxembourg)	11
UK Singles (OCC)	23
UK Dance (Music Week)	21
UK Playlist Chart (Music Week)	10
UK Club Chart (Record Mirror)	64
US Hot Dance Music Club Play (Billboard)	18
US Hot Dance Music 12-inch Singles Sales (Billboard)	36
US Modern Rock Tracks (Billboard)	4
