= Startled Insects =

English jazz fusion band

- Also known as: The Insects
- Origin: Bristol, England
- Genres: Jazz fusion, electronic
- Years active: 1984–present
- Labels: Antenna, Antilles, 2ndSight
- Members: Bob Locke; Tim Norfolk
- Past members: Richard Grassby-Lewis
- Website: theinsects.co.uk

Startled Insects, later known as the Insects, are an instrumental English jazz fusion band.

== History ==
Startled Insects began around 1983 in Bristol, England, as a collective of three producers/multi-instrumentalists, Tim Norfolk, Bob Locke and Richard Grassby-Lewis. Little information has ever been published about the band – the participants' names did not appear on any of the album sleeves, nor were any pictures ever published. Nevertheless, the band managed to generate considerable excitement with their first self-published EP and single, enough that Island Records signed them to their new Antilles New Directions label. Their first album for Island, Curse of the Pheromones (1987), was an underground hit, and the group performed several well-received multi-media tours using film-makers drawn from various backgrounds, such as Frank Passingham, Dave Borthwick, with whom they later produced the sound-track to The Secret Adventures of Tom Thumb and Dave Alex Riddett also of Aardman Animations, as well as Richard Kwietniowsi who later directed Love and Death on Long Island. In 1990, they were commissioned by the BBC to score a ground-breaking 90-minute documentary entitled Lifepulse – a Natural Thriller, which attempted to tell the story of evolution on Earth using nothing but BBC Wildlife footage and music. In 1995, they provided the score for another BBC documentary, The Private Life of Plants.

In 1996, Richard Grassby-Lewis officially left the group. Tim Norfolk and Bob Locke continued on as simply the Insects (dropping "Startled"). In addition to production duties for various artists they started co-writing for Bristol bands such as Massive Attack, for whom they wrote two hit songs for their Protection album – "Karma Coma" and "Euro Child". They co-wrote and arranged "The Hunter Gets Captured by the Game" as featured on the Batman Forever soundtrack and "I Want You" for Madonna's Something to Remember. Meanwhile, Richard Grassby-Lewis has also continued production duties for artists such as Najma Akhtar as well as TV and film scoring work.

The Insects began to receive commissions to write music for other documentary specials, including several National Geographic Specials. One of these, Life at the Edge, won them the Emmy Award for Best Score. By 1997, the Insects had written music for several documentaries, an animated feature film (The Secret Adventures of Tom Thumb), many commercials, two CD-ROMs and a feature film, Love and Death on Long Island, starring John Hurt and Jason Priestley. They also wrote music for Aardman Animations' Angry Kid. More recently they have written scores for XX/XY (starring Mark Ruffalo), a 2nd Richard Kwietniowski film Owning Mahowny (featuring Philip Seymour Hoffman and Minnie Driver), and the 2016 BBC TV series The Living and the Dead. They have also received critical acclaim for the work on the ITV series Wire in the Blood, now in its sixth season, and scored Alex Garland's 2020 miniseries Devs.

As well as film and TV work, the Insects continue to write and produce for other artists. They have produced Alison Moyet's gold-selling album, Hometime. Other assignments include the 2000 track "Human" as featured on Goldfrapp's debut album Felt Mountain. Most recent projects include a collaboration with Sean Cook (formerly of Spiritualized and Lupine Howl) called the Flies (their album All Too Human was released in 2007) and the Mother Beef, an experimental dirty garage rock n' roll band founded in Bristol 2010/2011.

== Discography ==
=== Startled Insects ===
- Startled Insects (a.k.a. Overzoom) (12" EP, Antenna, 1984)
- Underworld/Black Spring (12" single, Antenna, 1985)
- Curse of the Pheromones (Island/Antilles, 1987)
- Lifepulse (Island Records, 1991)
- The Secret Adventures of Tom Thumb (Soundtrack) (BBC, 1993
- The Mini-LPs (Startled Insects + "Underworld"/"Black Spring" + bonus tracks, 2ndSight, 1998)

=== The Insects (partial list) ===
- Love and Death on Long Island (Soundtrack) (with Richard Grassby-Lewis and Jon Hassell, OceanDeep, 1998)
- Wild Indonesia (Soundtrack) (with Richard Grassby-Lewis, 2ndSight, 1999)
- Angry Kid (Soundtrack) (Aardman Animations, 2000)
- Owning Mahowny (Soundtrack) (with Richard Grassby-Lewis and Jon Hassell, 2ndSight, 2003)
- Flames of Passion (Soundtrack) (with Richard Grassby-Lewis, 2ndSight, 2003)
- Music from the Film XX/XY (Thrive, 2003)
- Monsters We Met (Soundtrack) (BBC, 2004)
- Seconds from Disaster (Soundtrack) (National Geographic, 2006)
- Wire in the Blood (Soundtrack) (Coastal, 2008)
- A Place of Execution (Soundtrack) (Coastal, 2008)
- 44 Inch Chest (Soundtrack) (Momentum, 2009)
- Everest: Beyond the Limit (Soundtrack) (Discovery, 2010)
- Death Comes to Pemberley (TV series) (Soundtrack) (BBC, 2013)
- Atlantic Heart (Soundtrack) (2015)
- The Living and the Dead (TV series) (Soundtrack), self-issued, 2016)
- Becoming Cary Grant (Soundtrack) (Yuzu, 2016)
- South Korea: Earth's Hidden Wilderness (Soundtrack) (BBC, 2018)
- Fabienne Verdier: Moving with the World (Soundtrack) (2018)
- Hanna (TV series) (Soundtrack) (with Ben Salisbury, Geoff Barrow & Yann McCullough, Invada & Lakeshore Entertainment, 2019)
- Devs (Soundtrack) (with Ben Salisbury & Geoff Barrow, Invada & Lakeshore Entertainment, 2020)

=== Richard Grassby-Lewis ===
- Music from The Private Life of Plants (2ndSight, 1995)
- Dramas of the Natural World (library music, Atmospheres, 1995)
- Borneo - Island in the Clouds (Soundtrack) (1998)
- Vivid (with Najma Akhtar, Mondo Melodia, 2002)
- dark:light (with Mark Anderson, 2ndSight, 2007)
- Best of the Rest of RGL (2ndSight, 2013)
