= Pete Glenister =

English musician, songwriter

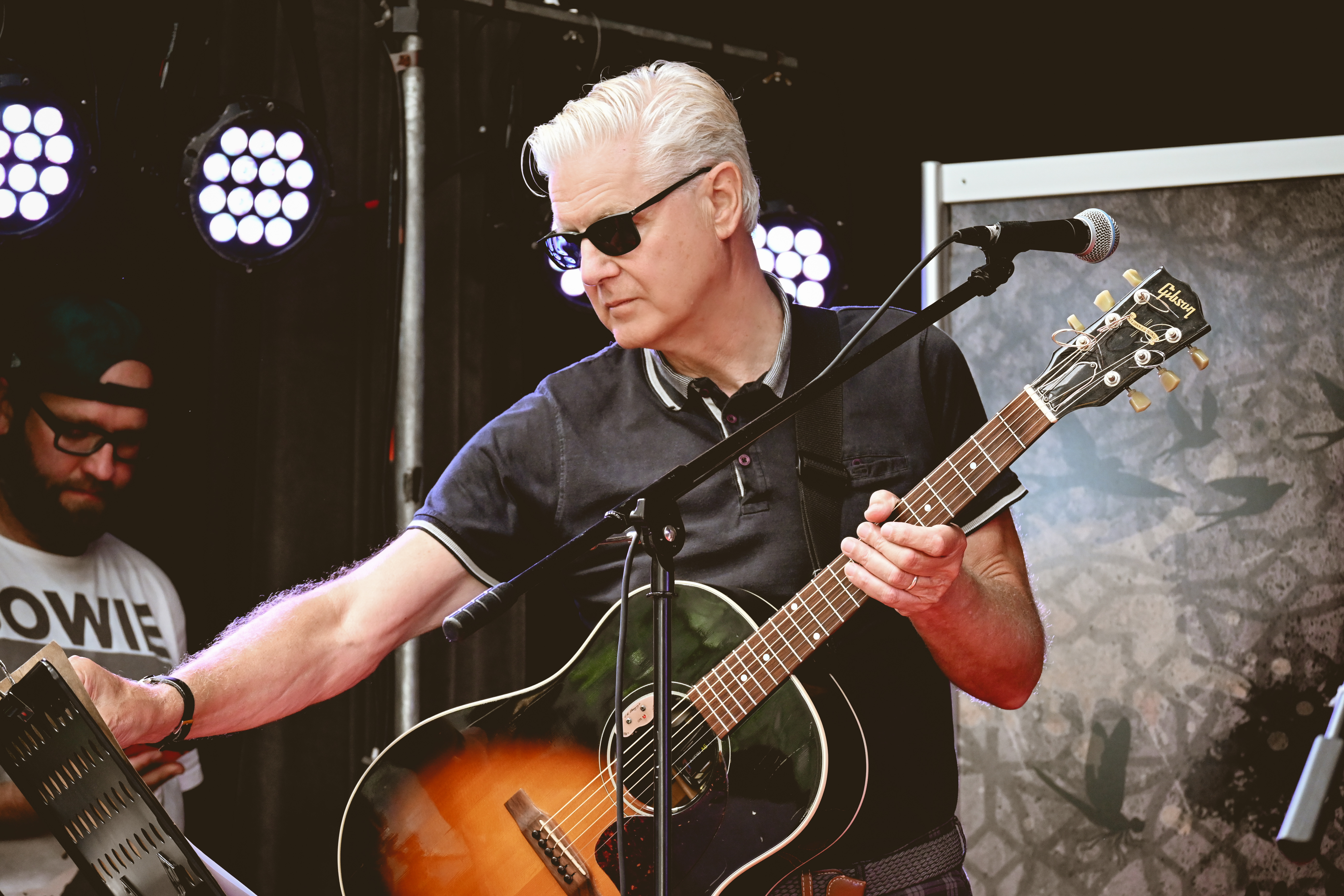
- Glenister in 2021

Background information
- Genres: New wave
- Occupations: Guitarist; songwriter; record producer
- Instrument: Guitar
- Formerly of: The Hitmen

Pete Glenister is an English guitarist, songwriter and record producer, known for his collaborations with Alison Moyet and Kirsty MacColl. He has also worked with a number of other artists including Anni-Frid Lyngstad, Bruce Foxton, Terence Trent D'Arby, Bros, E. G. Daily, Mary Coughlan, Geoffrey Williams, Five Thirty, Bryan Ferry and Raphael Gualazzi.

== Background ==
Glenister was the guitarist in the new wave band the Hitmen, who produced two albums, Aim for the Feet (1980) and Torn Together (1981). He went on to form a long creative partnership with Kirsty MacColl, contributing guitar and co-writing songs with the singer, which were included on her albums Kite (1989), Electric Landlady (1991), Titanic Days (1993) and Tropical Brainstorm (2000).

Glenister began writing and working with Alison Moyet after a brief spell as guitarist on her 1987 world tour. He co-wrote, performed on and produced many of the tracks on Moyet's 1991 album Hoodoo and 1994's Essex. He co-wrote most of the material with Moyet for her 2002 album Hometime, and co-wrote and produced 2007's The Turn.

== Selected discography ==
- The Hitmen – Aim for the Feet (1980, guitar/songwriter)
- The Hitmen – Torn Together (1981, guitar/songwriter)
- New Asia – Gates (1982, guitar/songwriter)
- Frida – Shine (1984, guitar/songwriter)
- Bruce Foxton – Touch Sensitive (1984, guitar/songwriter)
- Anne Linnet & Marquis De Sade – Hvid Magi (1985, guitar)
- Anne Linnet & Marquis De Sade – En Elsker (1986, guitar)
- Bronski Beat – Truthdare Doubledare (1986, guitar)
- State of Play – Balancing the Scales (1986, guitar)
- Double – Dou3le (1987, guitar)
- Terence Trent D'Arby – Introducing the Hardline According to Terence Trent D'Arby (1987, guitar)
- Bros – Push (1988, guitar)
- E. G. Daily – Lace Around the Wound (1989, guitar/songwriter/producer)
- Kirsty MacColl – Kite (1989, guitar/songwriter)
- Waterfront – Waterfront (1989, guitar)
- Dreams Come True – Dreams Come True (1989, guitar)
- Mary Coughlan – Uncertain Pleasures (1990, guitar/songwriter/producer)
- Kirsty MacColl – Electric Landlady (1991, guitar/songwriter)
- Alison Moyet – Hoodoo (1991)
- Geoffrey Williams – Bare (1992, guitar/songwriter/producer)
- Helen Watson – Companion Gal (1992, guitar)
- Kirsty MacColl – Titanic Days (1993, guitar)
- Alison Moyet – Essex (1994, guitar/songwriter/producer)
- Deanna – Divide and Continue (1995, guitar/songwriter)
- Fischer-Z – Stream (1995, guitar/songwriter/producer)
- Juno Reactor – Bible of Dreams (1997, guitar)
- Kirsty MacColl – Tropical Brainstorm (2000, guitar/songwriter/producer)
- Beth Gibbons & Rustin Man – Out of Season (2002, guitar)
- Bryan Ferry – Frantic (2002, guitar)
- Alison Moyet – Hometime (2002, songwriter/guitar)
- Alison Moyet – The Turn (2007, guitar/songwriter/producer)
- Jim Lauderdale – London Southern (2017, guitar)
- Mary Coughlan – Life Stories (2020, guitar/songwriter/producer)
