= Jules Shear discography =

- Studio albums: 12
- EPs: 2
- Compilation albums: 2
- Singles: 8

Jules Shear is an American singer, songwriter, and guitarist. His discography consists of 12 studio albums, 2 compilations, 2 EPs, and 8 singles. In addition to his work with Funky Kings, Jules and the Polar Bears, Reckless Sleepers, and Shear Shazar, his compositions have been recorded by many other artists.

== Studio albums ==
- 1983: Watch Dog (EMI America)
- 1985: The Eternal Return (EMI America)
- 1989: The Third Party (I.R.S.)
- 1991: Unplug This (Polydor)
- 1992: The Great Puzzle (Polydor)
- 1994: Healing Bones (Island)
- 1998: Between Us (High Street)
- 2000: Allow Me (Zoë)
- 2004: Sayin' Hello To The Folks (Valley Entertainment)
- 2006: Dreams Don't Count (Mad Dragon)
- 2008: More (Funzalo)
- 2013: Longer to Get to Yesterday (CD Baby)
- 2017: One More Crooked Dance
- 2020: Slower (Funzalo Records)

== Compilation albums ==
- 1986: Demo-Itis (Enigma)
- 1993: Horse Of A Different Color: The Jules Shear Collection (1976–1989) (Razor & Tie)

== EPs ==
- 1983: Jules (EMI America)
- 1992: The Trap Door (Polydor) - "The Trap Door" / "His Audience Has Gone To Sleep" / "She Makes Things Happen" / "Nothing Is Left Behind"

== Singles ==
- 1983: "Whispering Your Name" / "The Longest Drink" (EMI America)
- 1983: "Whispering Your Name" / "I Need It" (EMI America) - 12" promo
- 1984: "When Love Surges (Extended Version)" / "When Love Surges (Instrumental)" (EMI America) - 12"
- 1985: "Steady" / "Still I See You" (EMI America)
- 1985: "If She Knew What She Wants" / "Chain Within Chain" (EMI America)
- 1994: "Listen To What She Says" (Polydor) - promo
- 1999: "The Last In Love" (High Street) featuring Paula Cole - promo
- 2000: "The More That I'm Around You" (Zoë / Rounder) - promo

== As a member of Funky Kings ==
- 1976: Funky Kings (Arista)

== As a member of Jules and the Polar Bears ==
=== Albums ===
- 1978: Got No Breeding (Columbia)
- 1978: Fənĕtĭks (Columbia)
- 1980: Bad For Business (Columbia) - not officially released until 1996

=== EPs ===
- 1980: Economy Package (Columbia)

=== Singles ===
- 1978: "You Just Don't Wanna Know" (Columbia) - promo
- 1979: "Good Reason" / "All Caked Up" (Columbia)
- 1980: "Alive Alone" / "The Smell Of Home" (CBS)
- 1980: "The Smell Of Home" (CBS) - 12" promo
- 1980: "The Smell Of Home" / "Love Played A Game" / "Alive Alone" (CBS)

== As a member of Reckless Sleepers ==
=== Albums ===
- 1988: Big Boss Sounds! (I.R.S.)

=== Singles ===
- 1988: "If We Never Meet Again (Edit)" / "When You Get That Look" (I.R.S.)
- 1988: "This Heart" (I.R.S.) - 12" promo

== As a member of Raisins in the Sun ==
- 2001: Raisins in the Sun (Rounder / Evangeline)

== As a member of Shear Shazar (with Pal Shazar) ==
=== Albums ===
- 2013: Shear Shazar (CD Baby)

=== EPs ===
- 2014: Mess You Up (CD Baby)

== As composer ==
=== 1977 - 1989 ===
- 1977: Olivia Newton-John - Making a Good Thing Better (MCA) - track 8, "So Easy to Begin"
- 1980: Ian Matthews - Spot Of Interference (Ariola) - track 5, "Driftwood from Disaster"
- 1981: Art Garfunkel - Scissors Cut (Columbia) - track 5, "So Easy to Begin"
- 1983: Cyndi Lauper - She's So Unusual (Portrait) - track 6, "All Through the Night"; track 8, "I'll Kiss You" (co-written with Cyndi Lauper)
- 1985: Elliot Easton - Change No Change (Elektra) - all songs co-written with Elliot Easton
- 1986: Bangles - Different Light (Columbia) - track 7, "If She Knew What She Wants"
- 1987: The Williams Brothers - Two Stories (Warner Bros.) - track 5, "Rain Came Down"
- 1988: Tommy Conwell And The Young Rumblers - Rumble (CBS) - track 3, "If We Never Meet Again"; track 9, "Tell Me What You Want Me To Be" (co-written with Tommy Conwell)
- 1988: Ian Matthews - Walking a Changing Line (Windham Hill) - wrote all songs except for "Dream Sequence"
- 1988: 'Til Tuesday - Everything's Different Now - track 1, "Everything's Different Now" (co-written with Matthew Sweet); track 5, "(Believed You Were) Lucky" (co-written with Aimee Mann)
- 1989: Tommy Keene - Based on Happy Times (Geffen) - track 5, "When Our Vows Break"; track 9, "If We Run Away"

=== 1990 - 1999 ===
- 1991: Marshall Crenshaw - Life's Too Short (MCA) - track 9, "Everything's the Truth" (co-written with Marshall Crenshaw)
- 1991: Roger McGuinn - Back from Rio (Arista) - track 10, "If We Never Meet Again"
- 1993: Richard Barone - Clouds Over Eden (Mesa) - track 7, "Miss Jean" (co-written with Richard Barone)
- 1993: Aimee Mann - Whatever (Imago) - track 4, "Could've Been Anyone" (co-written with Aimee Mann and Marty Willson-Piper)
- 1993: The Pursuit Of Happiness - The Downward Road (Mercury) - track 15, "A Villa In Portugal" (co-written with Moe Berg)
- 1993: Soulsister - Simple Rule (EMI) - track 9, "Locks and Keys" (co-written with Jan Leyers and Paul Michiels)
- 1994: Alison Moyet - Essex (Columbia) - track 3, "Whispering Your Name"
- 1995: Jimmy Somerville - Dare to Love (London) - track 9, "Too Much Of A Good Thing" (co-written with Jimmy Somerville)
- 1996: Frente! - Shape (Mushroom) - track 9, "So Mad" (co-written with Angie Hart)
- 1997: 10,000 Maniacs - Love Among the Ruins (Geffen) - track 2, "Love Among the Ruins"; track 9, "You Won't Find Me There"; track 11, "Shining Light" (all songs co-written with 10,000 Maniacs)

=== 2000 - present ===
- 2004: Tony Furtado - These Chains (Funzalo) - track 4, "Standing in the Rain" (co-written with Tony Furtado)
- 2005: Cyndi Lauper - The Body Acoustic (BMG / Sony Music) - track 2, "All Through the Night"
- 2005: John Hall - Rock Me on the Water (Siren Songs) - track 11, "Every Place"
- 2006: Dar Williams - My Better Self (Razor & Tie) - track 3, "Echoes" (co-written with Rob Hyman and Stewart Lerman)
- 2007: Kelly Willis - Translated from Love (Rykodisc) - track 3, "Don't Know Why" (co-written with Chuck Prophet and Kelly Willis)
- 2008: Mick Overman - Mister Double Happiness (Max) - track 3, "If She Knew What She Wants"
- 2014: Winterpills - Echolalia (Signature Sounds) - track 4, "Open Your Eyes"

== As producer ==
- 1982: Slow Children - Mad About Town (Ensign)
- 1989: The Jolly Boys - Pop 'n' Mento (Cooking Vinyl)
- 1995: Pal Shazar - There's A Wild Thing In The House (Transatlantic)
- 2006: Pal Shazar - The Morning After (Shiffaroe)

== Also appears on ==
- 1980: Danny Kortchmar - Innuendo (Asylum) - vocals
- 1982: Ric Ocasek - Beatitude (Geffen) - background vocals on track 3, "Prove"
- 1993: The Waterboys - Dream Harder (Geffen) - background vocals on track 3, "Preparing to Fly"
- 2008: various artists - Big Blue Ball (Real World) - backing vocals on track 7, "Burn You Up, Burn You Down")
- 2009: Killian Mansfield - Somewhere Else (429 Records) - vocals
