= Pop 'n' Mento =

Studio album by The Jolly Boys
- Released: 11 September 1989
- Recorded: 1989, Jamaica
- Genres: Mento; calypso; Jamaican folk; world; worldbeat
- Length: 47:08
- Labels: First Warning; Cooking Vinyl
- Producer: Jules Shear

The Jolly Boys chronology
At Club Caribbean (1986)	Pop 'n' Mento (1989)	Sunshine 'n' Water (1991)

Pop 'n' Mento is the third album by Jamaican mento band the Jolly Boys, released in September 1989 by American label First Warning and British label Cooking Vinyl. The album was produced by American singer-songwriter Jules Shear, who discovered the Jolly Boys performing in a Port Antonio hotel. He digitally recorded the group in one take, using a minimal set-up to accommodate the group's acoustic instrumentation. The record features a set of mento standards, and mixed elements from the genre's past with contemporary sounds.

The promotion for Pop 'n' Mento focused on the mento genre and Jamaican folk authenticity, helping the album appeal to a world music audience. The album was also popular on college radio in the United States, leading to a reissue in July 1990 via Rykodisc. The record received critical acclaim, including from critics who recognised mento as a forebear to reggae, and greatly increased the band's international profile.

== Background and recording ==
Formed in Port Antonio in the early 1950s, the Jolly Boys spent decades performing in hotels and were stalwarts of the city's tourist entertainment, having also worked with development organisations in the area. During the 1950s, the group received a boost in interest when Errol Flynn hired them as a house band for parties in his Jamaican holiday home. Though they had a local identity as a calypso band, due to their dance troupe attire, a more accurate description of the band's music was mento, a Jamaican descendant of calypso which mixed Afro-Caribbean and Latin rhythms, English and French folk music and New Orleans rhythm and blues, and typically featured gently risqué lyrics. In the 1930s and 40s, mento was the most popular music in Jamaica, but in subsequent decades its popularity faded next to music with electric instrumentation and the arrival of ska and reggae, two genres derived from mento.

American singer-songwriter and producer Jules Shear, known for writing hits for Cyndi Lauper, Alison Moyet and the Bangles, holidayed at the Trident Hotel on the coast of Port Antonio in 1989, where he discovered the group performing. Inspired by their dynamic performance, he offered to produce a studio album by the group. According to writer Steve MacDonald, the decision to record Pop 'n' Mento "appears to have been [on] a whim". The album is a digital recording of the group, captured in one take in a hotel room. McDonald speculates that Shear "[seems] to have simply miked everyone and let the tape roll." The Daily Advertiser wrote that Shear recorded the band's record for fans of world music. Though Pop 'n' Mento has been described as the Jolly Boys' first album, the group had recorded Jamaica: The Roots of Reggae in the 1970s and 1986's At Club Caribbean. The album was mastered at Barry Diament Audio.

== Composition ==
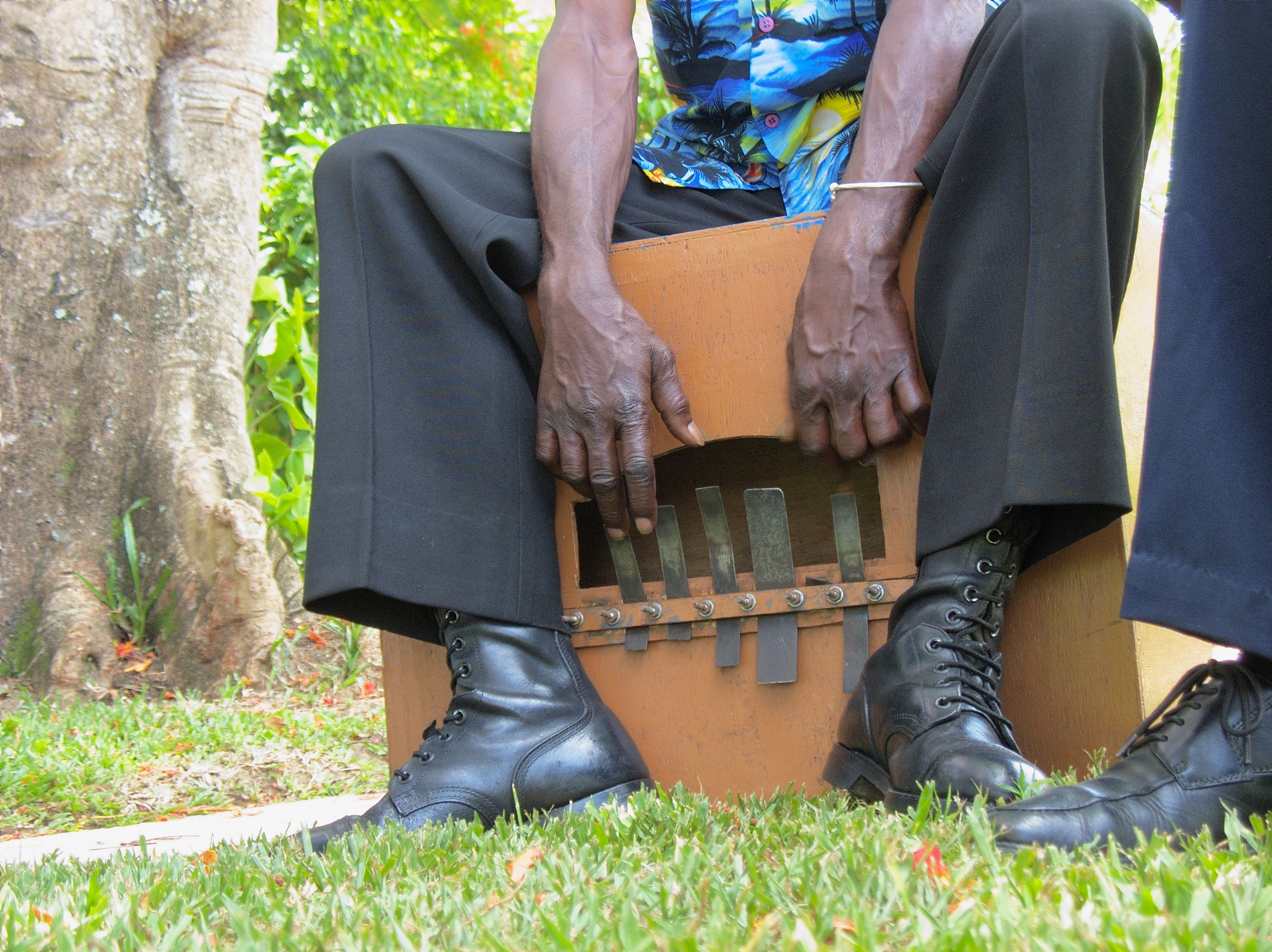
A marimbula or rhumba box

Using only rustic, acoustic instruments, the Jolly Boys' lineup on Pop 'n' Mento comprises Allan Swymmer on vocals and bongos, Moses Dean on banjo, Noel Howard on guitar and Joseph Bennett on marimbula – the latter of which is known as a rhumba box in Jamaica – as well as background vocals from the latter trio. As explained by author Daniel T. Neely, the album's liner notes characterise the music as combing syncopated melodies, elements of reggae and calypso, African-style rhythms, Latin drums and touches of British sea chanties, creating a style of mento that mixes elements from the genre's past with contemporary sounds, thus breaking with the mento tradition on the Jamaican north coast. "Pop 'n' mento" is the group's description of their style.

The album covers a selection of Jamaican mento standards, including songs known internationally like "Shaving Cream", "Back to Back (Belly to Belly)" and "Big Bamboo". According to writer Nick Griffiths, the group's version of mento on the album is "not only a play on calypso or reggae, but a play on words (with titles like 'Touch Me Tomato' and 'Big Bamboo') and a light-hearted, what-the-hell look at life", noting the humorous lyrics and overall simplicity. He added that the resonant bongos and "coolly plucked banjo" cushion Swymmer's "laidback, reggae-tinged vocals", with the acoustic guitar and rhumba box being used for enhancement. According to McDonald, the rhumba box provides a strong bass end. Roger Catlin of Albuquerque Journal highlighted the "light music with saucy lyrics".

== Release and aftermath ==
Released on 11 September 1989, Pop 'n' Mento was one of two album releases that launched the BMG-funded independent label First Warning, alongside the eponymous debut of Hex, issued the same day. According to Dave DiMartino of Billboard, the label was to be used as a springboard to develop new artists and launch them "in the alternative marketplace before stepping up to the majors." Magazine adverts described Pop 'n' Mento as exhibiting "the sunny and sexy sounds of authentic Jamaican folk music." The Jolly Boys toured Europe following the album's release, and played the Vista lobby in New York City as part of music industry event MM89. In the United States, the band found favour with college radio, who enjoyed the "acoustic island novelty" of their music, which led to Rykodisc picking up First Warning for wider distribution. The Rykodisc-First Warning reissue took place on 13 July 1990. In the United Kingdom, the album was released through Cooking Vinyl. The record also made reached the CJSW-FM Top 10 in Canada.

Pop 'n' Mento became one in a trilogy of 'live' albums by the group produced between 1989 and 1991, alongside Sunshine 'n' Water and Beer Joint in Tailoring (both 1991). According to George Plasketes, "the traditional trilogy never reached revival or Graceland proportions, but like many other world music missionary explorations, the series of recordings provided important [small scale] exposure and documentation within the global and American music marketplaces." He compared Shear's projects with the group to Keith Richards' work with fellow Jamaican folk band Wingless Angels. Neely deemed Pop 'n' Mento and its follow-ups to reframe the Jolly Boys' musical identity. Adding that they were released "as the world music phenomenon was cresting", he considered the marketing emphasis on the term 'mento' to be "an indigenizing move, one that authenticated the encounter between consumers and Jamaican music's 'real' roots and influenced the way people from abroad got to know them", and felt that the Jolly Boys benefitted from becoming known as a mento (rather than calyso) group as it helped their relationship with the Jamaican Tourist Board, who helped facilitate their international publicity trips, and gave them wider international exposure than other mento bands. Plasketes said: "Through these four elder musicians, Shear uncovered 'mento'".

== Critical reception ==
Professional ratings
Review scores
Source	Rating
AllMusic	4.5/5 stars
The News and Observer	3.5/5 stars
Select	3/5 stars
The Village Voice	B+

Pop 'n' Mento received wide acclaim from music critics, some of whom highlighted mento as a precursor to reggae. David Wild of The News and Observer wrote that the album captures the Jolly Boys' "laidback island charm", and provided a fine reminder that "there was beautiful music being made in Jamaica well before Bob Marley and the Wailers found their rastaman vibration." He also prasied the "nice, light touch" of Shear's production. Robert Christgau of The Village Voice said, despite how it was advertised, mento is not "roots' roots" but rather "secondhand calypso that's been tourist music since Harry Belafonte was a folkie", but added that the style is "good dirty fun", writing that Shear could not resist Swymmer's nonchalant singing or Deans' languid banjo, and "did the world a turn by getting them down."

Paul Willistein of The Morning Call reviewed the album alongside the Jonathan Demme-compiled Konbit: Burning Rhythms of Haiti, describing them as "interesting world-beat offerings from two unlikely musical anthropologists". He noted the album's relaxed mento style, using Harry Belfatone's "Day-O (The Banana Boat Song)" as a point of reference, and added: "It's kind of touristy, 'Yellow Bird' beach cabana music, but sprightly so." He added that in representing "simple island pleasures", the album showcased "the real Kokomo". Nick Griffiths of Select considered the album's main strength to be its simplicity, writing that the album is never over-produced or cluttered. However, he did feel the basic arrangements lead to "a diminishing interest threshold," and added that the Jollies' "penchant for fruit and veg references" gets excessive.

In a retrospective review, Steven McDonald of AllMusic named Pop 'n' Mento an "Album Pick", singling out the uniqueness of the Jolly Boys in the marketplace and comparing Shear's recording of the album to the album to Alan Lomax's documenting of 1930s and 40s blues artists. He praised the recording techniques and Swymmer's joyful singing, concluding: "Pop 'n' Mento is almost a time and space device...it really does take you to another place and another time." The authors of The Rough Guide to Jamaica (2003) highly recommend the album and its follow-up Sunshine 'n' Water, writing: "Sunny and lewd, this is classic good time mento from a band who have been playing it for decades."

== Track listing ==
All songs traditional and arranged by The Jolly Boys.

1. "Mother & Wife" – 4:28
2. "Love in the Cemetery" – 3:40
3. "River Come Down" – 2:58
4. "Ten Dollars to Two" – 3:23
5. "Banana" – 3:13
6. "Big Bamboo" – 4:39
7. "Ben Wood Dick"– 4:32
8. "Touch Me Tomato" – 4:01
9. "Shaving Cream" – 3:53
10. "Watermelon" – 3:35
11. "Back to Back (Belly to Belly)" – 4:35
12. "Nightfall" – 4:09

== Personnel ==
Adapted from the liner notes of Pop 'n' Mento

- Allan Swymmer – lead vocals, bongos
- Moses Deans – banjo, backing vocals, lead vocals (5)
- Noel Howard – guitar, backing vocals
- Joseph Bennett – marimbula, backing vocals
- Jules Shear – producer
