= Falling (Alison Moyet song) =

1993 single by Alison Moyet

Single by Alison Moyet

from the album Essex
- B-side: "Ode to Boy"
- Released: 4 October 1993
- Genre: Folk pop; dance; rock
- Length: 3:37
- Label: Columbia
- Songwriters: Alison Moyet; Pete Glenister
- Producer: Ian Broudie

Alison Moyet singles chronology
"Hoodoo" (1991)	"Falling" (1993)	"Whispering Your Name" (1994)

Music video
- "Falling" on YouTube

"Falling" is a song by British singer-songwriter Alison Moyet, released in October 1993 by Columbia Records as the lead single from her fourth studio album, Essex (1994). The song was written by Moyet and Pete Glenister, and produced by Ian Broudie of The Lightning Seeds. A music video was filmed to promote the single, directed by The Douglas Brothers.

== Background ==
The Essex album was originally rejected by Columbia, who insisted that it be re-recorded to create a more commercial package. Ian Broudie was hired to produce the re-recorded tracks. "Falling" was released in October 1993, almost half a year before the album's release. However, the song failed to live up to the label's expectations after it did not enter the UK Top 40, peaking at No. 42. In response, "Whispering Your Name", was remixed to become an upbeat dance for release as the following single in early 1994.

== Release ==
"Falling" was released by Columbia on 7-inch vinyl, cassette and CD. It was released in the UK and across Europe, as well as Australia and the United States. The B-side, "Ode to Boy", was taken from Essex and is a re-recording of the Moyet-penned song originally recorded by Yazoo. Most CD editions of the single included a third track; "Falling (Infinite Dub)", a remix produced by The Infinite Wheel. The CD version of the single released in the States included a fourth track; an acoustic version of "It Won't Be Long".

== Critical reception ==
Upon its release as a single, Accrington Observer gave a two out of five star rating and wrote, "Yes, I am afraid you are Ali, which is a shame because you still have a great voice. Unfortunately this is not the song to do it justice." Dave Jennings of Melody Maker was also critical, calling it an "utterly anonymous ambient-dance offering", on which Moyet's "deep, breathless, libidinous growl of a voice is barely audible".

Alan Jones from Music Week gave the song three out of five, saying, "A shadow of her former self, if the sleeve portrait is faithful, Moyet makes a welcome return and, like Right Said Fred, there's hint of the Indian sub-continent about the song. It's a pretty and beautifully-sung vignette that eventually dissolves with some Sixties-style backwards guitar. Interestingly, the 12-inch features an ambient eight-minute dub. A substantial hit."

Pan-European magazine Music & Media commented, "The striking mix of folk pop and dance sounds like a winning combination for radio." In the US, Larry Flick from Billboard magazine stated, "Second pearl from Moyet's Essex collection is a rumbling, acoustic guitar-framed rock ditty. Her distinctive, smoky voice has rarely sounded this endearing, and the tune is among her best compositions to date. Modern rock programmers should take heed."

William Ruhlmann of AllMusic described the song as having a "Revolver-era Beatles sound". Adrian Janes of Penny Black Music noted: "...for the most part [Essex] certainly has, at least instrumentally, the kind of bright energy expected in an Ian Broudie production, whether the jaunty folk feel of "Falling" or the dynamic "Lust for Life" rhythm of "So Am I"." Helena Adams of Reflections of Darkness commented: "Essex starts good through "Falling," a piece that invites to sing along, with commonplace arrangements which nonetheless work to provide an upbeat sensation founded by New Wave."

== Track listings ==
- 7-inch and cassette single
1. "Falling" – 3:37
2. "Ode to Boy" – 2:52
- CD single
1. "Falling" – 3:38
2. "Ode to Boy" – 2:52
3. "Falling (Infinite Dub)" – 8:08
- US CD single
1. "Falling" – 3:37
2. "Ode to Boy" – 2:52
3. "Falling (Infinite Dub)" – 8:07
4. "It Won't Be Long (Acoustic)" – 4:01

== Personnel ==
- Alison Moyet – lead vocals, backing vocals, backing vocal arrangement, tambourine on "Ode to Boy"
- Ian Broudie, Simon Rogers – guitars on "Falling"
- Pete Glenister, Christian Mars – guitars on "Ode to Boy"
- Andy Coughlan – bass on "Ode to Boy"
- Tony Riley – drums on "Ode to Boy"
- David Ballard – bongos on "Ode to Boy"

Production

- Ian Broudie – producer on "Falling"
- Simon Rogers – programming on "Falling"
- Cenzo Townshend – engineer on "Falling"
- David Leonard – mixing on "Falling"
- The Infinite Wheel – remix and additional production on "Falling" (Infinite dub)
- Pete Glenister – producer on "Ode to Boy"
- Neil Brockbank, Vic Van Vugt – engineer on "Ode to Boy"
- Alan Winstanley – mixing on "Ode to Boy"

Other

- The Douglas Brothers – photography
- Alison Moyet, Martin Jenkins – design

== Charts ==
Chart (1993)	Peak position
Australia (ARIA)	201
UK Singles (OCC)	42
UK Airplay (ERA)	58
UK Airplay Breakers (Music Week)	11
