= Getting into Something =

1994 single by Alison Moyet

Single by Alison Moyet

from the album Essex
- B-side: "Never Too Late" (remix); "Dorothy" (acoustic); "Ne me quitte pas" (acoustic)
- Released: 16 May 1994
- Length: 4:15
- Label: Columbia
- Songwriters: Alison Moyet, Pete Glenister
- Producer: Ian Broudie

Alison Moyet singles chronology
"Whispering Your Name" (1994)	"Getting into Something" (1994)	"Ode to Boy" (1994)

"Getting into Something" is a song by British singer-songwriter Alison Moyet, released on 16 May 1994 as the third single from her fourth studio album, Essex. It was written by Moyet and Pete Glenister and produced by Ian Broudie.

== Background ==
Columbia had rejected the original recording of Essex and insisted that it be re-recorded to create a more commercial package. The label hired Ian Broudie to produce various tracks for the re-recorded version; one of which was "Getting into Something". The song was selected as the album's third single. For its release as a single, "Getting into Something" was remixed. The mixing was handled by Dave Bascombe. A "Midnight Mix" of the song was also created by Bay Route.

"Getting into Something" reached number 51 in the UK and remained on the chart for two weeks. It was released on 12-inch, cassette and CD in the UK and on CD across Europe. A promotional video was filmed for the single, which was directed by Liam & Grant (Liam Kan and Grant Hodgson) for the production company HLA. During July 1994, the video was listed in Billboard magazine's The Clip List - a sampling of playlists submitted by national and local music video outlets. The video had received play on the local Boston TV music programme Rage as well as on the Chicago JBTV WWOR network.

== Critical reception ==
Upon its release as a single, Alan Jones of Music Week wrote, "Saddled with an ordinary song, for which, as co-writer, Moyet must share the blame, it is nonetheless always pleasant to hear her voice. Something a little more challenging would have been preferable, however." Pan-European magazine Music & Media were more favourable, describing it as a "ballad with a demanding dance rhythm" and praising Moyet's vocal performance on the track. Holly Barringer of Melody Maker noted the song's "swooping movie soundtrack quality" and remarked, "A trippy beat to start with, subsequently smothered in Alison's chocolate vocal wherein boy meets girl, boy and girl argue, fall in love anyway, run towards each other on a beach (arms wide) and smash emotionally into each other with Alison diva-ishly crescendoing away in the background."

In a review of Essex, Hi-Fi News & Record Review commented, "Tracks like 'Whispering Your Name' and 'Getting into Something' are cleverly arranged, slickly produced, efficiently played and make good showcases for the Moyet lung-power but, they lack memorable tunes." In a retrospective review of the album, Helena Adams of the music website Reflections of Darkness commented on the song's "amazing funky entrance that sets up the ambience with [Moyet's] sensuous voice". Attitude writer Josh Lee described the song as a "forgotten gem".

== Track listings ==
12-inch single

1. "Getting into Something" – 4:15
2. "Getting into Something" (Midnight mix) – 4:31
3. "Never Too Late" (remix) – 3:49

CD single

1. "Getting into Something" – 4:15
2. "Dorothy" (acoustic) – 3:11
3. "Ne me quitte pas" (acoustic) – 3:42
4. "Never Too Late" – 3:50

Cassette single

1. "Getting into Something" – 4:15
2. "Dorothy" (acoustic) – 3:11

== Personnel ==
- Alison Moyet – vocals
- Ian Broudie – guitar, producer, sound mixing
- Simon Fowler – backing vocals
- Steve Cradock – backing vocals
- Dave Bascombe – mixing
- Simon Rogers – programming
- Cenzo Townshend – sound engineer
- Bay Route – remixer on Midnight mix
- Victor Van Vugt – producer on "Dorothy" and "Ne me quitte pas"
- Pete Glenister – producer on "Never Too Late"
- Adrian Bushby, Pete Davis – remixers, additional producers on "Never Too Late"
- Alison Moyet, Martin Jenkins – artwork design
- The Douglas Brothers – photography

== Charts ==
Chart (1994)	Peak position
UK Singles (OCC)	51
UK Airplay Breakers (Music Week)	19
