= Terceto Yoyo =

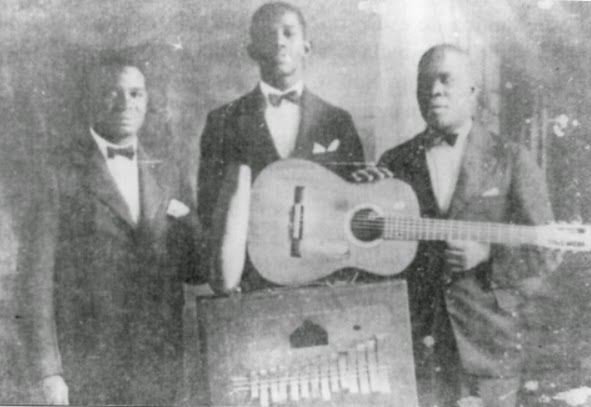

Background information
- Origin: Havana, Cuba
- Genres: Son cubano
- Years active: 1923-1930
- Labels: Victor
- Past members: Heliodoro "Yoyo" Rodríguez; Jesús "Chuchú" Arístola; Celedonio Rodríguez

Terceto Yoyo was a Cuban son trio active during the 1920s. It was formed by Heliodoro "Yoyo" Rodríguez (güiro), Jesús "Chuchú" Arístola (marímbula) and Celedonio Hernández (guitar). They recorded up to twenty songs for Victor in Havana, enjoying great popularity at the time, although only three of their recordings have survived. These are considered the oldest son recordings featuring the marímbula, together with those by the Sexteto Habanero.

Their recording of the "El cangrejito" is the only one issued on CD, as it was included in the Hot Music from Cuba 1907-1936 compilation released by Harlequin Records.

In the early 1960s, Chuchú, Yoyo and Celedonio briefly reunited for a tour promoted by the new Revolutionary Government; Chuchú had to retire from the tour for health reasons.

== Recordings ==
- "La Virgen de Regla" (1925)
- "El cangrejito" (1925)
- "El picadillo" (1930)
