= Slow Children (album) =

Studio album by Slow Children
- Released: 1981
- Genre: New wave
- Label: Ensign
- Producer: Stephen Hague & Jules Shear

Slow Children chronology
Slow Children (1981)	Mad About Town (1982)

Professional ratings
Review scores
Source	Rating
AllMusic	4.5/5 stars

Slow Children is the debut album by American new wave band Slow Children, released in 1981.

There was a release in the UK with an album cover art concept that was adapted from Jean Cocteau's "The Blood of a Poet". There was also a U.S. release with a different cover featuring photos by Robert Mapplethorpe and a different track listing.

The track "Staring at the Ceiling" was released as a single in the UK the same year.

== Track listing, UK ==
1. "Brazilian Magazines"
2. "I Got a Good Mind"
3. "Talk About Horses"
4. "Malicious" (UK only)
5. "She's Like America"
6. "President Am I"
7. "Too Weak to Eat"
8. "Home Life"
9. "Staring at the Ceiling"
10. "Ticket to France" (UK only)
11. "Stuck in Transit"

== Track listing, U.S. ==
1. "President Am I" 3:15
2. "Talk About Horses" 3:02
3. "Too Weak to Eat" 3:00
4. "Brazilian Magazines" 3:03
5. "Stuck in Transit" 3:02
6. "Spring in Fialta" 3:20 (U.S. only)
7. "Staring at the Ceiling" 3:16
8. "Home Life" 2:54
9. "I Got a Good Mind" 3:03
10. "She's Like America" 3:25
