= Prempensua =

Large lamellophone used in the music of Ghana

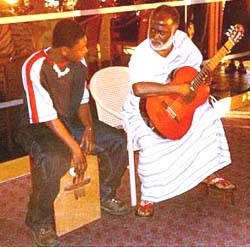

Prempensua and guitar playing at a wedding feast in Ghana
- Developed: Ghana

The prempensua is a large lamellophone used in the music of Ghana, similar to the marímbula or rumba box. The word prempensua is in the Akan language, although similar instruments are played by other ethnolinguistic groups in Ghana. It is also known as the "kono" by the Kassena people, "animgbo" by the Dagomba people, and the "gyilgo" by the Gonja people.

The prempensua musical instrument is being used during social gatherings, occasions of social interest and festivals.

This is the Prempensua musical instrument being used during a musical play

== Listening ==
- Prempensua audio sample
