= If She Knew What She Wants =

1985 promotional single by Jules Shear

Promotional single by Jules Shear

from the album The Eternal Return
- B-side: "Chain Within Chain"
- Released: June 1985
- Genre: New wave; pop rock
- Length: 3:44
- Label: Capitol
- Songwriter: Jules Shear
- Producers: Jules Shear; Bill Drescher

Jules Shear singles chronology
"Steady" (1985)	"If She Knew What She Wants" (1985)	"If We Never Meet Again" (1988)

Audio
- "If She Knew What She Wants" on YouTube

"If She Knew What She Wants" is a song written by American singer-songwriter Jules Shear and introduced on his 1985 album The Eternal Return. The Bangles recorded the song for their 1986 album Different Light. That version, a call-and-response rendition with Susanna Hoffs as the main voice, was issued as a single and became a Top 40 hit. A mid-tempo ballad, it is sung from the viewpoint of someone, per songwriter Shear, "who wants to satisfy someone else but doesn't quite know how to do it because the other person is capricious." The song, especially The Bangles' version, is typically described with such adjectives as "bittersweet", "plaintive" and "wistful".

== Original version ==
"If She Knew What She Wants" was released on February 8, 1985 on Jules Shear's second solo album, The Eternal Return, to critical acclaim. John Piekarski of The Atlanta Constitution lauded the song's "melody [as] dreamy and vivacious yet mellow enough [for] adult contemporary radio [airplay]." An album review by High Fidelity assessed Shear's love songs as "astute [being] equal parts compassion, affectionate wit, and armchair psychoanalysis", exemplified by the lyric "If she knew what she wants I'd be giving it to her" which "condenses a self-help manual for the mates of neurotics into a single piercing line." Shear himself would say that he typically imparted his songs with "some little twist that makes [them] rise above" standard pop music fare, and "It doesn't really have to be too complicated to be a little bit different."

Although passed over as lead single on The Eternal Return in favor of the Cyndi Lauper co-written "Steady" (whose Hot 100 peak was no. 57), "If She Knew What She Wants" was tagged as the potential followup with EMI, who sent promo copies to radio stations in June 1985. When no significant airplay resulted, EMI canceled both the single's commercial release and a tour by Shear to support his album. Shear's original version was co-produced by Shear and Bill Drescher, not to be confused with the baseball player of the same name.

== The Bangles version ==
=== Background ===
"If She Knew What She Wants"
- Picture sleeve of US and Australian vinyl singles

Single by The Bangles

from the album Different Light
- B-side: "Not Like You" (US); "Angels Don't Fall in Love" (UK)
- Released: April 14, 1986
- Recorded: 1985
- Studio: Sunset Sound Factory
- Genre: Pop rock
- Length: 3:49
- Label: Columbia
- Songwriter: Jules Shear
- Producer: David Kahne

The Bangles singles chronology
"Manic Monday" (1986)	"If She Knew What She Wants" (1986)	"Walk Like an Egyptian" (1986)

The Bangles UK / Ireland singles chronology
"Manic Monday" (1986)	"If She Knew What She Wants" (1986)	"Going Down to Liverpool" (1986)

Music video
- "If She Knew What She Wants" on YouTube

The Bangles recorded "If She Knew What She Wants" for their 1986 album Different Light for which it would serve as second single. Hailed by Cashbox as an "infectious, gorgeous pop song...with classic pop dimensions, including a can't-stop-singing-it chorus", "If She Knew What She Wants" would cause Robert Hilburn of the Los Angeles Times to opine that "on...'If She Knew What She Wants' the Bangles' voices blend with the kind of seductive charm that you swore disappeared the day The Mamas & the Papas called it quits," while News Journal (Wilmington Del) writer Peter Bothum would in 2011 recall the Bangles' "If She Knew What She Wants" as "what the Byrds would have sounded like if they were chicks."

The Bangles had spent the autumn of 1984 as the opening act on the Fun Tour by Cyndi Lauper, the singer through whose patronage Jules Shear had first come to the fore, chiefly through Lauper's hit version of Shear's composition "All Through the Night". The Bangles themselves would subsequently assist Shear in the promotion of his The Eternal Return album. When Shear had mimed his single—the Lauper co-written "Steady"—on an American Bandstand episode broadcast on 8 June 1985, The Bangles served as faux-backup band. Shear would also co-write The Bangles' track "I Got Nothing" included on the 1985 The Goonies soundtrack.

Mark Jenkins of The Washington Post would opine that "The Bangles wisely didn't second-guess Shear's version of 'If She Knew What She Wants'; their arrangement of that song... echoes his faithfully—except that they sing better." Vicki Peterson of The Bangles said that the group did slightly change Shears' arrangement. Lyrically, some first-person clauses in Shear's recording (ex. "I'm crazy for this girl") are third-person in The Bangles' version (cf. "He's crazy for this girl"). The positioning of the bridge also differs—in Shear's recording the bridge (which begins with "Some have a style") follows the verse that starts with "No sense thinking I could rehabilitate her"; in The Bangles' version, the bridge comes before that verse.

=== Single release and impact ===
==== Overview ====
Similar in style to the Different Light lead single, "Manic Monday","If She Knew What She Wants" peaked at No. 29 on the Billboard Hot 100, as well as No. 28 on the Cash Box Top 100. Elsewhere, it reached No. 31 on the UK Singles, No. 31 on the Kent Music Report in Australia and No. 29 on the RPM in Canada.

==== Charts ====
Chart performance for "If She Knew What She Wants"
Chart (1986)	Peak position
Australia (Kent Music Report)	31
Austria (Ö3 Austria Top 40)	30
Belgium (Ultratop 50 Flanders)	20
Canada Top Singles (RPM)	29
Ireland (IRMA)	23
Luxembourg (Radio Luxembourg)	18
New Zealand (Recorded Music NZ)	39
Switzerland (Schweizer Hitparade)	20
UK Singles (Official Charts)	31
US Adult Contemporary (Billboard)	24
US Billboard Hot 100	29
US Cash Box	28
West Germany (GfK)	17
Europe (European Hot 100 Singles)	13

=== Video and soundtrack usage ===
The Bangles shot a promotional video for "If She Knew What She Wants" while on tour in the UK the first week of March 1986, and it was this video that aired in the British Isles and Europe. Upon returning the US, the band shot an alternate video for the song's American promotion, produced by Tamar Simon Hoffs, mother of the track's main vocalist Susanna Hoffs, and directed by Dan Perri.

The Bangles version of "If She Knew What She Wants" is featured in the 2006 Tim Allen and Courteney Cox superhero comedy Zoom.
