= The Third Party (album) =

Studio album by Jules Shear
- Released: 1989
- Genre: Folk
- Length: 39:25
- Label: I.R.S.
- Producer: Jules Shear; Marty Willson-Piper

Jules Shear chronology
Demo-itis (1986)	The Third Party (1989)	Unplug This (1991)

The Third Party is the third studio album by American singer-songwriter Jules Shear, released by I.R.S. in 1989.

== Background ==
The Third Party was recorded in December 1988 over a period of two weeks at Montezuma Recording, Stockholm, Sweden. In contrast to the material written by Shear for his band Reckless Sleepers, the material that would be recorded for The Third Party was more folky and acoustic-based. Shear was initially uncertain whether or not to record or shelve the songs he had written in this style, but decided to record them after his longtime friend Marty Willson-Piper offered him the opportunity to record an album in Stockholm. Shear told Greg Kot of The Chicago Tribune: "We recorded underground in an old castle, in two booths with a sliding glass door, so we were right next to each other the whole time. We did it all live basically, recording every day for a few hours and then we'd go eat some herring. It was a calm, fun way to do a record."

Speaking to Barbara Jaeger of The Record, Shear said of the album: "As a commercial consideration, I guess it was pretty suicidal to do a record like this. This is a record where, if you don't like the songs, you won't like the record. But I've never liked records that depend more on production than the songs."

== Critical reception ==
Professional ratings
Review scores
Source	Rating
AllMusic	3.5/5 stars
The Philadelphia Inquirer	3.5/4 stars
Rolling Stone	3/5 stars

On its release, Billboard described the album as showing Shear going a "Dylanesque route". They noted: "Songs are tuneful and often moving, but subdued atmosphere and in-the-raw presentation will make this fine work a tough sell, especially among cautious programmers." Ken Capobianco of The Boston Globe noted the album's focus on "the song and Shear's singing". He felt the material was "first rate songwriting", but added "Shear often whines and bend syllables with a bit too much of a Dylanesque bite".

Tom Moon of The Philadelphia Inquirer considered the "bare guitar-and-voice setting" to be a "mixed blessing": "Because it strips all artifice from the gentle choruses and stinging verses, it's a good thing. But because The Third Party is so spare, it exposes Shear's lack of vocal control and an unnerving tendency to lapse into early-Dylan mannerisms." Anthony DeCurtis, writing for Rolling Stone, felt the material was sometimes "wordy" and Shear's vocals sometimes "wearying", but added he is "capable of coming up with telling melodies and memorable images". DeCurtis concluded that The Third Party "will not disappoint his cult following, even if it is unlikely to expand it."

Steve Korté of Trouser Press noted the album was an "interesting experiment" with "well-crafted songs", but added that "a certain monotony results from Shear's unmelodic singing style and the unvarying guitar arrangements". Stereo Review criticized The Third Party as "an album that recalls nothing so much as a mediocre Bob Dylan bootleg".

In a retrospective review, Chris Woodstra of AllMusic described The Third Party as a "stark, bare-bones acoustic album" which "allow[s] Shear's songs to come to the forefront". He noted the "clever craftsmanship" and "back-to-basics approach" on the album, adding that "his clever wordplay and interesting turns of phrase [are] allowed the proper platform".

== Track listing ==
All tracks are written by Jules Shear.

No.	Title	Length
1.	"I Don't Want It Now"	3:27
2.	"The First Freeze After the Fall"	3:37
3.	"Leave Town"	5:07
4.	"This Primal Fire"	3:12
5.	"Open Your Eyes"	3:52
6.	"Big Kid Face"	3:42
7.	"The Girl's On Fire"	3:29
8.	"And That Was Yesterday"	3:10
9.	"The Once Lost Returns"	2:57
10.	"She Don't Understand You Now"	3:18
11.	"Repetition Repetition Repetition"	3:34

== Personnel ==
Musicians

- Jules Shear – vocals
- Marty Willson-Piper – acoustic guitar

Production

- Jules Shear, Marty Willson-Piper – producers
- Mats Oberg – recording, mixing
- Greg Calbi – mastering

Other

- Donald Krieger, Hugh Brown – art direction
- Hakan Lindell – front cover photography
- Pal Shazar – back cover photography, insert painting
