= The Jolly Boys =

Jamaican mento band

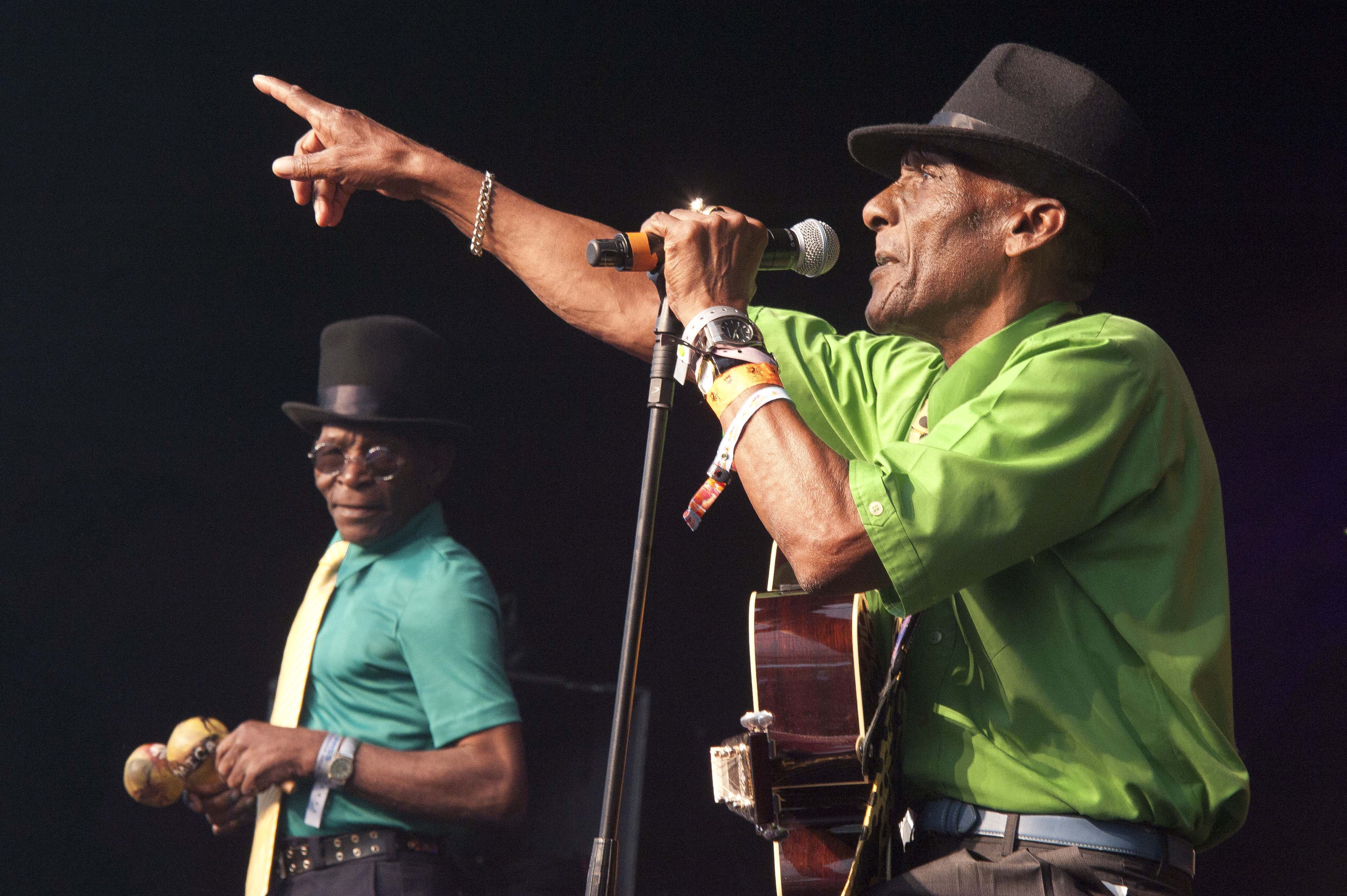
- Cambridge Festivals 2001-2014

Background information
- Origin: Jamaica
- Genres: Mento
- Years active: 1945–2010s
- Members: Derrick "Johnny" Henry (maracas, rumba box and drum), Allan Swymmer (percussion), Albert Minott (lead vocals), Egbert Watson (banjo), Joseph "Powda" Bennett (rumba box) et al.
- Past members: Moses Deans (banjo and guitar), "Papa" Brown (rumba box), Lenford "Brutus" Richards (banjo), Martell Brown and David "Sonny" Martin (guitar).

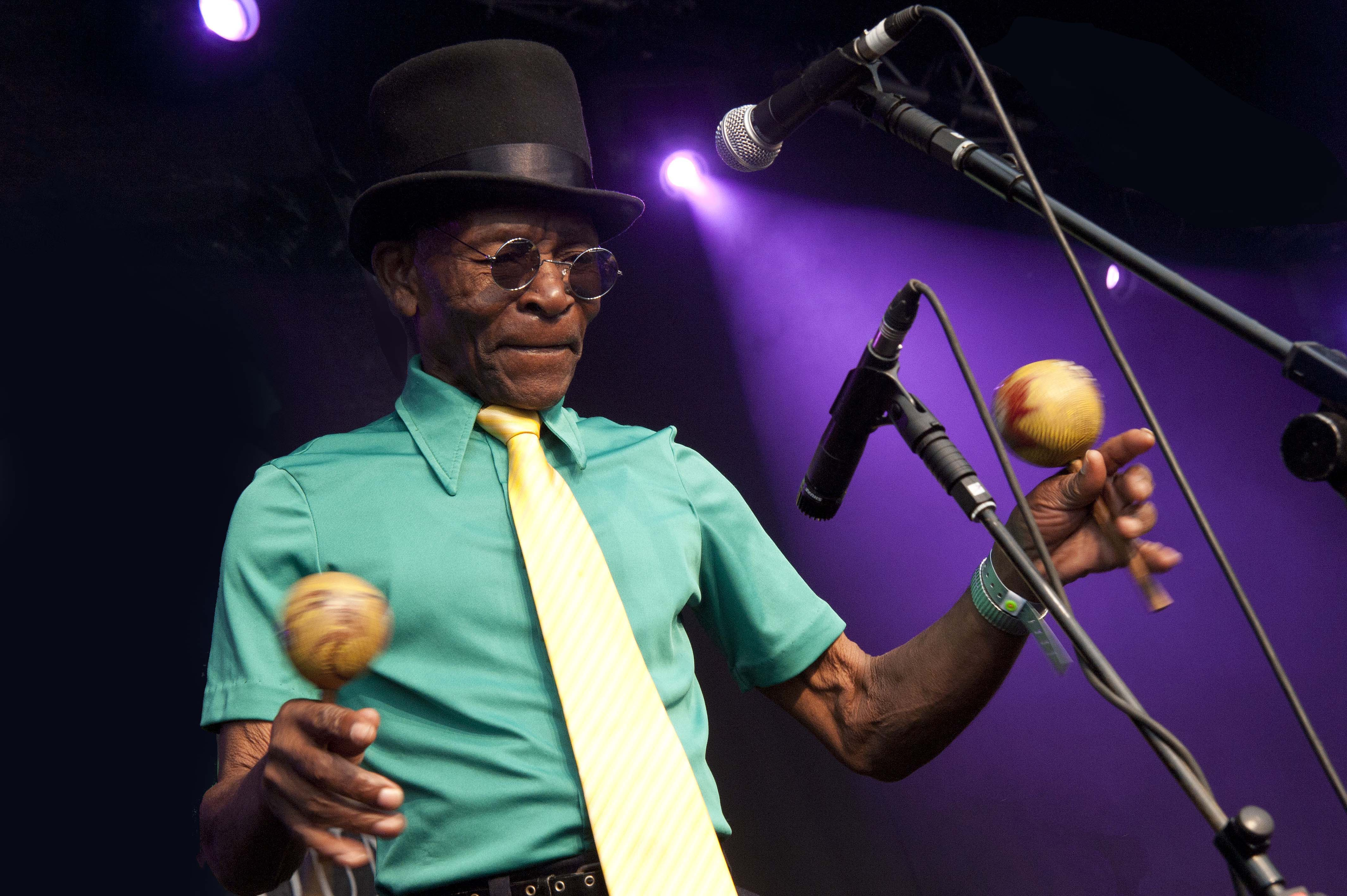

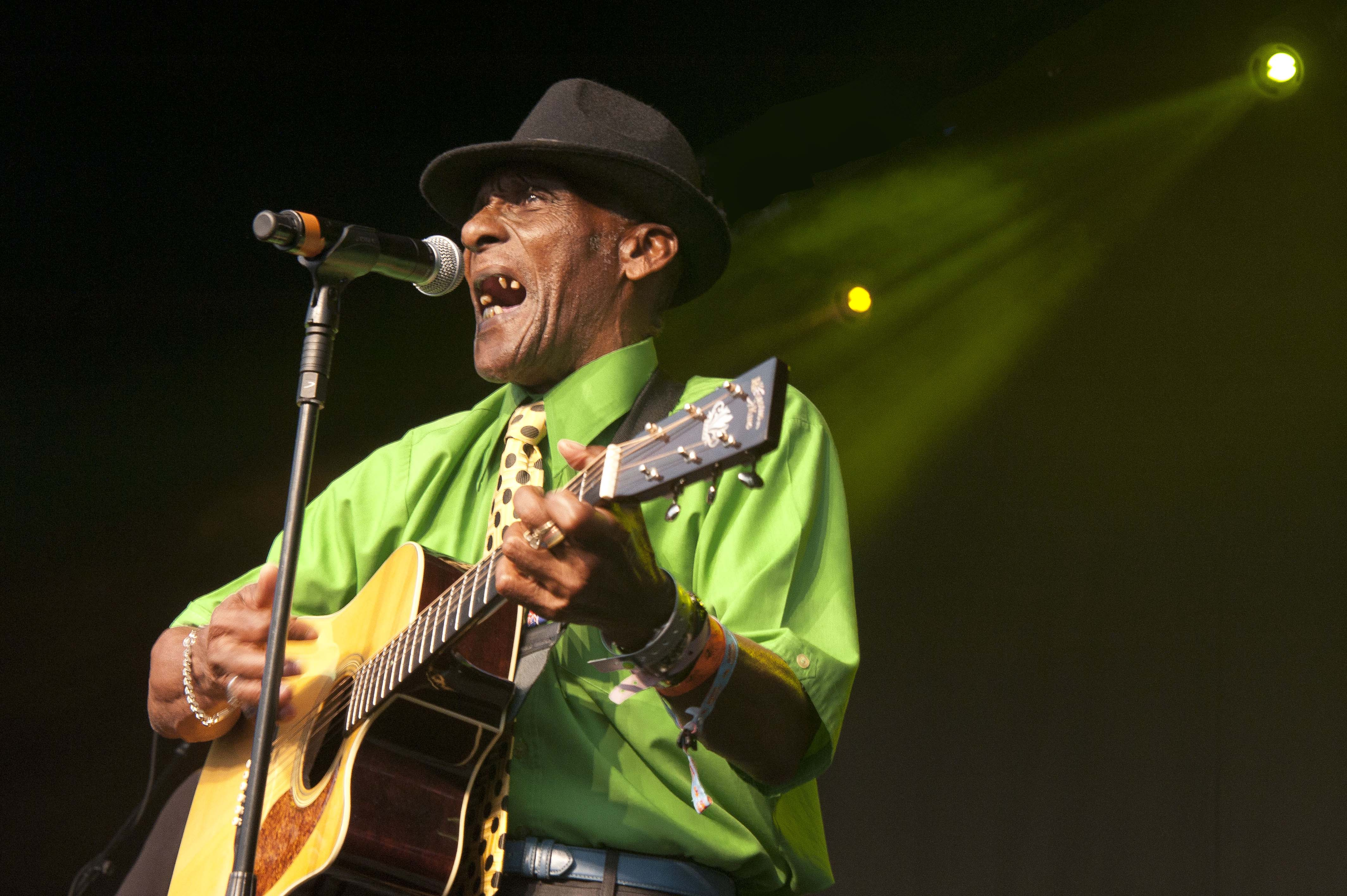

The Jolly Boys are a mento band from Port Antonio, Jamaica. It was formed in 1945 and had great commercial success in the late 1980s and 1990s among reggae and world music fans. They released a new album in 2010 Great Expectation and are currently the house band at GeeJam, a hotel in Port Antonio.

== Early history ==
The Jolly Boys grew out of a group called the Navy Island Swamp Boys that formed on 11 April 1945, and often played at Errol Flynn's parties. This group included Moses Deans on banjo and guitar, Noel Lynch on Guitar and "Papa" Brown on rumba box. After this group split in 1955, Deans and Brown formed The Jolly Boys (a name Errol Flynn is said to have coined) with Derrick "Johnny" Henry on maracas and drum, Martell Brown on guitar, and David "Sonny" Martin on guitar. One of the group's regular substitutes in this period was percussionist Allan Swymmer, who joined the group as a full member in the 1960s. This group was very popular throughout Port Antonio and earned the reputation of being the finest mento band in the parish.

== 1960s ==
In the early 1960s, the Jolly Boys' reputation grew substantially. It performed at hotels and for private parties, often alongside a floorshow/dance troupe. (One of the troupes they typically performed with was led by Albert Minott, at that time an occasional Jolly Boys member and now its current lead singer.) In 1962, the group competed and was a finalist in a national mento band competition held at the Ward Theater in Kingston. The national renown that followed probably also led to international attention. For example, the group auditioned for Jean Farduli, the proprietor of the Blue Angel Supper Club in Chicago (a venue famous for showcasing West Indian music) in 1964. Although it is unclear whether the Jolly Boys passed Farduli's audition, they did travel to New Hampshire in 1966 for what was the first of several six-month engagements.

== 1970s ==
In the 1970s, the Jolly Boys continued to perform in Port Antonio, but also took work elsewhere in Jamaica, most notably at the Round Hill Hotel in Montego Bay. However, in 1969 Allan Swymmer moved to St. Ann's Bay and formed a second, concurrent "Jolly Boys" group composed of musicians local to that area. This group mainly performed in the parish, but they recorded two albums (Roots of Reggae: Music From Jamaica [1977] and Jolly Boys at Club Caribbean [1979]) and several 45s. Although the St. Ann's-based Jolly Boys existed only during the 1970s, its seeming lack of relationship to the group led by Moses Deans created considerable confusion about whether the two groups were related. The two did co-exist, neither, it seems, to the detriment of the other.

== 1980s and 1990s ==
Because several of the Jolly Boys' original members had died by the end of the 1970s, the group foundered for a short period. However, around 1980 Swymmer moved back to Port Antonio and, together with Deans, reformed the Jolly Boys with Joseph "Powda" Bennett on the rumba box.

During the 1983 filming of the film Zombie Island Massacre, The Jolly Boys were filmed performing the song Sarah. They can be seen performing in orange shirts with "The Jolly Boys" written across the front. While they were not credited, both the song and the band appear.

The group found quick work at all the major hotels and was in great demand locally. When singer-songwriter and producer Jules Shear saw the band during a visit to the Trident Hotel in 1989, he decided to produce an album of the group's music. This was the first of four albums the group released between 1989 and 1997. (Many of these albums have been subsequently reissued.) These recordings led to several world tours, an appearance in the film The Mighty Quinn with Denzel Washington, and a level of international recognition few mento groups ever experience.

== 2000s ==
After Moses Deans died in 1998, the group carried on, playing mainly in Port Antonio. In the early 2000s, a rift developed between band members and the group again split into two different "Jolly Boys" bands, one led by Swymmer (which was sometimes called "Allan Swymmer's Mento Band), and the other led by Bennett. It was during this time that the Jolly Boys–both groups, depending on availability–were first hired to play at GeeJam–then a residential recording studio–to entertain the artists working there. (Over the years, this list has included No Doubt, the Gorillaz, Drake and Amy Winehouse.)

The rift between the two bands lasted until 2006 or 2007. When GeeJam opened as a hotel in 2008, the again-reunited Jolly Boys became its house band. The quality of their performances–and particularly the strength and charisma of lead singer Albert Minott–led GeeJam's co-owner Jon Baker to co-produce an album of rock covers done in a "modern" mento style with in-house studio engineer Dale Dizzle Virgo. In November 2009, ethnomusicologist Daniel Neely was brought to play banjo and act as the project's music director. The album, called Great Expectation was released in late 2010, and yielded an international tour representing a new stage in Jolly Boys history.

== Current Lineup ==
Although its core group has remained fairly stable over the past sixty years, a full list of the Jolly Boys members would include a large number of official but transient members. Today, the "original" group consists of Albert Minott (lead vocals), Derrick "Johnny" Henry (rumba box), Allan Swymmer (percussion), and Egbert Watson (banjo). The current touring band mixes three of the original members (Minott, Bennett and Henry) with three younger members (Dale Dizzle Virgo on drums & percussions; and Harold Dawkins "Jah T" on guitar). Long time member Joseph "Powda" Bennett died on 20 August 2014 after a respiratory illness, aged 76. Albert Minott, lead singer of the band from 2009, died on 30 June 2017. He died peacefully sitting on his veranda in Port Antonio. Minott, who was born on 14 September 1938, was 78 years old. He had suffered from respiratory problems for some time. Derrick "Jonny" Henry (Rumba Box) died on March 13, 2019. Henry, who was born on 5 July 1939, was 79 years old. He died quietly at his home in Port Antonio. Banjo player Lenford "Brutus" Richards died suddenly in May 2023.

== Discography ==
- 1972 Take Me Back To Jamaica / Thousands Of Children (Self-released 7" single, credited to "Donald Davidson & The Jally Boys")
- 1972 Build On The Rock / John Tom (Self-released 7" single, credited to "Donald Davidson & The Jally Boys")
- 1977 Roots of Reggae: Music From Jamaica (Lyrichord)
- 1979 Jolly Boys at Club Caribbean (High Note)
- 1989 Pop 'n' Mento (First Warning Records)
- 1991 Sunshine N' Water (First Warning Records)
- 1991 Beer Joint & Tailoring (First Warning Records)
- 1997 Live in Tokyo (Grass Men's Records)
- 2008 Take Me Back To Jamaica (Vox Terrae)
- 2010 Great Expectation (Geejam Recordings)
