= The Jitters =

Canadian rock band

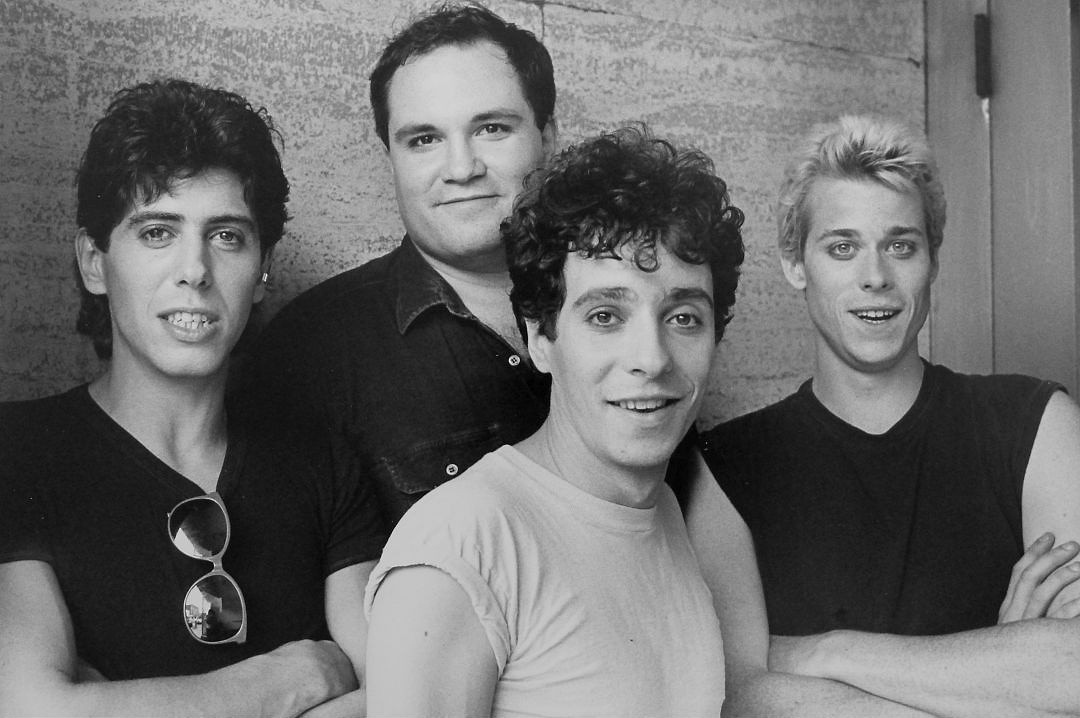
- The Jitters, c. 1984

Background information
- Origin: Toronto, Ontario, Canada
- Genre: Rock
- Years active: 1981 – 1991
- Label: Capitol
- Past members: Blair Packham (lead vocals, guitars); Danny Levy (lead guitar, vocals); Matthew Greenberg (bass, vocals); David Quinton Steinberg (drums); Glenn Martin (drums, vocals); Randy Cooke (drums); Vic D'Arsie (keyboards, vocals); Peter Nunn (keyboards, vocals)

The Jitters were a Canadian rock band formed in Toronto, Ontario, in 1981 by Blair Packham, Danny Levy, and Matthew Greenberg. Five years of constant performing established them as one of the premier club bands in the Greater Toronto Area.

They caught the attention of producer Bob Ezrin in 1982, but studio sessions with him did not produce any results. An independent video in 1984 for the song "Take Me As I Am" brought them limited national exposure, though the song never appeared on any full-length release.

1986 saw The Jitters in an opening slot for Huey Lewis and the News at the Canadian National Exhibition, and tying for third place in Q107's Homegrown Contest with the song "Last of the Red Hot Fools". These two events helped open doors with Capitol Records who proceeded to sign the band. A video for "Last of the Red Hot Fools" was eventually filmed at the R. C. Harris Water Treatment Plant in Toronto. The clip received rotation on MuchMusic and other video programs in Canada.

The Jitters had several songs that were ready for release, and after spending some extra time in the studio with producer Paul Gross, released their eponymous debut in 1987. "Last of the Red Hot Fools" was the first single from the album and became a radio hit throughout the country, and they were nominated at the 1989 Juno Awards in the category of Most Promising Group of the Year.

In 1988, they played support for Heart on their UK tour.

Three years later, The Jitters released their second album Louder Than Words. The result of a collaboration with American songwriter/producer Jules Shear, Louder Than Words was the last effort before the group split in 1991 due to the pressures of constant club tours. Videos for the songs "The Bridge Is Burning" and "'Til The Fever Breaks" also garnered airplay on MuchMusic during this time.

The Jitters reunited in November 2015 for their friend Donna DeLorme's Memorial Concert at The Rivoli in Toronto, again in January 2018 for a show at Hugh's Room in Toronto, followed by a third show in the same venue in September 2019.

== Albums ==
- The Jitters (Capitol, 1987)
- Louder Than Words (Capitol/EMI, 1990)
