= Watch Dog (album) =

Studio album by Jules Shear
- Released: 1983
- Studio: Utopia Sound, Lake Hill, New York
- Length: 46:44
- Label: EMI America
- Producer: Todd Rundgren

Jules Shear chronology
Watch Dog (1983)	The Eternal Return (1985)

Singles from Watch Dog
- 1. "Whispering Your Name" Released: May 1983

Watch Dog is the debut solo album by American singer-songwriter Jules Shear, released by EMI America in 1983 and produced by Todd Rundgren.

== Background ==
Watch Dog was a commercial failure on its release in 1983, as was the single "Whispering Your Name". "All Through the Night" was recorded by American singer Cyndi Lauper for her 1983 debut album She's So Unusual. It was released as the album's fourth single and reached No. 5 on the Billboard Hot 100 in December 1984. In 1994, British singer Alison Moyet released her version of "Whispering Your Name" on her album Essex. As the album's second single, it reached No. 18 on the UK Singles Chart.

== Critical reception ==
Professional ratings
Review scores
Source	Rating
AllMusic	4.5/5 stars
The Philadelphia Inquirer	4/4 stars
Rolling Stone	1/5 stars
The Tampa Tribune	3.5/4 stars

On its release, Billboard felt the album continued the "first class songwriting ability" of Shear since his earlier work with Jules and the Polar Bears. The magazine summarised the album as "intelligent, economical, [and] encompassing a variety of musical systems, but always remaining personal and personable". Cash Box felt the album was Shear's "most focused pop exercise to date", with the songs "bear[ing] the indelible stamp of his own lyrical and musical idiosyncrasies, which he and Rundgren have effectively harnessed without diluting".

Gene Triplett of The Daily Oklahoman noted the "plenty of Beatle-esque elements", while considering Shear's voice to be "a cross between the tragic melancholy of Jackson Browne and the youthful toughness of Todd Rundgren". He added: "Shear's knack for hooks and for lyrics that fit glove-like into each intricate note and chord change is always infectious and intriguing." Steven X. Rea of The Philadelphia Inquirer commented: "Watch Dog is a fine record, an eccentric and eloquent collection of songs that deals with love and romance from a decidedly skewed perspective."

Tom Long of the Santa Cruz Sentinel felt the album contained songs that were "classic Jules tales of confusion and paranoia". However, he criticized the lack of hit potential of any of the tracks, which he feared would result in Shear's loss of a recording contract: "And that's a bonafide drag, because [he] is probably trying to do more with the lyric side of things than just about anybody now writing." David Okamoto of The Tampa Tribune noted that Shear "writes potent pop songs, brimming with lyrical twists strengthened by his straining, coarse vocals".

In a retrospective review, Chris Woodstra of AllMusic noted the "new-found maturity" in Shear's songwriting, which he felt displayed an "eclectic mix of styles from ultra-smooth pop to R&B-inflected rockers". He picked "All Through the Night", "Whispering Your Name" and "Longest Drink" as some of the album's highlights and summarised Watch Dog as an "unjustified commercial sleeper".

== Track listing ==
All tracks are written by Jules Shear.

No.	Title	Length
1.	"Whispering Your Name"	3:43
2.	"Standing Still"	4:25
3.	"All Through the Night"	3:40
4.	"I Need It"	3:50
5.	"The Longest Drink"	6:41
6.	"Never Fall"	4:08
7.	"I Know I Know"	3:41
8.	"She's in Love Again"	3:53
9.	"Love Will Come Again"	4:50
10.	"Marriage Made in Heaven"	7:41

1994 Japanese CD bonus tracks
No.	Title	Length
11.	"When Love Surges" (Extended Version)	7:25
12.	"When Love Surges" (Dub Mix)	4:43

== Personnel ==
Musicians

- Jules Shear
- Elliot Easton
- Rick Marotta
- Stephen Hague
- Todd Rundgren
- Tony Levin
- Roger Powell
- Ann Sheldon

Production

- Todd Rundgren - producer, engineer
- Chris Andersen - engineer
- Michael Young - additional engineer
- Greg Calbi - mastering

Other

- Kenneth McGowan - photography
- Peter Corriston - art direction, design
- Henry Marquez - art direction
