= Dale Dizzle Virgo =

Dale Dizzle Virgo (born May 23, 1985, born Dale Antou Tonye Ian Virgo, also known as Dizzle), is a record producer, musician, engineer and an entrepreneur.

Dale first started producing at age 17 in his home studio in Portmore, Jamaica. He was predominately involved in the Jamaican gospel music fraternity and produced many hit tracks for that industry. In 2005, Virgo signed with Gussie Clarke. In that same year, he did the track Crazy Little Thing Called Love by Rihanna on her début album A Girl Like Me. Dale is also known for producing the Reggae track 'Serious Times' by Gyptian. In November 2008, he began working with Jon Baker at the Geejam Studios as the in-house producer and technical director. Since then, Dale has worked on many albums including 'Thank Me Later' by Drake as assistant engineer for the song 'Over', and 'Great Expectations' by the Jolly Boys as the producer. Dale Virgo, since 2010, is now signed to Forward Recording, and is learning the business from top heads such as Tom Elmhirst, Mark Jones, and Jon Baker.

In addition to producing, Dale Dizzle Virgo was the percussionist for the band Jolly Boys touring Europe, United States, and China.

Over the years, he has produced and engineered many chart topping songs, compilations and albums in both the local and international music industry. To date, he has completed over 60 albums, 2 movies, and has produced countless hit songs such as 'Mama' by Christopher Martin and 'Dreams' by D’Angel.

Virgo's 2021 and 2022 releases through his label Dzl Records include DubSoul Beat Tape Vol. 1, an instrumental project filled with a combination of reggae, soul, trap and some Dub elements, and Good Morning Morning by Gregory David Roberts, which he co-produced.

== Discography ==
- Rihanna - Crazy Little Thing Called Love (Def Jam) (2005)
- Gyptian - Serious Times (2005)
- Compilation - Spiritual War Riddim (2005)
- Gospel Fe Share - APS Production (2004)
- Gospel Compilation - Main Frame Riddim (2005)
- Gospel Compilation - Spirit Scription (2006)
- Compilation - Consuming Fire Riddim (2006)
- 2nd Chance - Walk Gud (2007)
- 2nd Chance - Heavenly Highway (2007)
- Glory to Gloriana Film - Media Mix (2006)
- Minister Blessed - Purpose (2007)
- D'Angel - Dreams (2008)
- Surf Rasta Movie - Geejam Film (2010)
- Jolly Boys - Great Expectations UK Release (Geejam Recordings/Wall Of Sound/PIAS) (2010)
- Jolly Boys - Great Expectations US and Caribbean Edition (2011)
- Drake - Over (Thank Me Later) (2010)
- Divine Brown - Melody of My Heart (Perfect Key Riddim) (2011)
- Nordia Witter - Hour Glass (2010)
- I Eye - Fever Grass (2008)
- Queen Ifrica - Rise Ghetto Youth (2008)
- Christopher Martin - Mama (2012)
- Agent Sasco - Hope River (2018)
- Agent Sasco - Banks of Hope (2018)
- Kim Nain - Deal Wid It ft. Destiny Sparta (2018)
- Ghana - Gypsy Dread EP (2019)
- Senita Mogul - Money Moves (2019)
- Devin DI Dakta - When I'm Gone (2019)
- Saine - Peace of Mind (2020)
- Ce’Cile - Occupied (2020)
- Scantana ft. Rizk - Goodie Goodie Gyal (2021)
- Seanresy - Rocky Road EP (2021)
- SirPlus? - Stutter (2021)
- Kim Nain - Hold On Me (2018)
- Kim Nain - Marijuana (2018)
- Kim Nain - Tempted ft. Devin Di Dakta (2018)
- Kim Nain - Love You My Way ft. Bugle (2018)
- Kim Nain - Walk Away (2018)
- Kim Nain - Driveway (2018)
- Kim Nain - Baby (2018)
- Kim Nain - Needed Your Love ft. Versi (2018)
- Kim Nain - Need Me ft. Naomi Cowan (2018)
- Kim Nain - Roll Up ft. Agent Sasco (2018)
- Scantana - 4WD: 4 Work Days (2022)
- Afro Beat Tape, Vol. 1 (2023)
- Beats by DZL, Vol. 2 (2023)
- Reggae Beat Tape, Vol. 1 (2024)
- The Boss Riddim (2025)
- Sunset Blvd (2025)
- Blaze Mob - Rastafari Children (2024)
- Blaze Mob - Moving Over Barriers (2025)
- Blaze Mob - Be Right There With You (2025)rieved 2022-01-14.
