= The Body Acoustic =

Studio album by Cyndi Lauper
- Released: November 8, 2005
- Studios: Water Music Studio (Hoboken, NJ); LiveWire Studios (New York, NY); Elm Street Studios (Conshohocken, PA); Stratosphere Sound (New York, NY); Magic Shop (New York, NY)
- Genres: Pop rock; acoustic rock
- Length: 52:15
- Labels: Epic; Daylight
- Producers: Cyndi Lauper; William Wittman; Rick Chertoff

Cyndi Lauper chronology
Shine (2004)	The Body Acoustic (2005)	Bring Ya to the Brink (2008)

Singles from The Body Acoustic
- 1. "Time After Time" Released: 2005; 2. "Above the Clouds" Released: 2005

The Body Acoustic is the ninth studio album released by American singer Cyndi Lauper in 2005. It consists of ten previously released songs which have been re-recorded and re-arranged acoustically, as well as two new songs. The album title is a play on Walt Whitman's poem I Sing the Body Electric, with the word body in this case referring to Lauper's body of work as a recording artist. The album features a number of guest artists, including Adam Lazzara, Shaggy, Sarah McLachlan, Jeff Beck, Vivian Green, Ani DiFranco, and Puffy AmiYumi.

A DualDisc edition of the album was released which contained the entire album in enhanced stereo, four new videos directed by Lauper herself as well as a behind-the-scenes featurette on the making of the album. The original pressing of the album became the only album from Cyndi Lauper to be copy-protected using Sony's controversial XCP technology.

== Background and production ==
The album was produced by Rick Chertoff, who worked with the singer on her debut album, She's So Unusual, from 1983, and William Wittman, who produced her At Last album. The twelve songs selected for the record are essentially Lauper's biggest hits, such as "All Through the Night", "Time After Time" and her signature song "Girls Just Wanna Have Fun", all of which are revamped with acoustic jams and sounds of dulcimer played by Lauper herself. Many artists featured in the records, including: Shaggy, Ani DiFranco, Adam Lazzara from Taking Back Sunday, Jeff Beck, Puffy AmiYumi, Sarah McLachlan and Vivian Green. In an interview with Bay Area's reporter, the singer said that she had a "wish list" with the artists she always wanted to work with, many of them said yes to the invitation to work on the album.

In an interview with the Brazilian newspaper Extra, the singer said that the album was a special project, with the intervention of the record company and that she does not consider it as a "career album".

== Critical reception ==
Professional ratings
Review scores
Source	Rating
AllMusic	3.5/5 stars
Robert Christgau	(choice cut)
Rolling Stone	3/5 stars

The album received good reviews from music critics. Thom Jurek from AllMusic website gave the album three and a half stars out of five and wrote that while the idea of guest songs and acoustic versions might seem like a skewed idea, the album comes across as "entirely new, full of adventure, courage, polish and soul". Barry Waters from the Rolling Stone magazine gave the album three stars out of five and noted that " continued progression into quieter material may have left her mainstream rock fans behind years ago, but it has clearly improved her chops." Music critic Robert Christgau gave the album a "Choice Cut" for the song "Money Changes Everything", with that kind of rating he implies that the song "is a good song on an album that's not worth your time or money".

== Track listing ==
No.	Title	Writer(s)	Original album	Length
1.	"Money Changes Everything" (featuring Adam Lazzara)	Tom Gray	She's So Unusual	5:14
2.	"All Through the Night" (featuring Shaggy)	Jules Shear	She's So Unusual	4:40
3.	"Time After Time" (featuring Sarah McLachlan)	Cyndi Lauper; Rob Hyman	She's So Unusual	4:17
4.	"She Bop"	Lauper; Rick Chertoff; Gary Corbett; Stephen Broughton Lunt	She's So Unusual	4:16
5.	"Above the Clouds" (featuring Jeff Beck)	Lauper; Jeff Beck; Jed Leiber	Previously unreleased	3:57
6.	"I'll Be Your River" (featuring Vivian Green)	Lauper; Tom Hammer	Previously unreleased	4:47
7.	"Sisters of Avalon" (featuring Ani DiFranco & Vivian Green)	Lauper; Jan Pulsford	Sisters of Avalon	5:27
8.	"Shine"	Lauper; William Wittman	Shine	3:32
9.	"True Colors"	Tom Kelly; Billy Steinberg	True Colors	4:09
10.	"Water's Edge" (featuring Sarah McLachlan)	Lauper; Hyman	Shine	4:49
11.	"Fearless"	Lauper	Sisters of Avalon	4:07
12.	"Girls Just Want to Have Fun" (featuring Puffy AmiYumi)	Robert Hazard; Lauper	She's So Unusual	2:59

== Personnel ==
- Cyndi Lauper – vocals, appalachian dulcimer, guitar
- Sarah McLachlan – vocals on Time After Time and Water's Edge
- Rick Chertoff – piano, producer
- Allison Cornell – violin, viola, dulcimer drone, background vocals
- Jeff Beck – guitar on "Above the Clouds"
- Jamie West-Oram – guitar
- Kat Dyson – slide guitar, rhythm guitar on "Sisters of Avalon"
- William Wittman – bass guitar, background vocals, producer
- Mark Egan – bass guitar
- Zev Katz – bass
- Steve Gaboury – piano, organ, Roland Juno-60 synthesizer, harmonium
- Jim Hines – trumpet
- Rob Hyman – melodica
- Tom Malone – trombone
- Sammy Merendino – drums

== Charts ==
Chart (2005)	Peak position
Australian Albums (ARIA)	175
Austrian Albums Chart	60
Canadian Album Charts (Nielsen BDS)	62
Colombia Albums Chart	47
French Albums Chart	190
Italian Albums (Musica e dischi)	40
Japanese Albums Chart	42
Scottish Albums Chart	61
Swiss Albums Chart	86
UK Albums Chart	55
US Billboard 200	112
