= Whispering Your Name =

1983 single by Ignatius Jones

- 12-inch single cover, designed by Libby Blainey

Single by Ignatius Jones
- B-side: "Like a Ghost"; "It's No Reason"
- Released: March 1983
- Length: 3:36
- Label: WEA
- Songwriter: Jules Shear
- Producers: Chris Gilbey; Dave Marett; John Morales; Ken Friedman; Sergio Munzibai

Ignatius Jones singles chronology
| "Like a Ghost" (1982) | "Whispering Your Name" (1983) |

Alternative cover
- 7-inch single cover

"Whispering Your Name" is a song written by American singer-songwriter Jules Shear. It was originally performed by Ignatius Jones in 1983, however Shear also recorded the song, which was issued as a single within months of Jones' recording and included on his debut solo album, Watch Dog (1983). It has been covered numerous times, including a charting version by Alison Moyet in 1994.

== Ignatius Jones version ==
"Whispering Your Name" was issued as a single in Australia by Ignatius Jones in March 1983. The single only peaked at No. 100 on the Australian chart, but this and Jones' previous single ("Like a Ghost") were "hot dance club favourites among the gay community on the American west coast."

== Jules Shear version ==
"Whispering Your Name"

Single by Jules Shear

from the album Watch Dog
- B-side: "The Longest Drink"
- Released: May 1983
- Studio: Utopia Sound (Lake Hill, New York)
- Length: 3:47
- Label: EMI America
- Songwriter: Jules Shear
- Producer: Todd Rundgren

Jules Shear singles chronology
| "Whispering Your Name" (1983) | "When Love Surges" (1984) |

Shear's version was produced by Todd Rundgren, and was issued as a single in May 1983 by EMI America and included on Shear's 1983 album Watch Dog. The same album included the original version of "All Through the Night", which was later a hit for Cyndi Lauper. A music video for Shear's version premiered on MTV in 1983 and was filmed at Charterhouse School in Godalming, Surrey, England, in which Shear visits the school as a guest music teacher and a group of British schoolchildren mime to Shear's vocals in the chorus. Shear later recorded an acoustic version of "Whispering Your Name" for his 1991 CD Unplug This.

== Alison Moyet version ==
"Whispering Your Name"

Single by Alison Moyet

from the album Essex
- B-side: "F.O.S."
- Released: February 28, 1994
- Length: 3:49
- Label: Columbia
- Songwriter: Jules Shear
- Producer: Ian Broudie

Alison Moyet singles chronology
| "Falling" (1993) | "Whispering Your Name" (1994) | "Getting into Something" (1994) |

In February 1994, a cover of "Whispering Your Name" was released by English singer Alison Moyet by Columbia Records, as the second single from her fourth studio album, Essex (1994). It was produced by Ian Broudie of The Lightning Seeds.

"Whispering Your Name" became Moyet's eighth (and to date, final) single to enter the top 40 of the UK Singles Chart, peaking at No. 18. It remained in the top 100 for seven weeks.

A promotional video was filmed for the single and featured an appearance from Dawn French. Moyet also performed the song live on the UK music show Top of the Pops.

=== Background ===
In order for the Essex album to be released at all, CBS/Columbia insisted that certain Essex tracks were to be re-recorded and re-produced, and that there be additional material remixed to create a more 'commercial' package. "Whispering Your Name" was originally an acoustic ballad before being turned into an upbeat dance single. This was due to the lead single "Falling" failing to live up to the label's expectations. The original version of "Whispering Your Name" was placed on the Essex album.

A remix of "Whispering Your Name" was created by Vince Clarke who was part of the early 1980s duo Yazoo with Moyet. This was the closest thing to a Yazoo reunion until their Reconnected tour in 2008.

=== Critical reception ===
Upon release, Larry Flick from Billboard magazine stated, "Images of Yaz will twirl in your head upon impact of this percolating pop/NRG ditty from the eternally underrated belter's new Essex collection. Her voice is in excellent shape and put to good use with a song that is instantly memorable. Producer Ian Broudie fleshes the track out with a synth-savvy arrangement that skirts the lines dividing modern pop radio and nightclubs." Linda Ryan from the Gavin Report noted that there are two very distinct versions of the track, "a high energy dance version and a soft, acoustic ballad." She added, "Personally, I think a lush, gorgeous ballad is the perfect setting for Alison's husky, emotive voice, but I know there are plenty of dance-leaning stations on the panel that will have mondo-success with the Pet Shop Boys-ish, wave your hands in the air, version." The magazine's Dave Sholin concluded, "Unlike anything else out there right now, this track will put her over the top in the U.S."

British newspaper Lennox Herald wrote, "Great voice who is deserving of chart success but seems to be a touch unlucky recently in her choice of material. This track, however, might just do the business." In his weekly UK chart commentary, James Masterton said that it "is a rather brilliant Las Vegas-style ballad complete with a video starring Dawn French." A reviewer from Music & Media commented, "Like the Bangles before her, Moyet dips into the back catalogue of Jules Shear for a tailor-made pop song with a back to Yazoo-roots synth flavour." Alan Jones from Music Week named it Pick of the Week, writing, "A sumptuous-sounding single, rather in the K D Lang mould, already getting plenty of media support, not least because it is accompanied by an amusing video featuring Dawn French. Not vintage Moyet, perhaps, but good enough to be a medium-sized hit."

=== Music video ===
The accompanying music video for the song shows Moyet performing the song in a plain studio setting, when Dawn French suddenly appears dressed like a 1960s hippie and starts jumping around and acting up in front of the camera. She starts kissing and licking the camera lens, even causing Moyet to break character and start laughing. French continues to upstage Moyet, even locking her in a lengthy kiss, with Moyet then continuing to perform the song with lipstick smeared all over her face. French then accidentally knocks Moyet unconscious, so she starts to lip-sync to the song herself. Moyet starts to regain consciousness but is knocked out again when French drops the microphone on her head. After miming to the remainder of the song, French faints and Moyet gets up and drags her away. The video was published on YouTube in March 2011, and as of May 2025, it has received more than 714,000 views.

=== Track listings ===
- 12-inch single
1. "Whispering Your Name (Extended Mix)" - 4:57
2. "Whispering Your Name (Vince Clarke Remix)" - 3:42
3. "Hoodoo (Remix)" - 7:41
4. "Back Where I Belong (Soft Mix)" - 5:32
- CD single (UK)
1. "Whispering Your Name (Single Mix)" - 3:51
2. "Rise (Live)" - 3:08
3. "Wishing You Were Here (Live)" - 3:50
4. "Rock and Roll (Live)" - 2:14
- CD single (CD 2)
1. "Whispering Your Name (Extended Mix)" - 4:57
2. "Whispering Your Name (Vince Clarke Remix)" - 3:42
3. "Hoodoo (Remix)" - 7:41
4. "Back Where I Belong (Soft Mix)" - 5:32
- CD single (Europe)
1. "Whispering Your Name (Single Mix)" - 3:49
2. "F.O.S." - 4:16
- CD single (Europe)
1. "Whispering Your Name (Single Mix)" - 3:49
2. "Whispering Your Name (Album Version)" - 3:28
3. "Whispering Your Name (Vince Clarke Remix)" - 3:42
4. "Hoodoo (Remix)" - 7:41
5. "Wishing You Were Here (Live)" - 3:49
6. "Rise (Live)" - 3:06
- CD single (America)
1. "Whispering Your Name (Single Mix)" - 3:47
2. "Whispering Your Name (Extended Mix)" - 4:57
3. "Another Living Day" - 3:44
4. "Rock and Roll (Live)" - 2:12
5. "F.O.S." - 4:16

=== Personnel ===
- Producer of "Whispering Your Name" – Ian Broudie
- Additional producer, remixer of "Whispering Your Name (Extended Remix) – Johnny Nitrate, Steve Rocket
- Mixer on "Whispering Your Name (Single Mix)" - Graham Dickson
- Remixer of "Whispering Your Name (Remix)" - Vince Clarke
- Remixer of "Hoodoo (Remix)" - François Kevorkian
- Producer of "Hoodoo (Remix)" and "Another Living Day" - Pete Glenister
- Remixer of "Back Where I Belong (Soft Mix)" - Ben Chapman
- Producer of "Back Where I Belong (Soft Mix)" - Andy Cox, David Steele
- Producer of "F.O.S." - Adrian Bushby, Pete Davis
- Artwork design – Alison Moyet, Martin Jenkins
- Photography – The Douglas Brothers

=== Charts ===
==== Weekly charts ====
| Chart (1994) | Peak position |
|---|---|
| Australia (ARIA) | 166 |
| Belgium (Ultratop) | 31 |
| Europe (Eurochart Hot 100) | 51 |
| Europe (European Hit Radio) | 36 |
| Germany (Official German Charts) | 75 |
| Iceland (Íslenski Listinn Topp 40) | 33 |
| Israel (Israeli Singles Chart) | 7 |
| Netherlands (Dutch Single Tip) | 6 |
| Scotland (OCC) | 21 |
| UK Singles (OCC) | 18 |
| UK Airplay (Music Week) | 15 |

==== Year-end charts ====
| Chart (1994) | Position |
|---|---|
| UK Singles (OCC) | 149 |
