= Essex (album) =

Studio album by Alison Moyet
- Released: 21 March 1994
- Genres: Alternative pop; synth-pop
- Length: 48:20
- Label: Columbia
- Producers: Ian Broudie; Pete Glenister

Alison Moyet chronology
Hoodoo (1991)	Essex (1994)	Singles (1995)

Singles from Essex
- 1. "Falling" Released: 4 October 1993; 2. "Whispering Your Name" Released: 28 February 1994; 3. "Getting into Something" Released: 16 May 1994; 4. "Ode to Boy" Released: 10 October 1994

Essex is the fourth solo studio album by English singer Alison Moyet, released on 21 March 1994 by Columbia Records. The album, named after the artist's native Essex, England, reached No. 24 on the UK Albums Chart and includes the singles "Falling", "Whispering Your Name", "Getting into Something" and "Ode to Boy".

A deluxe edition of Essex was released by BMG on 25 November 2016.

== Background ==
Having demanded greater artistic freedom from her record company, Moyet was left to record her third album Hoodoo without input from the label. Upon the album's release in 1991, sales were not as strong as her previous efforts. When Moyet began work on her next album project, she was again given freedom by the label. She continued to write and record with Pete Glenister, who Moyet had previously worked with for Hoodoo. Recalling her return to the studio, Moyet commented in 2007 that she and Glenister wanted to record an album that was "rawer, more crunchy" and with "weird" backing vocals. The aim was to record songs that "could be stripped bare to guitar and still be recognisable".

However, when her new album was completed, Columbia rejected the finished product and insisted that it be re-recorded to create a more commercial package. Unsatisfied with the album's sound, Columbia then hired Ian Broudie to produce various tracks for the re-recorded version. Moyet later recalled: "I had lost a little of the energy in having to do it twice but Ian is a clever bloke and it was another interesting experience." The new recording sessions took place in Liverpool.

While re-recording the album, Columbia saw various management changes, resulting in different expectations of what Moyet should be recording. She commented to Billboard in February 1994: "You're a week away from delivering it [the album], and the MD suddenly wants you to do a jazz cover. It was a bit of a dogfight." Once the re-recorded album was completed and ready for release, Columbia accepted the new version and soon gained hope that the album would allow Moyet to regain the commercial success she had lost with Hoodoo. Speaking of the American market, Jay Krugman, the vice-president of marketing for Columbia East Coast, commented to Billboard magazine that the label was hoping the album would do well "through the college and alternative marketplace". He added: "We've been setting the album up for some time, using the strong base that Alison has."

Essex was released in March 1994 and failed to live up to expectations commercially. The album peaked at No. 24 in the United Kingdom and No. 194 in the United States. The album's lead single, "Falling", which was released in October 1993, reached No. 42 in the UK, failing to meet Columbia's expectations. As a result, the second single, "Whispering Your Name", was remixed into an upbeat dance single and returned Moyet to the UK top 40. It peaked at No. 18 following its release in February 1994. "Getting into Something", the album's third single, was also remixed for release as a single in May 1994. It reached No. 51 in the UK. The final single was "Ode to Boy", released in October 1994 and peaking at No. 59 in the UK.

Essex would turn out to be Moyet's last studio album for eight years, despite her 1995 compilation Singles topping the UK chart. Following the release of Essex, Moyet felt she had no support left at the label. Although she recorded her next album Hometime for Columbia/Sony, the company had no interest in releasing it. It was then released by Sanctuary Records in 2002.

== Critical reception ==
Professional ratings
Review scores
Source	Rating
AllMusic	3/5 stars
Entertainment Weekly	C+
Hi-Fi News & Record Review	Favourable
Louder Than War	8/10
Music & Media	Favourable
Musician	Favourable
NME	3/10

Upon its release, Hi-Fi News & Record Review commented: "There are things here which, given the right nudges, will shift a lot of units for Moyet. Tracks like 'Whispering Your Name' and 'Getting into Something' are cleverly arranged, slickly produced, efficiently played and make good showcases for the Moyet lung-power but, with a couple of exceptions ('Satellite', 'Dorothy') they lack memorable tunes." NME felt Moyet "goes all powerpop" and "scuttles along all sorts of innocuous guitar-pop trajectories" on the album. James Bernard of the American Entertainment Weekly summarised: "This British belter slows it down on her fourth solo release Essex with plenty of guitar strumming, soothing harmonies, and bare-handed percussion. While she displays impressive range - it's not particularly distinctive. Essex may be elegant, but it lacks emotional weight." Musician stated: "Essex with its emphasis on guitar over synths, it's tempting to take this as a rejection of Moyet's electro-soul past. But what these arrangements really do is place her husky, expressive voice in a setting that supports its warmth and vulnerability."

William Ruhlmann of AllMusic wrote: "...by this point she is struggling to sound distinctive against the overeager production style of Ian Broudie, whose work is somewhat offset by the more sedate tracks produced by Pete Glenister. 'Whispering Your Name,' with a lyric intended to be sung by one man to another, sounds curious coming out of Moyet's mouth, but at least the words are about something definite, which is more than you can say for Moyet's own elliptical expressions of anger and romantic discord. The best song, the ballad 'Satellite,' is buried in the middle of the record - what makes it the best is that the arrangement actually allows Moyet the space to sing and to be as moving as she can be."

Speaking of the 2016 deluxe edition, Attitude writer Josh Lee stated: "It's [Hoodoo] a great album but it alienated many fans and displeased the record company, who put their foot down with follow-up Essex and insisted Moyet go back into the studio for a do-over. That's why it often sounds like her heart isn't in it, although 'Getting into Something' is a forgotten gem and the original laidback version of 'Whispering Your Name' is just lovely." Gay Times writer Darren Howard wrote: "There's a bit of a Brit Pop vibe to this album. If Hoodoo was an anger album, then Essex sounds much more carefree, there are still stories of hard times in the lyrics but set to a happier beat. Again, this deluxe edition only adds to an already impressive album."

== Track listing ==
No.	Title	Writer(s)	Length
1.	"Falling"	Alison Moyet, Pete Glenister	3:40
2.	"And I Know"	Moyet, Glenister	3:49
3.	"Whispering Your Name"	Jules Shear	3:28
4.	"Getting into Something"	Moyet, Glenister	4:16
5.	"So Am I"	Moyet, Ian Broudie	3:45
6.	"Satellite"	Moyet, Glenister	4:16
7.	"Ode to Boy"	Moyet	2:53
8.	"Dorothy"	Moyet, Glenister	3:26
9.	"Another Living Day"	Moyet, Glenister	3:45
10.	"Boys Own"	Moyet, Glenister	4:05
11.	"Take of Me"	Moyet, Glenister	4:01

Original release additional tracks
No.	Title	Length
12.	"Ode to Boy II"	2:57
13.	"Whispering Your Name (Single Mix)"	3:49

2016 remastered deluxe edition (disc one bonus tracks)
No.	Title	Writer(s)	Length
12.	"Ode to Boy II"		2:57
13.	"Whispering Your Name (Single Mix)"		3:49
14.	"The First Time Ever I Saw Your Face (Single Mix)"	Ewan MacColl	3:20
15.	"Blue (Original Version)"	Moyet, Glenister	3:22
16.	"Solid Wood (Single Mix)"	Moyet	4:21
17.	"Our Colander Eyes (Single Mix)"	Moyet, Glenister	4:20
18.	"My Best Day (The Lightning Seeds featuring Alison Moyet)"	Moyet, Broudie	5:01
19.	"Make a Change (Nearly God featuring Alison Moyet)"	Moyet, Tricky	6:00

2016 remastered deluxe edition (disc two)
No.	Title	Writer(s)	Length
1.	"Falling (Infinite Dub)"		8:08
2.	"It Won't Be Long (Acoustic)"		4:03
3.	"Whispering Your Name (Extended Remix)"		4:58
4.	"Whispering Your Name (Remix)"		3:42
5.	"Getting into Something (Midnight Mix)"		4:19
6.	"Dorothy (Acoustic)"		3:13
7.	"Ne Me Quitte Pas (Acoustic)"	Jacques Brel	3:45
8.	"Never Too Late (Remix)"	Moyet, Warren Kennedy, Dean Kennedy	3:50
9.	"Never Too Late (Extended Remix)"		10:59
10.	"Life in a Hole"	Moyet, Glenister	3:48
11.	"Rock and Roll (Live at the Mean Fiddler, 1992)"	Jimmy Page, John Bonham, John Paul Jones, Robert Plant	2:13
12.	"Sunderland Glynn"	Moyet, Glenister	2:53
13.	"Beautiful"	Moyet, Glenister	4:51
14.	"How Long (Alternate Version)"	Moyet, Glenister	3:49
15.	"Blue (The Essential Mix)"		3:20
16.	"Our Colander Eyes (Demo)"		3:47
17.	"Blue (Playing the Field Edit)"		1:08
18.	"There Are Worse Things I Could Do"	Jim Jacobs, Warren Casey	2:27

== Personnel ==
=== Musicians ===
- Alison Moyet – vocals, backing vocals (tracks: 1–2, 4–11), tambourine (track: 7)
- Ian Broudie – guitars (tracks: 1–5, 8, 10)
- Pete Glenister – guitars (tracks: 6, 7, 9, 11)
- Simon Rogers – guitars (tracks: 1 & 2), programming (tracks: 1–5, 8, 10), mandolin (track: 8)
- Steve Cradock – guitars (track: 6), backing vocals (tracks: 4 & 9)
- Christian Marsac – guitars (track: 7)
- Simon Fowler – backing vocals (tracks: 4 & 9)
- Alan Dunn – accordion (track: 8)
- Chris Haigh – fiddle (track: 8)
- John McKenzie – bass (tracks: 6, 9)
- Alan Taylor – double bass (track: 6)
- Electra Strings – strings (track: 6)
- Dave Ruffy – drums (tracks: 6 & 9)
- Pandit Dinesh – percussion (track: 9)
- Phil Overhead – percussion (track: 6)
- David Ballard – bongos (track: 7)

=== Technical ===
- Ian Broudie – producer (tracks: 1–5, 8, 10, 13), sound mixing (tracks: 2–5, 8–10)
- Pete Glenister – producer (tracks: 6, 7, 9, 11, 12)
- Pete Davis – additional production and remix (track: 12)
- Adrian Bushby – additional production and remix (track: 12)
- Steve Rocket – additional production and remix (track: 13)
- Johnny Nitrate – additional production and remix (track: 13)
- Alison Moyet – arranger backing vocals
- Cenzo Townshend – sound engineer (tracks: 1–5, 8–10)
- Neil Brockbank – sound engineer (tracks: 6, 7, 9, 11)
- Victor van Vugt – sound engineer (tracks: 7 & 9)
- David Leonard – sound mixing (track: 1)
- Alan Winstanley – sound mixing (tracks: 6 & 7)
- Phil Legg – sound mixing (tracks: 11)
- Graham Dickson – sound mixing (track: 13)

== Charts ==
Chart performance for Essex
Chart (1994)	Peak position
Dutch Albums (Album Top 100)	91
German Albums (Offizielle Top 100)	74
Scottish Albums (Official Charts)	40
Swiss Albums (Schweizer Hitparade)	50
UK Albums (Official Charts)	24
US Billboard 200	194
