= Marímbula =

Lamellophone from the Caribbean

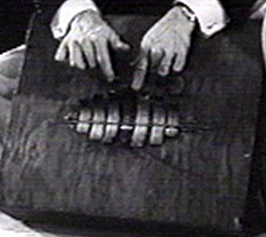
- Marimbula

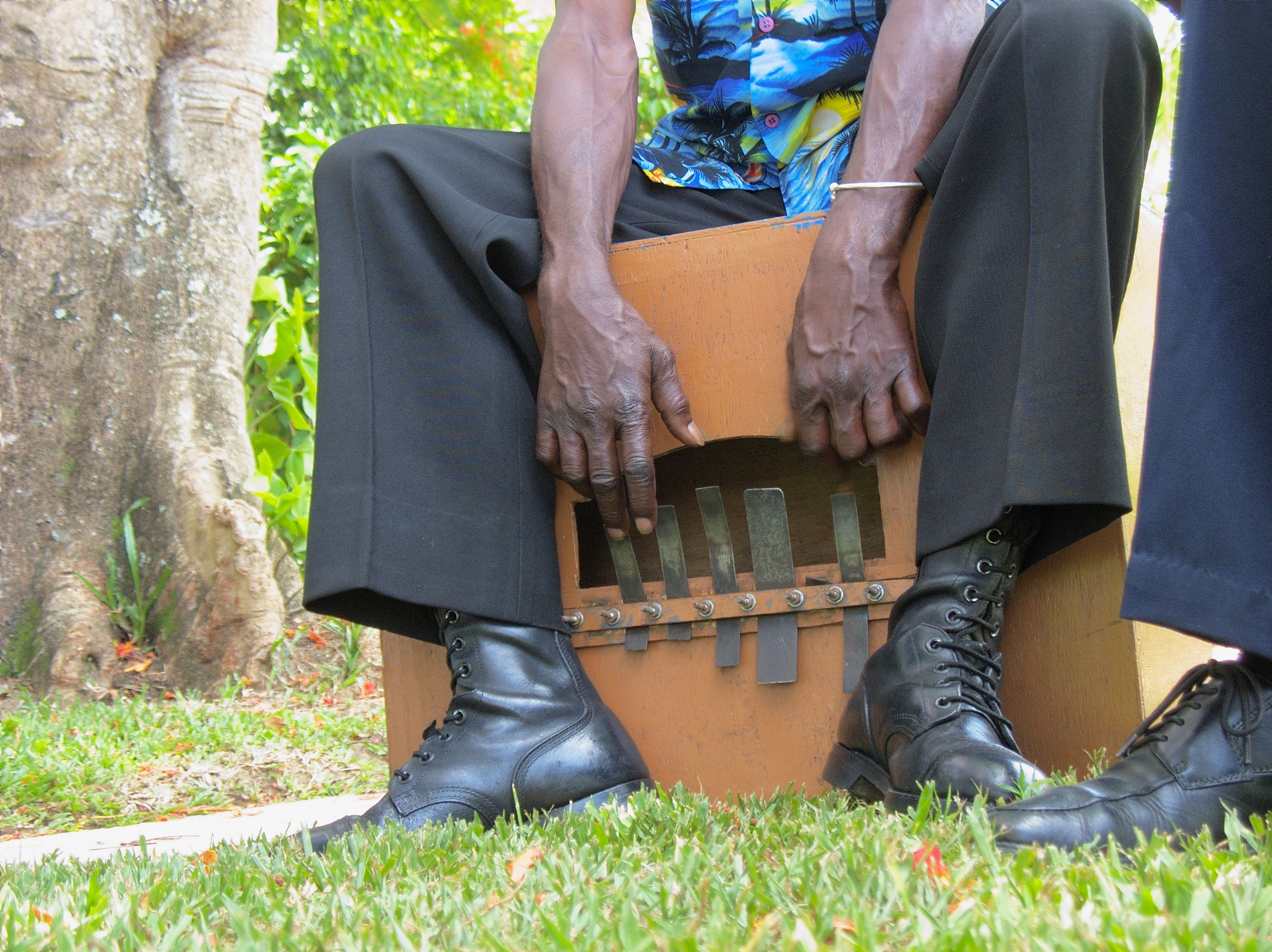
Marimbula player

The marímbula (Spanish pronunciation: [maˈɾimbula]) is a plucked box musical instrument of the Caribbean. In Cuba it is common in the changüí genre, as well as old styles of son. In Mexico, where it is known as marimbol is played in son jarocho; in the Dominican Republic, where it is known as marimba, it is played in merengue típico, and in Jamaica it is known as rumba box and played in mento.

The marímbula is usually classified as part of the lamellophone family of musical instruments. Unlike typical African lamellophones, such as the mbira, used to produce complex polyphony and polyrhythms, the marimbula usually plays the role of a bass guitar, i.e. providing the rhythmic and harmonic support for a band, although it can produce a simple melody as well.

Designs of marimbulas vary greatly, in terms of the material of resonator, the number and arrangement of keys, the overall arrangement and size of the instrument and the way it is played.

== Characteristics ==
It consists of a wooden box with a sound hole cut in the center of it. Across this hole, a number of metal strips are attached at one end to the resonating box. These metal strips are tuned to different pitches, and are plucked to produce a bassline for the music.

== History ==
With its roots in African instruments, the marimbula originated in the province of Oriente, Cuba, in the 19th century. Eventually it spread throughout the Caribbean, the Americas, and Africa, from Liberia to the Congo. By the 1930s it had made its way to Haiti, the Dominican Republic, Puerto Rico, Jamaica, other Caribbean islands, Mexico, and as far away as New York City. The Cubans call it marímbula, and most of the other Caribbean countries have adopted this name or some variant of it: marimba, malimba, manimba, marimbol. The instrument has a number of other names, such as marímbola (Puerto Rico), bass box, calimba (calymba), rhumba box, Church & Clap, Jazz Jim or Lazy Bass (Jamaica), and box lamellophone.

Sound of a marímbula being played

African slaves of the Caribbean made musical instruments from whatever stray material they could lay their hands on. Early marimbulas were made from discarded wooden packing crates, with tongues (keys) made of springy wood, bamboo, old hack-saw blades, all kinds of discarded springs, etc. The musician sits on top of the box reaching down to pluck the tongues whilst slapping the sides of the box like a drum. The instrument's evolution and playing style is similar to the cajon box drum.

This instrument was very important in the development of Afro-Cuban music as it was one of the basic instruments played by changüí musicians. Both changüí and son genres developed as a result of the combination of African and Spanish musical styles and instrumentation. Thus, changüí musicians still play a pair of tack-head bongos, marímbula, a pair of maracas, güiro, and tres to accompany the voice of the vocalist and chorus. Most of the above-mentioned instruments are handmade folk instruments, made from locally available materials, as opposed to commercially produced instruments. The oldest surviving recordings of the marímbula in Cuba were made by Terceto Yoyo and Sexteto Habanero in 1925.

This was one of the many instruments imported from the Americas to Africa, which continue to be played to this day, in various forms and styles, particularly in the countries of Sierra Leone, Liberia, Guinea, Ghana and Nigeria.

The marímbula became quite popular in Jamaica in conjunction with guitars, drums, maracas, and vocals in the churches, where it was known as church and clap, in nightclubs where it was known as jazz jim, and among the various hotel performers, who played mento music. It can still be found in use by mento musicians such as The Jolly Boys.

Currently, the instrument is regaining popularity among hip hop artists and mbira players, like Chartwell Dutiro and The Jolly Boys.

== See also ==
- Prempensua, a similar instrument used in the music of Ghana
- Oopoochawa
