= Change No Change =

Studio album by Elliot Easton
- Released: 1985
- Studio: Syncro Sound (Boston)
- Genre: Avant-pop
- Label: Elektra
- Producer: Stephen Hague, Jon Mathias

Change No Change is the first and only solo album released by Elliot Easton of The Cars. It was originally released in 1985 by Elektra Records, re-released in 1996 by Elektra Traditions/Rhino Records, and again released by Wounded Bird in 2006.

The original album consists of ten songs written by Easton and Jules Shear, who also contributed background vocals. Easton plays all guitars, including 12-string guitar, sitar and bass (with the exception of Side B, where Brad Hallen plays bass on four of the tracks). The album's producers were Stephen Hague, who had played with Shear in Jules and the Polar Bears, and synth player Jon Mathias. Roy Thomas Baker, who had produced the first four Cars albums, is given thanks in the credits for his encouragement of Easton's solo project, but did not act as a producer.

In the liner notes to the Rhino release, both Easton and Shear cite "Wide Awake" as their favorite track from the album, with Shear saying "It has a little fairy dust quality about it with all the singing."

The 1996 and 2006 releases feature five tracks from the unreleased debut album by Band of Angels (not to be confused with the mid-1960s English pop group A Band of Angels), a project Easton formed with singer Danny Malone. Easton does not sing lead on these tracks. "Walk on Walden" is an instrumental on 12-string guitar in drop D tuning.

== Track listing ==
All songs written by Elliot Easton and Jules Shear.

1. "Tools of Your Labor"
2. "(Wearing Down) Like a Wheel"
3. "Shayla"
4. "Help Me"
5. "(She Made it) New for Me"
6. "I Want You"
7. "The Hard Way"
8. "Fight My Way to Love"
9. "Change"
10. "Wide Awake"

=== Bonus tracks from Band of Angels ===
1. "Lonely is the Dark" (Easton, Danny Malone)
2. "Walk on Walden" (Easton)
3. "Long, Long Time" (Easton, Malone)
4. "Stop the World from Turning" (Easton, Malone)
5. "Let It Slide" (Easton, Malone, Stan Lynch)

Produced by Roy Thomas Baker
Engineered by Eddie Delano

== Personnel ==
- Elliot Easton - vocals, guitars, electric sitar, bass
- Stephen George - drums
- Brad Hallen - bass on tracks 7,8,10
- Stephen Hague - synthesizer
- Jon Mathias - additional synthesizer on "Wide Awake", additional backing vocals on "Tools of Your Labor" and "I Want You"
- Jules Shear - background vocals
- Danny Malone - vocals on bonus tracks
- Stan Lynch - drums on bonus tracks
- Benmont Tench - keyboards on bonus tracks
