= Healing Bones =

Studio album by Jules Shear
- Released: 1994
- Genre: Pop
- Label: Island
- Producer: Peter Van Hooke, Rod Argent

Jules Shear chronology
Horse of a Different Color: The Jules Shear Collection (1976–1989) (1993)	Healing Bones (1994)	Between Us (1998)

Healing Bones is an album by the American musician Jules Shear, released in 1994. The first single was "Listen to What She Says". Shear supported the album with a North American tour that included Paula Cole as the opening act.

== Production ==
The album was recorded in a barn in Bearsville, New York. It was coproduced by Peter Van Hooke and Rod Argent; Argent also played keyboards. "The Sun Ain't Gonna Shine Anymore" is a cover of the Walker Brothers song. The title track, cowritten by Rick Danko, describes the death of a woman due to a plowing mishap. "Two Friends" is about a person living with schizophrenia.

== Critical reception ==
Professional ratings
Review scores
Source	Rating
AllMusic	3.5/5 stars
Calgary Herald	B−
MusicHound Rock: The Essential Album Guide	3/5 stars
Pittsburgh Post-Gazette	4/4 stars
Rolling Stone	4/5 stars

Guitar Player called Shear "one of few writers to compete with Elvis Costello's verbal virtuosity and unerring ear for hooks." The News Tribune deemed the album "vibrant, electrified pop performed by an amazing band." The Pittsburgh Post-Gazette determined that, "with a voice that at different times has an uncanny resemblance to Jackson Browne and Tom Petty, Shear brings feeling to his often-poignant lyrics."

The St. Louis Post-Dispatch labeled Healing Bones a "generic collection of tepid retreads." Rolling Stone wrote that "A Prayer (For Those Not Here)" "combines a Motown-catchy beat, Beach Boys-style backups and audacious rhymes (theoretically and phonetically) in pop that's as literate as it is melodic." The Calgary Herald praised Shear's "weirdly engaging nasal voice."

AllMusic wrote that "Shear and his crack four-piece band bring out both the charm and depth in the material, steering clear of the sort of production that has stamped a date on some of his recordings in the past."

== Track listing ==
No.	Title	Length
1.	"Listen to What She Says"
2.	"A Bird in That Cage"
3.	"Healing Bones"
4.	"The Sun Ain't Gonna Shine Anymore"
5.	"Over the Lane"
6.	"When You Finally Gonna Come Through"
7.	"Never Again or Forever"
8.	"Heaven/Hell"
9.	"Two Friends"
10.	"How Many Wheels"
11.	"A Prayer (For Those Not Here)"
12.	"By and By"
