= Pal Shazar =

American singer/songwriter (born 1952)

- Born: December 24, 1952 (age 73)
- Origin: United States
- Genres: Rock, folk, new wave
- Occupations: Vocalist, Songwriter
- Years active: 1979–present
- Labels: Various, including RCA Records (1980-1982)
- Spouse: Jules Shear
- Website: www.palshazar.net

Pal Shazar is an American singer/songwriter. She was a founding member of the 1980s new wave pop group Slow Children, and married one of the band's producers, Jules Shear, in the late 1980s.

== Career ==
Slow Children released two albums on the RCA Records label, the self-titled debut in 1981 and Mad About Town in 1982. Shazar released several CDs, starting in the 1990s, on various labels.

Shazar co-wrote several songs with Matthew Sweet for his album Inside (1986), and wrote lyrics for Sara Lee for her album Make It Beautiful (2000).

As a painter, her artwork was featured on the cover of The Waterboys' Dream Harder album.

She self-published a book of lyrics and art, Pal Shazar: The Illustrated Lyrics, in 2008.

Shazar was featured on the cover of photographer Linda Troeller's 1998 book The Erotic Lives of Women, which included photos that were also used for the cover art of Shazar's 1997 album Woman Under the Influence.

Shazar has self-published two books of her graphic art. In 2013, Pal Shazar's La Strada, a collection of 42 paintings, inspired by the Fellini film La Strada. In 2015, You Don't Know Me, a collection of pastel portraits.

As a writer, Shazar self-published her first novel, Janitor, in 2011. An excerpt from the book was previously published in 2004 for the Penthouse feature "Women's Erotic Fiction". Her second novel, John, Paul, George & Hildegard, was published by HDG Global Publications in 2022. She later self-published a third novel in 2025, Shoofly.

Alexandria Quarterly Publications (AQP) published a collection of her short stories, Deliver Love, in 2017, and Volleyball on Tuinal, a collection of poems, in 2021. Shazar wrote a collection of songs based on her novel Janitor, and AQP published a book of the lyrics in 2019, which was packaged with a CD of the songs.

In January 2013, Shazar and her husband, singer/songwriter Jules Shear, released Shear Shazar. Their follow-up EP Mess You Up was released in 2014.

== Discography ==
=== Slow Children albums ===
- Slow Children - 1981
- Mad About Town - 1982
- CottonCloud9 - 2016

=== Pal Shazar CD albums ===
- Cowbeat of My Heart - 1991
- There's a Wild Thing in the House - 1995
- Woman Under the Influence - 1997
- Safe - 1999
- Shazar No. 5 - 2002
- The Morning After - 2006
- Psychedelicate - 2009
- Janitor - 2019
- Blondes Prefer Gentlemen - 2020

=== Pal Shazar CD EPs ===
- The Requiem Tapes - 1994
- Promo CD - 1995
- Penny for Your Thoughts - 1996

=== Other ===
- Walking and Talking Movie Soundtrack - 1996
