= The Great Puzzle =

Studio album by Jules Shear
- Released: 1992
- Genre: Pop
- Label: Polydor
- Producer: Stewart Lerman, Jules Shear

Jules Shear chronology
Unplug This (1991)	The Great Puzzle (1992)	The Trap Door (1992)

The Great Puzzle is an album by the American musician Jules Shear, released in 1992. The initial pressings of the album were packaged with the acoustic EP Unplug This.

"The Sad Sound of the Wind" was the first single. Shear promoted the album with a North American tour, including shows with Alison Moyet. The album sold fewer than 100,000 copies.

== Production ==
The album was produced by Stewart Lerman and Shear. Shear considered it to be made up of independent songs taken from his life experience; he tried to avoid writing songs that contained overt social themes. Shear employed the lower end of his vocal range on many tracks. Tony Levin played bass on the album. "Something Else to Me" is about the death of a former girlfriend.

== Critical reception ==
Professional ratings
Review scores
Source	Rating
AllMusic	4.5/5 stars
Calgary Herald	A−
Chicago Tribune	4/4 stars
The Encyclopedia of Popular Music	4/5 stars
The Indianapolis Star	2.5/4 stars
Los Angeles Times	3.5/4 stars
MusicHound Rock: The Essential Album Guide	3.5/5 stars

The Philadelphia Daily News deemed the album a "philosophical jigsaw of love's fragmented state." The Chicago Tribune praised the "fresh-sounding chord changes, articulate lyrics and irresistible choruses." The Calgary Herald determined that Shear "tempers his incredible facility for hook-drive melodicism with a bracing dose of metaphorical allusiveness."

Rolling Stone note that Shear "focuses primarily on the games lovers play ... Shear mitigates his skepticism with tenderness." The Washington Post called the title track one of Shear's "would-be metaphysical riddles." The Los Angeles Times stated that the album "finds him wading comfortably within the more eccentric rapids of the mainstream." The Gazette considered it to be "one of 1992's finest pop albums."

AllMusic wrote that "The Great Puzzle stands as Shear's high point."

== Track listing ==
No.	Title	Length
1.	"The Trap Door"
2.	"The Great Puzzle"
3.	"We Were Only Making Love"
4.	"The Sad Sound of the Wind"
5.	"Something Else to Me"
6.	"Make Believe"
7.	"Much Too Much"
8.	"Dreams Dissolve in Tears"
9.	"The Mystery's All Mine"
10.	"Jewel in a Cobweb"
11.	"Bark"
