= Slow Children =

American new wave pop group

- Origin: Los Angeles, California, United States
- Genres: New wave
- Years active: 1979–1983, 2010, 2015–2019
- Labels: Ensign Records, Jet Records
- Members: Pal Shazar; Andrew Chinich

Slow Children was an American new wave pop duo consisting of Pal Shazar and Andrew Chinich. They released two albums on a major label, Ensign, in 1981 and 1982, and a third self-released album in 2016.

== Discography ==
=== Albums ===
- Slow Children (1981)
- Mad About Town (1982)
- Cottoncloud9 (2016)

=== Singles ===
- "Staring at the Ceiling" (1979)
- "President Am I" (1981)
- "Spring in Fialta" (1981) - #50 Billboard Dance
- "Talk About Horses" (1981)
- "Vanessa Vacillating" (1982)
