= Douglas Brothers =

British photographers

- Type: Photographic imprint
- Founder: Andrew Douglas and Stuart Douglas
- Headquarters: London, United Kingdom
- Website: The Douglas Brothers website

Douglas Brothers is the photographic imprint of Andrew Douglas (10 August 1952) and Stuart Douglas (6 February 1962), British photographer/director siblings.

== Early life and education ==
The Douglas Brothers grew up in Southend, Essex, UK. Andrew Douglas studied Fine Art at Cardiff and Sunderland Polytechnic Colleges. Their older sibling, Graeme Douglas, was guitarist/songwriter with new wave rock band Eddie And The Hot Rods. Andrew designed an album cover for the Hot Rods, and this led to photographing album covers for the groups The Jam and The Cure.

In 1975, Andrew moved to London and began working as assistant to John Swannell and Lord Snowdon.

In 1989, Andrew was joined by younger brother, Stuart, a graduate of Barking College of Art. The pair began working as a collaborative duo under the solitary photographic imprint The Douglas Brothers.

Although they photographed a wide variety of subjects, the Douglas Brothers were known for their overtly moody and atmospheric portraiture. Technically, they employed mainly older photographic processes, and gained recognition for their sepia litho portraiture of people like Daniel Day-Lewis, Susan Sontag, Gabriel García Márquez, Salman Rushdie, Steven Soderbergh, Paul Auster, John Le Carré, Anish Kapoor, Kazuo Ishiguro and Jeanette Winterson. The Douglas Brothers photographic output was prolific, and their portfolio grew to incorporate abstract imagery, collage, nudes and reportage. Which brother had actually clicked the shutter was not disclosed.

== Periodicals, books, and music photography ==
The Douglas Brothers’ work appeared in magazine, newspaper, book publishing and advertising industries on both sides of the Atlantic. Publications included The Face, The New York Times, The Independent, New Scientist, Empire and Premiere.

Book publishers included Jonathan Cape and Faber and Faber. For the music industry, The Douglas Brothers photographed Ronnie Wood, Blur, Morrissey, Prefab Sprout, De La Soul, The Farm and Bryan Ferry.

== Annie Leibovitz GAP campaign ==
The Douglas Brothers' collaborative output and industry profile led to them being photographed by Annie Leibovitz for a GAP campaign alongside Miles Davis.

== International art world ==
The Douglas Brothers' photography crossed the art/commerce divide. Their work was exhibited in the Howard Greenberg Gallery in NYC, the Kate Heller Gallery in London, The Kopelkin in LA and the Parco Gallery in Tokyo.

== Video, Advertising and commercials ==
In 1991, The Douglas Brothers began directing music videos for recording artists such as Alison Moyet, Paul Young, Prefab Sprout and Ronnie Wood. Following a successful still campaign for Adidas, the Douglas Brothers were invited to direct full TV commercials, again as a collaborative duo.

== Working separately ==
In 1996, The Douglas Brother' made a decision to pursue individual careers.

Andrew Douglas moved to Los Angeles and directed the critically acclaimed BBC documentary Searching For The Wrong-Eyed Jesus. In 2005 he achieved number one US box office, directing the re-make of The Amityville Horror.

Stuart Douglas remained in the UK, where he directed a succession of commercials for Coca-Cola, British Airways, Sony and Airbus and others. His Kill Your Speed commercial for Road Safety received a D&AD silver and a New York One Show gold. He also directed Johnny X, an episodic web drama for Sony Ericsson, which generated in excess of eight million views.

== Reunion ==
In 2013, Andrew and Stuart Douglas reunited to work on a book documenting their photographic careers.

== Selected exhibitions ==
- 1994 Parco Gallery, Tokyo
- 1995 Howard Greenberg Gallery, Los Angeles
- 1996 Kate Heller Gallery, London
