= All Through the Night (Jules Shear song) =

1983 song by Jules Shear

Song by Jules Shear

from the album Watch Dog
- Released: 1983
- Length: 3:40
- Label: EMI America
- Songwriter: Jules Shear
- Producer: Todd Rundgren

"All Through the Night" is a song written and recorded by Jules Shear for his 1983 album Watch Dog. It was produced by Todd Rundgren.

Elliot Easton of American rock band the Cars helped produce an early version of the song. It was covered by the Cars, who did not use it on any of their albums, and by Cyndi Lauper, who included it on her debut album She's So Unusual (1983). Lauper's version peaked at number five on the Billboard Hot 100, becoming her fourth top five single in the US. An acoustic version was sung by Lauper on her 2005 album, The Body Acoustic, with additional vocals by Shaggy.

Shear said his own idea was that "All Through the Night" was a folk song, but that Lauper's electronic interpretation was more lucrative, paying for his New York apartment.

== Writing and composition ==
The song was written by Jules Shear for his 1983 debut solo album, Watch Dog. Produced by Todd Rundgren, the song was composed in a medium tempo. Lyrically, "All Through the Night" addresses the concept of love and its tug at heart-strings.

Shear recalled in an interview, "[it's] like a big bonus really. Cyndi Lauper does a song ('All Through the Night') that's on a solo record of mine. I just thought, 'No one's really going to hear this.' Then she does it, and it becomes a Top 5 song." "I'm just glad people know the songs, really. I think they're really good. The only problem is with people who don't know I wrote them. I do them and they think, 'God, he's doing that Cyndi Lauper song'", Shear said later.

== Reception ==
"All Through the Night" received little attention as Watch Dog never charted. Chris Woodstra from AllMusic highlighted the song when he reviewed Watch Dog. Dave DiMartino described it as "boasting". A reviewer from the Philadelphia Inquirer called it a "terribly good [song]".

== Cyndi Lauper version ==
"All Through the Night"

Single by Cyndi Lauper

from the album She's So Unusual
- B-side: "Witness"
- Released: September 3, 1984
- Recorded: 1983
- Studio: The Record Plant (New York City)
- Genre: New wave; synth-pop
- Length: 4:33
- Label: Epic
- Songwriter: Jules Shear
- Producer: Rick Chertoff

Cyndi Lauper singles chronology
"She Bop" (1984)	"All Through the Night" (1984)	"Money Changes Everything" (1984)

Music video
- "All Through the Night" (official audio) on YouTube

American singer Cyndi Lauper recorded a version for her 1983 album She's So Unusual. Shear said he was surprised that his "folk song" was interpreted by Lauper as "a drum machine and techno thing". According to Lauper, she wanted it to be just like Shear's version, with a bit more of an acoustic sound. However, she changed her mind, saying that she wanted to remake it in her own style.

=== Composition ===
"All Through the Night"
A 30 second sample from the song, which addresses the concept of love.

For her cover version, Lauper transposed the key up a minor third to A-flat major, and kept the tempo at the same 96 beats per minute as the original. The song is set in common time. Lauper's voice spans an octave and a fourth between G_{3} and D♭_{5}. Jules Shear himself makes a guest appearance on Lauper's version, singing a wordless falsetto melody near the end, as well as the lower harmony in the choruses. The chorus was unintentionally altered by Lauper from the Shear version when she sang the upper harmony vocal as the lead vocal. The song follows up "Time After Time"'s love and its tug at heart-strings concept.

=== Critical reception ===
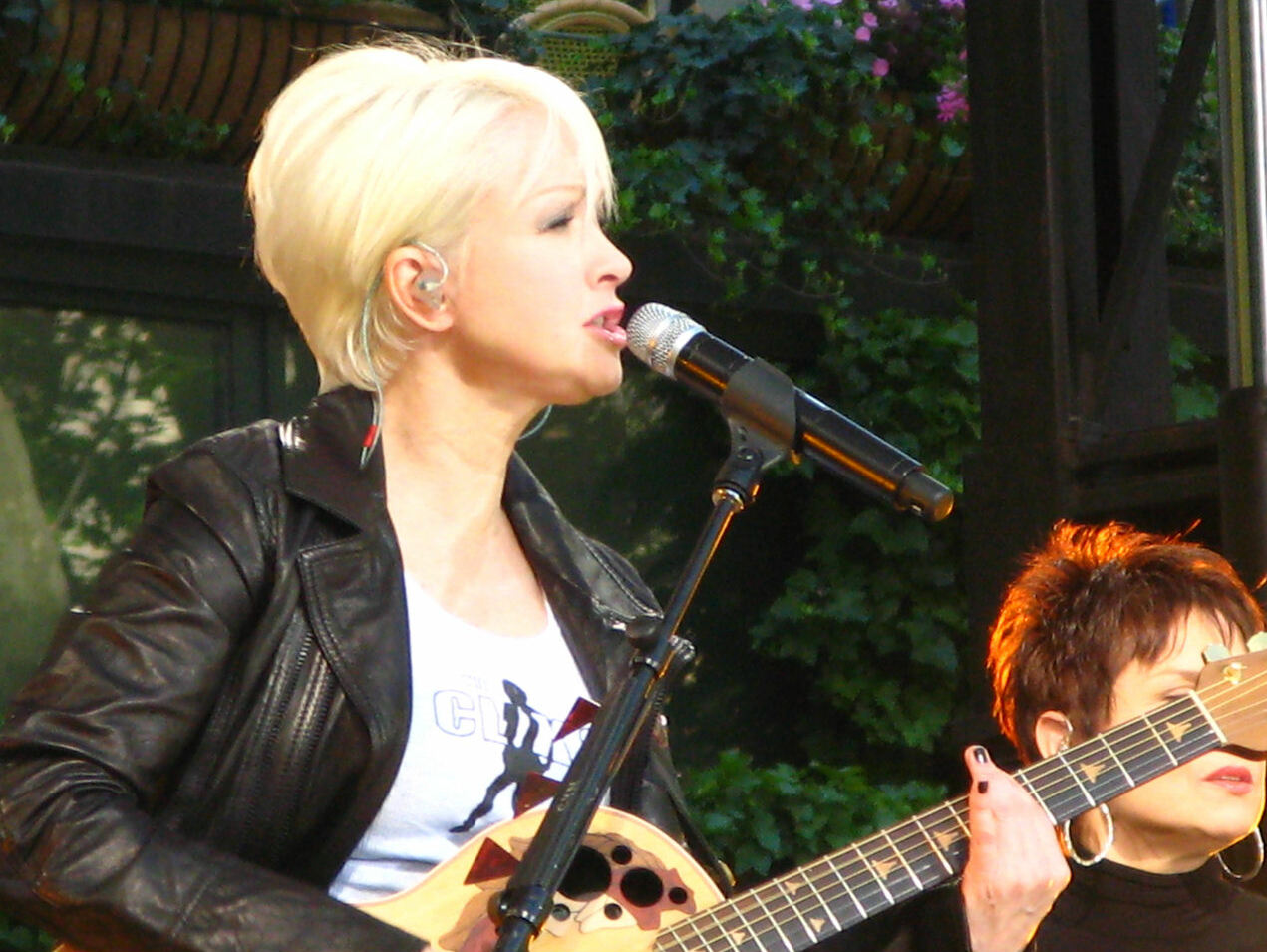
Lauper performing the song at the "Summer Concert" in New York.

Reception for her version was mostly positive. Don McLeese of the Chicago Sun-Times said that the song was the one that "showed her impressive range to best advantage." Cash Box said that "Cyndi Lauper strikes again with a strong vocal performance" and praised the "hypnotic keyboard melody" and "emotion charged harmonies." The Philadelphia Inquirer said that she had a "strong voice" in the song. However, another Philadelphia Inquirer review said that the song was "a not terribly good version of Jules Shear's terribly good [song]." Richard Harrington of The Washington Post believed that it was her most reflective song. Kevin East of Sensible Sound said that the song was "a heavy, melancholy tune." Leslie Gray Streeter of the Palm Beach Post said that the song was "lovely" and "delicate." Even Shear himself was a fan of Lauper's version, saying "The Cyndi Lauper thing where she did 'All Through the Night,' that was great because she did it so differently than the way I did. I liked that, too." However, the St. Petersburg Times did not like the song, saying that it was a "pedestrian filler number" on the album.

Kurt Loder of Rolling Stone said that Lauper "does an almost tasteful reading" of the song. Billboard magazine called the song "another tug at heartstrings" after Lauper's earlier single "Time After Time". Sal Cinquemani of Slant magazine said that the song emerged as one of "the greatest pop masterpieces of the '80s." Shear said that Lauper's version is his all-time favorite cover.

Writing for Music Week, Jerry Smith described the song as a "bouncy ballad with moody keyboards swirling beneath her whining voice" and remarked that it would "probably be another hit for her".

The song was later re-recorded by Lauper, for her album The Body Acoustic, an album in which she recorded acoustic versions of her favorite songs. This version included vocals by Shaggy. Charles Andrews of Audio/Video Revolution said of this version, "Acoustic guitar strumming continues into "All Through the Night" and then – whoa! – who's that toaster? It's Shaggy, ducking in and out with his own rapid-fire lyric take, an inspired bit of casting that turns the romantic ballad on its head." The song is also one of Lauper's more popular songs that she performs in live concerts.

=== Chart performance ===
"All Through The Night" was released in the United States in September 1984. It debuted on the Billboard Hot 100 at number 49, and reached a peak position of five in its 10th week, becoming Lauper's fourth consecutive top five in the U.S. This makes Lauper the first female singer to have four top five singles on the Hot 100 from one album. The song achieved some crossover success, peaking at number four on the Adult Contemporary chart for three weeks, and reaching a peak position of 38 on the Mainstream Rock Chart. "All Through the Night" made Lauper the first female singer to generate four top 10 hits in the Hot 100 from a debut album. The week ending January 19, 1985, while it was moving down the Hot 100, it was the biggest free-faller, falling from #33 to #64. In Canada, the single peaked at number seven on the RPM singles chart in December 1984, and was certified gold by the Music Canada in January 1985.

The single peaked at numbers 11 and 4 on the Hot 100 Sales and Airplay charts respectively.

In the United Kingdom, the song did not perform as well as Lauper's previous releases. It debuted at number 82 on the UK Singles Chart in November 1984, peaking at number 64, staying only six weeks on the chart. The single performed similarly throughout the rest of Europe, peaking at number 16 in Switzerland, and at number 35 in Germany. It was more successful in Austria, where it peaked at number five, becoming her fourth consecutive top five in the country.

=== Track listing ===
7" Single

1. "All Through the Night" – 4:33
2. "Witness" – 3:40

=== Credits and personnel ===
- Cyndi Lauper – lead vocals
- Jules Shear – backing vocals
- Rick Chertoff – producer
- Anton Fig – drums
- Rob Hyman – keyboards, synthesizers
- Eric Bazilian – bass guitar
- Lennie Petze – executive producer
- Janet Perr – design, cover art concept

Credits adapted from the album liner notes.

=== Charts ===
==== Weekly charts ====
1984 weekly chart performance for "All Through the Night"
Chart (1984–1985)	Peak position
Australia (Kent Music Report)	17
Austria (Ö3 Austria Top 40)	5
Canada Top Singles (RPM)	7
Canada Adult Contemporary (RPM)	1
Chile (Clasificación Nacional del Disco)	5
New Zealand (Recorded Music NZ)	19
Switzerland (Schweizer Hitparade)	16
UK Singles (Official Charts)	64
US Billboard Hot 100	5
US Adult Contemporary (Billboard)	4
US Mainstream Rock (Billboard)	38
US Cash Box Top 100	8
West Germany (GfK)	35

==== Year-end charts ====
Chart (1984/1985)	Position
Canadian RPM Singles Chart	75
US Top Pop Singles (Billboard)	65
US Cashbox Top 100 Singles	58

==== Certifications ====
Region	Certification	Certified units/sales
Canada (Music Canada)	Gold	50,000^{^}
United States (RIAA)	Gold	500,000^{‡}
^{^} Shipments figures based on certification alone.^{‡} Sales+streaming figures based on certification alone.

=== Release history ===
Release dates and formats for "All Through the Night"
Region	Date	Format(s)	Label(s)	ID	Ref.
United States	September 2, 1984	7-inch	Portrait; Epic	37-04639	
United Kingdom	October 22, 1984	7-inch	Portrait; Epic	A4849	

A 12-inch single was planned for release in the United Kingdom in the week of Monday 12 November 1984, but was ultimately cancelled.

== Other versions ==
Tori Amos performed the song at Royce Hall in 2005, with the recording featured on her The Original Bootlegs album series.

The band Sleeping at Last released their cover of the song as a single on the 4th of March, 2014. It was used in the soundtrack for A Discovery of Witches.
