= Jules Shear =

American singer-songwriter (born 1952)

- Born: Jules Mark Shear; March 7, 1952 (age 74); Pittsburgh, Pennsylvania, U.S.
- Genre: Pop
- Occupation: Singer-songwriter
- Instruments: Guitar; vocals
- Years active: 1976–present
- Labels: EMI America; IRS; Polydor; Columbia
- Spouse: Pal Shazar
- Website: julesshearshow.com

Jules Mark Shear (born March 7, 1952) is an American singer, songwriter, and guitarist. He wrote the Cyndi Lauper hit single "All Through the Night", the Bangles' hit "If She Knew What She Wants", and the Ignatius Jones and Allison Moyet hit "Whispering Your Name" and charted a hit as a performer with "Steady" in 1985.

== Life and early career ==
Shear was born in Pittsburgh, Pennsylvania, United States. He attended the University of Pittsburgh. He distinguished himself with the Pitt Glee Club where he led a special side ensemble called Wooden Music, which used acoustic instruments, in a foreshadowing of his "Unplugged" concept. One of his noted songs of the time, which he performed in concerts with the glee club, was "Always in the Morning". He left Pitt after three years in 1973, and headed to Los Angeles to pursue a music career.

Shear is married to singer-songwriter Pal Shazar.

== Career ==
Shear has recorded more than 20 albums to date. He made his first appearance on vinyl with Funky Kings (along with two other songwriters, Jack Tempchin and Richard Stekol). After their second album was rejected by the record label (Arista), he formed a new band, the critically acclaimed (but commercially unsuccessful) pop group, Jules and the Polar Bears. This band, with Shear writing and singing all songs, released two albums (Got No Breeding and fəˈnet̬·ɪks) on Columbia, merging a tight rock sound with the emerging synth-pop of the early 1980s. Their third album was rejected by their record label but released as Bad For Business in 1996, long after the band had broken up. With Jules and the Polar Bears finished, Shear bounced back with several solo albums. The first, Watch Dog, was produced by Todd Rundgren, and featured such players as Tony Levin on bass and Elliot Easton of The Cars on lead guitar. During the sessions, Shear and Easton struck up a friendship, based on their shared musical tastes, which led to various collaborations later on. The album featured the original version of "All Through the Night", which Cyndi Lauper eventually turned into a top-five hit. The album's opening number, "Whispering Your Name", reached No. 18 in the UK Singles Chart when Alison Moyet recorded her version of it; Moyet also performed the song on Top of the Pops.

Shear then released an EP, Jules, which contained selections from Watch Dog on one side, and two mixes of a club-style dance number, "When Love Surges", on the other side. Shear's next full-length album, The Eternal Return, was a highly polished, synthesizer-heavy effort, produced by Bill Drescher (of Rick Springfield fame). The album opened with "If She Knew What She Wants", which The Bangles made into a hit. It also featured what would prove to be Shear's only hit single under his own name, "Steady", which he wrote in collaboration with Cyndi Lauper. The single reached No. 48 in the U.S.

Shear went on to form two more bands, Reckless Sleepers and Raisins in the Sun. He also conceived (and hosted the first 13 episodes of) the MTV series Unplugged. His songs have been more commercially successful in the hands of other artists, notably Cyndi Lauper, whose recording of "All Through the Night" reached number 5 on the Billboard Hot 100 in 1984, and The Bangles, whose recording of "If She Knew What She Wants" reached number 29 in 1986. In 1988, singer-songwriter Iain Matthews (still using the spelling "Ian" for his first name at the time) recorded an album of Shear's material, Walking A Changing Line: The Songs of Jules Shear, with synthesizer-dominated arrangements. Some of these Shear penned songs were previously unreleased. Matthews previously recorded Jules Shear songs on other albums.

Shear was the subject of a song by 'Til Tuesday, "J for Jules", after the end of his relationship with that band's singer, Aimee Mann. Shear co-wrote the title track of that album, Everything's Different Now, with Matthew Sweet, and collaborated with Mann on the album's leading single, "(Believed You Were) Lucky", which reached No. 30 on the Modern Rock Tracks and No. 95 on the Billboard Hot 100.

Shear described his Sayin' Hello to the Folks as a "mix tape" of his favorite songs. "I felt like recording songs that I like a lot that I didn't write," he told Paste's Eliot Wilder in 2004. "I thought it would be good to record songs that didn't have a life but should've had a life. This is my attempt at giving them a life." He and Stewart Lerman, the album's producer, selected 12 songs from an original list of 60. These included covers of Todd Rundgren ("Be Nice to Me"), James Brown ("Ain't That a Groove"), Bob Dylan ("In the Summertime") The Dave Clark Five ("I've Got to Have a Reason") and Brian Wilson ("Guess I'm Dumb").

In January 2013, Jules and his wife, artist/songwriter Pal Shazar, released Shear Shazar. Produced by Julie Last, this is the first time Jules and Pal have made a full album together, though the two had recorded duets on Shear's albums before, such as "Here S/He Comes" on The Eternal Return and "Dreams Dissolve in Tears" on The Great Puzzle. This was followed later in the year by another Shear solo album, Longer to Get to Yesterday. In 2014 Shear Shazar followed up on their debut with the five cut EP Mess You Up.

== Chart singles written by Shear ==
The following is a list of Jules Shear compositions that have been chart hits.

Year	Title	Artist	Chart Positions			
Year	Title	Artist	US Hot 100	Australia	Canada	UK
1983	"Whispering Your Name"	Ignatius Jones		100		
1984	"All Through the Night"	Cyndi Lauper	5	17	7	64
1985	"Steady" co-written with Cyndi Lauper	Jules Shear	57			
1986	"If She Knew What She Wants"	The Bangles	29	31	29	31
1988	"If We Never Meet Again"	Reckless Sleepers			89	
1988	"If We Never Meet Again"	Tommy Conwell and the Young Rumblers	48			
1989	"(Believed You Were) Lucky" co-written with Aimee Mann	Til Tuesday	95			
1990	"Til The Fever Breaks" co-written with Blair Packham, Danny Levy and Matthew Greenberg	The Jitters			23	
1990	"The Bridge Is Burning" co-written with Blair Packham, Danny Levy and Matthew Greenberg	The Jitters			40	
1991	"I Love Her Now" co-written with Blair Packham, Danny Levy and Matthew Greenberg	The Jitters			55	
1994	"Whispering Your Name"	Alison Moyet				18

== About the albums ==
- Shear's first band, Funky Kings, also featured songwriter Jack Tempchin, and their self-titled debut contains the original version of Tempchin's song "Slow Dancing", which was a top 10 hit for Johnny Rivers. "Slow Dancing" and Shear's "So Easy to Begin" were both recorded by Olivia Newton-John on her 1977 album Making a Good Thing Better. "So Easy to Begin" was also covered by Art Garfunkel. As of this writing, Funky Kings has never seen domestic release on CD, and a second album recorded by them remains unreleased in any form.
- Jules and the Polar Bears released Got No Breeding in 1978 and fənĕtĭks in 1979. (The title of the second album is the phonetic spelling of "phonetics", and its lyric sheet and credits were printed phonetically). While the first album appeared on CD in the late 1980s, the second was not released on CD until 2006. The CD release of fənĕtĭks includes the contents of the 1980 Economy Package EP. A third album, Bad for Business, was rejected by their label, Columbia, leading to the band's breakup. Bad for Business was finally released on CD in 1995.
- Shear's solo debut, Watch Dog, was produced by Todd Rundgren and featured Elliot Easton of The Cars on lead guitar, as well as prolific studio bassist Tony Levin, and former Polar Bear Stephen Hague. In addition to featuring "All Through The Night", later a hit for Cyndi Lauper, the album opens with "Whispering Your Name", which was later a U.K. chart hit for Alison Moyet. Easton and Shear later collaborates on Easton's 1985 solo album, Change No Change.
- The Jules EP contains selections from Watch Dog, plus two mixes of a dance number, "When Love Surges".
- The Eternal Return opens with "If She Knew What She Wants", originally written in the first-person narrative (a cover version by The Bangles is sung in the third-person narrative, rendering the singer an outside observer). "Steady", co-written with Cyndi Lauper, was released as a single, complete with a video for MTV, and charted at No. 57. "Here S/He Comes" is a duet with Shear's wife, Pal Shazar.
- Demo-Itis is a collection of home and studio demos. Most of the songs had been previously unreleased, though demos of "All Through the Night", "If She Knew What She Wants", and other previous album tracks also appear.
- Shear formed a band called Reckless Sleepers with guitarist Jimmy Vivino (later of The Max Weinberg 7 and Conan O'Brien's Basic Cable Band), drummer Steve Holley (formerly of Wings), and bassist Brian Stanley. Their album, Big Boss Sounds!, was meant as a collaborative project. However, its only notable success, "If We Never Meet Again", was the one track on the album written by Shear alone. The edited single version received minor airplay, and the song was covered, first by Tommy Conwell & The Young Rumblers, and later by Roger McGuinn of The Byrds.
- The songs on The Third Party consist entirely of one acoustic guitar track, played by Marty Willson-Piper of The Church, and one vocal track by Shear. The lyric sheet included the chords to each song. "The Once Lost Returns" was co-written with Elliot Easton.
- Horse of a Different Color is a compilation of Shear's band and solo work. It includes "Nothing Was Exchanged", the opening track from Funky Kings—as yet the only track from that album released on CD.
- The Great Puzzle includes another duet with Pal Shazar, "Dreams Dissolve in Tears". The closing number, "Bark", prominently features Shear's unique style of playing guitar in an open tuning with his thumb (described later in this article).
- Unplug This was included as a bonus CD with early releases of The Great Puzzle. It contains eight acoustic arrangements of his more well-known songs. The title is a reference to the show MTV Unplugged, which Shear had hosted for its first several episodes.
- The Trap Door EP contains "The Trap Door", lead-off track from The Great Puzzle, along with three previously unreleased tracks from the Great Puzzle sessions: "His Audience Has Gone To Sleep", "She Makes Things Happen", and "Nothing Is Left Behind".
- Healing Bones includes Shear's first release of a cover, "The Sun Ain't Gonna Shine Any More" (originally a hit for The Walker Brothers). It also includes a song written with Rick Danko of The Band, "Never Again Or Forever". Elliot Easton played lead guitar on all tracks. The album was co-produced (with Peter Van Hooke) by Rod Argent (of Argent and The Zombies), who performed on all tracks along with Tony Levin, Jerry Marotta, and Easton.
- Between Us is a collection of original duets, featuring singers Paula Cole, Rosanne Cash, Carole King, Margo Timmins, Susan Cowsill, Angie Hart of Frente, and Shear's brother Rob, among others. Between Us also includes Shear's first released instrumental, "Entre Nous" (the French equivalent of the album title), in which Shear's guitar work interacts with Rob Wasserman's distinctive fretless bass stylings. Wasserman is perhaps best known for his own album of duets.
- Allow Me is a full-band project of original material. Shear wrote the album's closing track, "Too Soon Gone", with Stan Szelest of The Band, who recorded their own version on their album Jericho. Shear sang backing vocals on The Band's version.
- Saying Hello to the Folks is composed entirely of covers, including songs by The Dave Clark Five, Bob Dylan, Todd Rundgren, Brian Wilson, and others.
- Raisins in the Sun was a one-off collaboration with Harvey Brooks, Paul Q. Kolderie, Jim Dickinson, Chuck Prophet, Sean Slade, and Winston Watson, recorded in May 1999 and released by Rounder Records two years later.
- Dreams Don't Count was released on the student record label MAD Dragon Records through Drexel University. Produced by Jules and long-time friend Stewart Lerman, this album is full of melodic acoustic tracks, and features accordion and cello in its arrangements.
- For his next solo album, More, Shear began billing himself as Jules Mark Shear, as seen in the CD's title and credits. He is also credited with playing lead guitar for the first time on a major release (as opposed to his home recordings on Demo-itis). The album was released on his own label, Funzalo Records.
- Shear was a collaborator on Elliot Easton's 1985 solo album Change No Change, co-writing all songs and singing background vocals. In the liner notes to the CD release, both Easton and Shear cite the closing ballad, "Wide Awake", as their favorite track from the album.

== Guitar technique ==
Shear's unique guitar style derives from tuning the guitar to an open G, but with an E in the bass, equivalent to an E minor seventh chord. The guitar is not strung left-hand style (with the strings installed in reverse order), but is held upside down, with the fretting hand's thumb wrapped down over the upper edge of the neck, barring across the strings, and the low E being at the thumb's tip.
