= Weak in the Presence of Beauty (song) =

1986 single by Floy Joy

Single by Floy Joy

from the album Weak in the Presence of Beauty
- B-side: "You and Me"
- Released: 13 January 1986
- Length: 3:24
- Label: Virgin
- Songwriters: Michael Ward; Rob Clarke
- Producer: Don Was

Floy Joy singles chronology
| "Operator" (1985) | "Weak in the Presence of Beauty" (1986) | "Friday Night" (1986) |

"Weak in the Presence of Beauty" is a song written by Michael Ward and Rob Clarke, and originally recorded by their band, Floy Joy. It was released on 13 January 1986 as the lead single from their album of the same name. In 1987, English singer Alison Moyet released a version of the song which was a hit across Europe and Australasia.

== Floy Joy version ==
"Weak in the Presence of Beauty" marked a new beginning for Floy Joy as the band had undergone line-up changes since the release of their 1984 debut album Into the Hot. Both lead vocalist Carroll Thompson and founding member Shaun Ward left the group in 1985. Michael Ward decided to continue as Floy Joy, with the band's percussionist and backing vocalist Desy Campbell becoming the lead singer and multi-instrumentalist Rob Clarke joining the group.

"Weak in the Presence of Beauty" was released in January 1986 as the lead single from their upcoming album of the same name. The song reached No. 85 on the UK Singles Chart, but was a bigger success in Australia, reaching No. 29 on the Kent Music Report chart. In Canada, it reached No. 68 on the RPM 100 Singles chart and No. 14 on the RPM Adult Contemporary chart.

Speaking to The Face in 1986, Michael Ward said the song's title was inspired by a conversation he had with a girl. He said, "This girl was saying that she didn't trust me and I said, just off the cuff, 'What can I do, I'm weak in the presence of beauty'. I still don't know where it came from." In a later interview with The Times, Campbell was asked if he felt cheated that the song was a hit for Moyet, but not for Floy Joy. He said, "On the contrary, my association with that song has and continues to open many doors for me and I'm very proud to have been part of a little piece of pop history."

=== Critical reception ===
Upon its release, Anna Martin of Number One commented, "[This] sees Floy Joy adopting a slightly more melodious sound. Less thrash and more dash. One to watch." Jim Whiteford of the Kilmarnock Standard described the song as "a hummable, commercial ditty" and a "sweet mid-paced dancer" which he believed would gain chart success if it received some attention from radio. Andy Hurt of Sounds remarked that the song's hook was reminiscent of Sal Solo's "San Damiano". In the US, Billboard wrote, "Floy Joy, much praised but barely charted (like Working Week), sound like they have the key to both the U.S. and U.K. charts with 'Weak in the Presence of Beauty', a Don Was production that's sort of Shannon-meets-"Every Breath You Take". Addictive."

=== Track listing ===
7" single

1. "Weak in the Presence of Beauty" – 3:24
2. "You and Me" – 3:07

12" single

1. "Weak in the Presence of Beauty" (Extended Version) – 5:12
2. "You and Me" – 3:07

=== Charts ===
| Chart (1986) | Peak position |
|---|---|
| Australia (Kent Music Report) | 29 |
| Canada RPM Adult Contemporary | 14 |
| Canada RPM 100 Singles | 68 |
| UK Singles Chart | 85 |

== Alison Moyet version ==
"Weak in the Presence of Beauty"

Single by Alison Moyet

from the album Raindancing
- B-side: "To Work on You"
- Released: February 1987
- Length: 3:37
- Label: CBS; Columbia
- Songwriters: Michael Ward; Rob Clarke
- Producer: Jimmy Iovine

Alison Moyet singles chronology
| "Is This Love?" (1986) | "Weak in the Presence of Beauty" (1987) | "Ordinary Girl" (1987) |

In 1987, "Weak in the Presence of Beauty" was released by English singer Alison Moyet as the second single from her second studio album Raindancing. Her version became a hit in the UK and throughout Europe.

=== Background ===
Following the release of her successful debut album Alf, Moyet decided to move to Los Angeles where she remained for almost a year. Once settled, Moyet's manager hired Jimmy Iovine to produce her second studio album. Aware of Floy Joy's "Weak in the Presence of Beauty", Moyet chose to record the song for the album. It was released as the second single from Raindancing in February 1987, and was also the second and final single from the album in the States, where it was released in August that year.

Moyet later said in 2004 that she only recorded the song as she knew it would be a hit single. Appearing on the This Morning show, Phillip Schofield asked Moyet why she disliked the song, to which she replied: "Oh, because I know how cynical I was being when I recorded it. I recorded it 'cause I knew it was a hit rather than the fact that I loved it, and that will teach me, you know? You have a massive hit with something you're not particularly fond of, and it's not a good feeling."

Later speaking to The Quietus in 2013, Moyet stated: "What I must say is that it's sometimes very easy to sit there and rescind responsibility, but sometimes I couldn't be arsed. That's the truth of it. We can all make the right choices, but sometimes we're just too lazy to. And sometimes I was just too lazy to do it myself. "Love Letters" and "Weak in the Presence of Beauty" – neither song I enjoy now – they're both my fault. I found them."

=== Promotion ===
A music video was filmed to promote the single. It was directed by Pete Cornish and produced by Front Row Films.

=== Critical reception ===
On its release, Paul Simper of Number One noted the "pleasant production and leisurely chorus" and Moyet's voice "blossoming in a discreetly unexpected way". Pete Clarke of Smash Hits praised Moyet's "superb voice" but added that "somebody's forgotten to give her a decent song this time around and there's nothing quite as sad as a voice in search of a tune." Barney Hoskyns of New Musical Express considered the song to be a "veritable hit" from the "Jimmy Iovine conveyor-belt". He felt it was "almost as bland and obvious" as "Is This Love?"

Lesley O'Toole of Record Mirror praised "Weak in the Presence of Beauty" as Floyjoy's "second finest song" behind "Until You Come Back to Me", but added that Moyet's version was a "lacklustre offering without the luscious tones of Desy Campbell". She felt the song had a "shimmer of class", but considered the "dodgy brass interlude" and "nauseating 'darling, I love you' ad libs" to make for a "dubious arrangement". Ann Scanlon of Sounds called it a "soppy splash through the shallowest of puddles". Bobby Lynch of The Kerryman, who stated that Floy Joy's "brilliant" original should have been a hit, commented, "Not an obvious single for Moyet to record but the production is pleasant and its different." US magazine Billboard considered it to be a "potential hit" and commented on the "loping melody and feel" which "shouldn't be overlooked". Cash Box praised Moyet's "powerhouse performance" on the track.

In a review of Raindancing, Spin singled out the song as a "tangible effort to push Moyet into the 'til tuesday camp of semisweet pop". Musician wrote, "Moyet's interpretive gifts have grown, and Iovine's understated production takes pains not to get in the way, which is why the likes of 'Sleep Like Breathing' or 'Weak in the Presence of Beauty' hold such lasting allure." Josh Lee of Attitude retrospectively commented, "Big choruses that demand to be sung along to don't come more insistent than 'Is This Love?' and 'Weak in the Presence of Beauty'." In a 2015 retrospective on Moyet's career, Classic Pop included the song as one of their twenty favourite Alison Moyet tracks and stated, "She disowned it; we loved it."

=== Track listings ===
7" single

1. "Weak in the Presence of Beauty" - 3:37
2. "To Work on You" - 4:13

12" single #1

1. "Weak in the Presence of Beauty" (Extended Remix) – 6:04
2. "Weak in the Presence of Beauty" (Single Version) - 3:37
3. "To Work on You" - 4:13

12" single #2

1. "Weak in the Presence of Beauty" (Extended Remix) – 6:04
2. "To Work on You" - 4:13
3. "Take My Imagination To Bed" - 3:41

=== Weekly charts ===
Weekly chart performance for Alison Moyet's cover
| Chart (1987) | Peak position |
|---|---|
| Australia (Kent Music Report) | 30 |
| Belgium (Ultratop 50 Flanders) | 18 |
| Germany (GfK) | 18 |
| Ireland (IRMA) | 4 |
| Italy Airplay (Music & Media) | 18 |
| Netherlands (Dutch Top 40) | 16 |
| Netherlands (Single Top 100) | 25 |
| New Zealand (Recorded Music NZ) | 7 |
| Norway (VG-lista) | 4 |
| Switzerland (Schweizer Hitparade) | 23 |
| UK Singles (Official Charts) | 6 |

=== Year-end charts ===
1987 year-end chart performance for Alison Moyet's cover
| Chart (1987) | Position |
|---|---|
| Europe (Eurochart Hot 100 Singles) | 91 |

== Eddie & the Tide version ==
In 1987, American band Eddie & the Tide released a Keith Olsen-produced version as the lead single from their third studio album Looking for Adventure. The song's music video was directed by John Jopson and produced by Michael Segel. It achieved breakout rotation on MTV. In a review of the band's version, Cash Box described it as "a classic-sounding pop/rocker with hooks and a clean, commercial sheen that sparkles". Billboard considered it to be "mainstream, midtempo album rock". The Hard Report noted the "straight on assault at the hit single" with the track and added, "We rate it safe but soulful, a la Huey Lewis meets Eddie Money."
