= Floy Joy (band) =

English music group

- Origin: Sheffield, England
- Genres: Jazz-funk
- Years active: 1982–1986
- Label: Virgin

Floy Joy was an English band formed in Sheffield, England, who recorded two studio albums and had minor success with several singles.

== History ==
Floy Joy was formed in Sheffield in 1982 by brothers Michael (horns) and Shaun Ward (keyboards, bass and guitar). With Elana Harris as the vocalist, the band's debut single, "Answer Through Me", was released in May 1983 through Virgin. It was produced by Andy Hernandez.

Harris left the band in 1983 and the Wards continued working on material together. Although they recorded with a few English producers, the output was shelved as they were not satisfied with their working relationships with the producers. The Wards admired the work of American musician and producer Don Was and were interested in working with him. They travelled to America to find the producer and, after tracking him down to a hotel in New York, played their demo tape to him. He responded favourably to the material and agreed to produce them at his studio in Detroit. The recording sessions for Into the Hot were carried out over the course of around nine weeks.

After the backing tracks were recorded and the Wards returned to England, they set about looking for a new vocalist and Carroll Thompson joined the band after she was introduced to the brothers through Virgin's A&R department. Was then came to London to record Thompson's vocals. Shortly after this, Floy Joy recruited Desy Campbell on percussion and backing vocals after seeing him perform with another Sheffield band.

Into the Hot was released by Virgin in September 1984, but it was not a commercial success. It was preceded in July 1984 by the single "Burn Down a Rhythm", which also failed to chart. The second single, "Until You Come Back to Me", was released in October 1984 and reached No. 91 in the UK Singles Chart. The third and final single, "Operator", was released in January 1985 and reached No. 86.

In 1985, Thompson departed the band and embarked on a solo career under Virgin. She felt she had no input in the band's decisions and became disillusioned with Floy Joy. Shaun Ward also left to pursue other musical projects. Campbell then became Floy Joy's lead vocalist and multi-instrumentalist Rob Clarke joined the group.

In January 1986, the new line-up released the single "Weak in the Presence of Beauty", which reached No. 85 in the UK and No. 29 in Australia. The song became a big hit in Europe and Australasia in 1987 when covered by Alison Moyet and released as the second single from her album Raindancing. Floy Joy's second album, Weak in the Presence of Beauty, also produced by Don Was, did not achieve commercial success, and neither did its second single "Friday Night in This Cold City". Floy Joy disbanded soon after.

In 1990, Campbell and Shaun Ward formed the band Everyday People with Lloyd T. Richards. They worked with producer Stewart Levine on their album You Wash... I'll Dry, which spawned five singles, including "Headline News" and "I Guess It Doesn't Matter".

== Members ==
1983

- Elana Harris – vocals
- Michael Ward – horns
- Shaun Ward – keyboards, guitar

1984–85

- Carroll Thompson – vocals
- Michael Ward – horns
- Shaun Ward – bass, keyboards, guitar
- Desy Campbell – percussion, backing vocals

1985–86

- Desy Campbell – vocals
- Michael Ward – horns
- Rob Clarke – keyboards, bass

== Discography ==
=== Albums ===
Year	Album	Peak chart positions	
Year	Album	NZ	AUS
1984	Into the Hot	40	―
1986	Weak in the Presence of Beauty	―	100
"—" denotes releases that did not chart or were not released.

=== Singles ===
Year	Single	Peak chart positions	
Year	Single	UK	AUS
1983	"Answer Through Me"	―	―
1984	"Burn Down a Rhythm"	―	―
1984	"Until You Come Back to Me"	91	―
1985	"Operator"	86	—
1986	"Weak in the Presence of Beauty"	85	29
1986	"Friday Night in This Cold City"	151	―
1986	"Penny in My Pocket"	―	―
"—" denotes releases that did not chart or were not released.
