= Hopelessly in Love =

Studio album by Carroll Thompson
- Released: 1981
- Studio: Easy Street Studios, London
- Genre: Lovers rock
- Length: 40:03
- Label: Carib Gems
- Producer: C & B Productions

Carroll Thompson chronology
Hopelessly in Love (1981)	Carroll Thompson (1982)

Hopelessly in Love is the debut album by English lovers rock singer Carroll Thompson, released in early 1981 by Carib Gems Records. The album followed, and includes, her two Leonard Chin-produced singles "I'm So Sorry" and "Simply in Love", which topped the British reggae charts. Thompson co-created C & B Productions, a first for a female reggae singer in Britain, and under this credit wrote and produced the album, working additionally with producer Anthony Richards. Backed by Thompson's C & B band, the album exemplifies the soul-infused mellow reggae style typical to lovers rock and Thompson's sweetly voice, with her songs discussing themes of romance and love.

Upon release, the album reached number 22 on the UK Indie Albums chart but did not make the national albums chart and received little airplay. Despite this, the album eventually sold over 35,000 copies, an unusually high amount for a lovers rock album, and is considered a classic of the genre, helping establish Thompson on the British reggae scene. Singers Darren Hayman and Sarah Cracknell have named it an influence on their own work, and in 2007, The Guardian named it among "1000 Albums to Hear Before You Die".

== Background and recording ==
Born and raised in Letchford, Herefordshire in one of the area's first immigrated Jamaican families, Carroll Thompson grew up on a mix of Jamaican music, including ska and reggae, as well as artists like Sarah Vaughan, Gladys Knight and Stevie Wonder, despite her being "spiritually grounded". Her singing voice nurtured in school and church choirs, and in her mid-teens she backing vocals on numerous pop songs following a brief tenure in the Frank Farian-managed disco group Sugar Cane. In the late 1970s, her solo career began on German pop label Hansa Records, but moved in a reggae direction after meeting Hilbert Grant, a Jamaican producer and engineer who introduced Thompson to fellow British-based Jamaican producer Leonard Chin.

With Chin as producer, Thompson recorded the self-penned songs "I'm So Sorry" and "Simply in Love", which marked the debut of her mellow lovers rock sound, mixing reggae and rocksteady. Released by Santic Records as singles in 1980 and 1981 respectively, backed with dub versions of the A-sides, both songs topped the British reggae charts and sold impressively. The chart-topping success of the former song was unexpected as lovers rock was only beginning to become popular in the reggae charts, but Thompson found making a living from music difficult, explaining: "I don't think producers really took women seriously." Wanting full control over her music, she co-founded C & B Productions, a first for a female reggae singer in Britain, and formed a studio band. Grant introduced her to former Trojan Records marketer Anthony Richards, noted for helping Ken Booth achieve a number one hit with "Everything I Own" in 1974, and he went on to produce her debut album Hopelessly in Love with her, with C & B Productions receiving production credit. Engineered and mixed by Mike Stevenson, the album was recorded at London's Easy Street Studios, and features Thompson's band.

== Composition ==
Hopelessly in Love was largely written by Thompson and showcases lovers rock's fusion of soul vocals, reggae rhythms and melancholic melodies. Her two earlier singles appear on the album with eight new songs. According to writers Ann Powers and Evelyn McDonnell, the album was one of several in the 1980s which disregarded typical portrayls of romance, wherein women are lonely without their male partners, with its broader themes. They write "although she was on the whole hopelessly in love, simply in love, oh so sorry or brokenhearted, in 'No, You Don't Know' she sings about the plight of an unmarried mother who is left waiting for her unfaithful lover." James Hamilton of Record Mirror described the 68bpm "I'm So Sorry" as a "sweetly winsome" and "squeakily-sung" song with a catchy hook. Thompson wrote the song after her first break-up at an early age, explaining that, "having no understanding as to how and why these things happen, I wrote a poem about it. It was a time of analysing." She wrote the title track as a coming-of-age song, "with the environment, young friends going through the same thing at the same time…first love."

== Release and reception ==
The album cover was photographed by Des Bailey on Milton Avenue, London NW10, behind the Stonebridge estate and near the C & B office in Harlesden, and depicts Thompson sat on a car bonnet. She later said: "It was exciting as [it was] my first ever photoshoot. The photographer brought a fur coat and draped it over me, I felt self conscious and slightly uncomfortable but it became an iconic album sleeve." According to Powers and McDonnell, the slightly fuzzy look of the photograph and "the title Letraset over her legs" made it appear cheap. The Brent location of the photograph was significant as Thompson had begun her musical career in Harlesden and frequented the Apollo Club to hear reggae music. 34 years after the album cover was snapped, Alex Bartsch revisited the location for his Kickstarter-funded book Covers (2016), showing him photograph the original London locations depicted on British reggae sleeves.

Hopelessly in Love was released in early 1981 by Carib Gems Records, and peaked at number 22 on the UK Indie Albums chart. Despite not entering the national albums chart or receiving much radio play, it had sold 25-30,000 copies by 1983, and ultimately sold over 35,000 copies. According to writer Lloyd Bradley, while there were a relatively low amount of lovers rock albums compared to singles, which tended to sell strongly, Hopelessly in Love was one of several albums in the genre which shifted enough copies "that under different circumstances would have got them into the lower reaches of the charts," alongside Louisa Mark's Breakout (1981) and the Investigators' First Case (1982). The album was positively reviewed by Black Music & Jazz Review who praised Thompson's unique voice. At the GLR Reggae Awards in 1982, Thompson won "Best Female Performer", while "Hopelessly in Love" won "Best Song".

== Legacy ==
According to Sheryl Garratt of the NME, Hopelessly in Love established Thompson as a British reggae star and became "a lover's rock classic: strong tunes, great dance rhythms, and a beautiful voice — sweet, but not too sickly." According to the Black History Month website, the album brought Thompson international fame and "[secured] her position as one of the UK's finest female singer/songwriters." The album helped signal the popularity of lovers rock alongside other black female artists of the late 1970s and early 1980s, foreshadowing the emergence of dozens more singers in the genre. In 2007, The Guardian included Hopelessly in Love in their list of "1000 Albums to Hear Before You Die", writing that it captured lovers rock at its height, "when scores of London singers, mainly female, allied soul vocals to tough reggae rhythms and forlorn melodies." They further described the album as "a sort of dub-wise version of Joni Mitchell's Blue." In 2018, Red Bull Music included the album in their list of "10 essential UK dub and reggae albums," having been chosen for inclusion by BBC Radio 1Xtra DJ Seani B, who recalled it being popular at house party soundsystems.

Darren Hayman of Hefner has listed Hopelessly in Love among his favourite albums, adding in a list compiled for The Quietus: "This album wraps me up just like Carroll's fur jacket wraps her up on the cover. This album takes care of me and walks me home. Everything is rounded and wholesome. Everything is like a warm bread roll. If you’ve fallen out of love, this album makes you fall back in. When I put it on, I wave my head around and close my eyes." In a similar list compiled for MusicOMH on his musical influences, he said: "It’s a blanket. It’s a Sunday morning. I could live forever with this one album alone." In another list for The Quietus, Sarah Cracknell of Saint Etienne named it among her favourite albums, describing the record as possessing "that distinct London feel, lovely high-pitched singing and broken-hearted sentiments" and referring to its consensus as "a really important lovers rock record." Estelle included the title track in a list of songs which influenced her album Lovers Rock (2018), adding: "Another classic voice, she floated; it’s easy with her."

== Track listing ==
All songs written by Carroll Thompson except where noted

=== Side one ===
1. "Yesterday" – 3:43
2. "I'm So Sorry" – 4:26
3. "No You Don't Know" – 3:23
4. "Sing Me a Love Song" (Alan Weeks/Thompson) – 4:18
5. "Mr. Cool" – 4:04

=== Side two ===
6. "Merry-Go-Round" (Weeks/Thompson/Cleveland Watkiss) – 4:24
7. "Simply in Love" – 4:06
8. "When We Are as One" – 3:54
9. "What Colour?" (Thompson/Elroy Bailey) – 3:52
10. "Hopelessly in Love" – 3:53

== Personnel ==
Adapted from the liner notes of Hopelessly in Love

Musicians

- Carroll Thompson – vocals, lyrics, arrangement
- Elroy Bailey – bass, arrangement
- Cleveland Watkiss – percussion, arrangement
- Alan Weeks – lead guitar, rhythm guitar, arrangement
- Jah Bunny – drums
- Noel Salmon – electric piano (Fender Rhodes)
- Desmond Mahoney – percussion, drums
- Chris Hedges – synthesiser
- Vin Gordon – trumpet

Other

- Mike Stevenson – mixing, engineering
- C & B Productions – production
- Des Bailey – photography
