= Into the Hot =

Into the Hot may refer to:

- Into the Hot (Gil Evans album), 1962
- Into the Hot (Floy Joy album), 1984
