= Movement 98 =

Movement 98 was a Paul Oakenfold project on Circa Records, built around the vocals of Carroll Thompson, and also featuring input from Steve Osbourne and Rob Davis. Their debut single, "Joy and Heartbreak", was a mid-paced soul release, based on the melody of Erik Satie's "Les Trois Gymnopedie". It reached #27 in the UK Singles Chart in May 1990.
