= Modern Girl =

Modern Girl may refer to:

- Modern girl, a Japanese Flapper
- "Modern Girl" (Meat Loaf song), 1984
- "Modern Girl" (Sheena Easton song), 1980
- "Modern Girl", a 1980 song by James Freud
- "Modern Girl", a 2005 song by Sleater-Kinney from The Woods
- "Modern Girl", a 2023 song by Bleachers from the album Bleachers
- The Modern Girl, a 1935 Indian Hindi-language drama film by B. S. Rajhans
- Modern Girls (1937 film), a Hungarian film
- Modern Girls, a 1986 American film
  - Modern Girls (soundtrack)

== See also ==
- "Modern Woman", a 1986 song by Billy Joel
