= Modern Girls (soundtrack) =

Soundtrack album from the film Modern Girls by various artists
- Released: 1986
- Recorded: 1985–1986
- Venue: Various
- Studio: Various
- Genres: Soundtrack, electronic, rock
- Length: 40:12
- Label: Warner Bros. Records
- Producer: Various

Modern Girls: Original Motion Picture Soundtrack is a soundtrack album to the film of the same name, released in 1986 by Warner Bros. Records

== Release ==
The soundtrack was released in the US by Warner Brother Records on 12" vinyl (catalogue number 25526-1) to coincide with the release of the movie, which opened in theaters in late 1986.

== Track listing ==
Side one
No.	Title	Writer(s)	Producer(s)	Length
1.	"But Not Tonight" (Depeche Mode)	Martin Gore	Depeche Mode; Gareth Jones; Daniel Miller; Robert Margouleff	4:27
2.	"How Many Lovers" (Anthony and the Camp)	Anthony Malloy; Henley Goddard; Earl Thomas	Jellybean	4:01
3.	"Weak in the Presence of Beauty" (Floy Joy)	Michael Ward; Rob Clarke	Don Was	3:20
4.	"The Girl Pulled a Dog" (Female Body Inspectors)	Michael Whitfield; Norman Whitfield, Jr.	N. Whitfield, Jr.	3:36
5.	"Girls Night Out" (Toni Basil)	Franne Golde; Paul Fox; T. Basil	F. Golde; P. Fox	4:16

Side two
No.	Title	Writer(s)	Producer(s)	Length
1.	"Concentration Breakdown" (George Black)	G. Black	G. Black; Victor Flores	4:26
2.	"Jealousy" (Club Nouveau)	Jay King; Michael Marshall; Marcus Thompson; Alex Hill	J. King; Foster & McElroy	4:46
3.	"No Promises" (Icehouse)	Iva Davies; Robert Kretschmer	Rhett Davies	3:41
4.	"One Way Love" (TKA)	Marco Olivo; Jeff Mann	M. Olivo; J. Mann; Tony Moran; Albert Cabrera	4:23
5.	"Some Candy Talking" (The Jesus and Mary Chain)	William Reid; Jim Reid	The Jesus and Mary Chain	3:16
Total length:				40:12

== Additional music ==
The following songs, used in the film, did not appear on the soundtrack album:

- "Bond of Addiction" – Scott Rogness
- "Safare" – Scott Rogness
- "Game I Can't Win" – Dennis Quaid
- "Something Inside Me Has Died" – Kommunity FK
- "Passion" – Lions & Ghosts
- "Love Changes" – Jackie Warren
- "Eyes of Fire" – Chris Nash
- "Everywhere I Go" – The Call
- "Roof's On Fire" – The Band of Blacky Ranchette
- "Iko Iko" – The Belle Stars
- "Angels In The Night" – France Joli
- "Dont Think Twice" – France Joli
- "Dancin" – Chris Isaak

== Personnel ==
Adapted from the album's liner notes.

- Gary Goetzman – executive producer
- Joey Gardner – executive producer ("One Way Love")
- Sharon Boyle – music supervisor
- Michael Ostin; Steven Baker – album supervision
- Kevin Laffey – album coordinator
- Gabrielle Raumberger – album package design
- Bernie Grundman – mastering (at Bernie Grundman Mastering, Hollywood)

== Release history ==
Year	Label	Format	Catalog
1986	Warner Bros. Records	LP	1-25526
1986	Warner Bros. Records	Cassette	4-25526
