= Weak in the Presence of Beauty =

Weak in the Presence of Beauty may refer to:

- "Weak In the Presence of Beauty" (song), 1986 single by Floy Joy, covered in 1987 by Alison Moyet
- Weak In the Presence of Beauty (album), 1986 album by Floy Joy
