= Headline News (disambiguation) =

Headline News or HLN is an American television news network.

Headline News may also refer to:

- Headline News (album) or the title song, by Atomic Rooster, 1983
- "Headline News" ("Weird Al" Yankovic song), 1994
- "Headline News" (Everyday People song), 1990
- "Headline News", a song by Edwin Starr, 1966
- Sky News Breakfast, formerly Headline News, an Australian television program broadcast on Sky News Regional

== See also ==
- Headline, in newspapers, text indicating the nature of the article below
- All Headline News, a US-based news agency, 2000–2010
- CNN Philippines Headline News, an English-language morning newscast, 2015–2016
