= Operator (Floy Joy song) =

Single by Floy Joy

from the album Into the Hot
- B-side: "Mission"
- Released: 21 January 1985
- Length: 3:53
- Label: Virgin
- Songwriters: Shaun Ward, Michael Ward
- Producer: Don Was

Floy Joy singles chronology
"Until You Come Back to Me" (1984)	"Operator" (1985)	"Weak in the Presence of Beauty" (1986)

"Operator" (a.k.a. "Operator Operator") is a song by British group Floy Joy, which was released in 1985 as the third and final single from their debut studio album Into the Hot (1984). The song was written by band members Shaun Ward and Michael Ward, and produced by Don Was.

Floy Joy made their debut in the UK Singles Chart in 1984 with "Until You Come Back to Me". In January 1985, "Operator" was released as the follow-up single and reaching No. 86, remaining in the Top 100 for four weeks.

== Promotion ==
A music video was filmed to promote the single, showing the group performing the song in a bar-like venue. The music video featured two additional performers; Desi Campbell on backing vocals (the band's unofficial backing vocalist and bongo player) and Kenny Crawley on drums. Campbell would later become the lead vocalist for the group following Thompson's departure.

== Critical reception ==
On its release, Paul Massey of the Evening Express stated, "Their last single should have been a hit, and this change of style might do it. Snappy, rhythmic, and great vocals again from Carroll Thompson." Jerry Smith of Music Week described the song as "an excellent, funky dance track" and noted Thompson's "smooth, soulful vocal" and the "dynamic, lively production" by Was. He felt the song should provide Floy Joy with their first hit.

Chris Heath of Smash Hits commented, "Floy Joy seem to be everybody's tip for the top this year. I'm not sure that this will be the one to break them though. It energetically mixes funk, soul, and jazz but the actual song is a bit weak." Frank Hopkinson of Number One wrote, "A lacklustre record from a group tipped for great things. Floy Joy attempt to give us their new soul vision but are hampered by a beat that's far too slow and a song that's desperately dull."

== Track listing ==
7" Single

1. "Operator" - 3:53
2. "Mission" - 3:04

7" Single (UK limited edition release with "Until You Come Back to Me" single)

1. "Operator" - 3:53
2. "Mission" - 3:04
1. "Until You Come Back to Me" - 4:12
2. "Theme from the Age of Reason" - 1:22

12" Single

1. "Operator (Extended Version)" - 5:40
2. "Mission" - 3:50

== Personnel ==
Production

- Don Was – producer, engineer
- John 'Tokes' Potoker – mixing
- Steve 'Doc Ching' King – assistant engineer
- Michael Brauer – drum engineer

Other

- Simon Crump – sleeve

== Charts ==
Chart (1985)	Peak position
UK Singles Chart	86
