= Weak in the Presence of Beauty (album) =

Studio album by Floy Joy
- Released: 1986
- Length: 37:38
- Label: Virgin
- Producer: Don Was

Floy Joy chronology
Into the Hot (1984)	Weak in the Presence of Beauty (1986)

Weak in the Presence of Beauty is the second and final studio album by the English band Floy Joy, which was produced by Don Was and released in 1986 by Virgin Records.

The album's title track was released as the lead single and reached No. 85 on the UK singles chart. "Friday Night in This Cold City" was also released as a single but did not chart.

== Background ==
In 1985, Floy Joy underwent member changes with the departure of founding member Shaun Ward and singer Carroll Thompson. The band's percussionist and backing vocalist, Desy Campbell, became the lead vocalist and multi-instrumentalist Rob Clarke joined the group.

Speaking of the album, Michael Ward told Music Week in 1986, "The album is as abstract as the first one, but you've got to look a little below the surface, read the lyrics and listen to the album, then you'll get a complete picture."

== Critical reception ==
Professional ratings
Review scores
Source	Rating
Ottawa Citizen	2/4 stars
Record Mirror	3.5/5 stars
Sounds	4/5 stars

Upon its release, Glyn Brown of Sounds noted that the "delicious" album is "less hard-shelled soul than crafted Motown pop". She praised Campbell's "harp of a throat" and added that "not one track [that] disappoints, though we fly from Tabu-active swivel to aching street acapella". Paul Massey of the Aberdeen Evening Express wrote, "The soul-tinged tracks beat the funk-based tunes hands down, but a real joy." He added the album was worth buying for the "brilliant" "Penny in My Pocket" which he described as "a sad late-night lament sung with extraordinary feeling".

Jim Reid of Record Mirror wrote, Weak in the Presence of Beauty is at times a beautifully wrapped record [with] careful crafted professionalism. But, in the main, this work is like so much antiseptic in the hands of a vocalist who is straining and clawing for the right touch. Desy Campbell is not a bad singer, it's just that those tasty Floy touches deserve something more than what amounts to an ersatz soul vocal." He added that the album "stands too much on one level" in comparison with the band's debut Into the Hot, which he considered "invigorating" with a "constantly interesting mix of images and moods". In Canada, Mike Abrams of the Ottawa Citizen commented, "New vocalist Desy Campbell's vocals are more aggressive and muscular than his predecessor. [His] vocals have added a harder edge to the band's pop songs. The enthralling single, 'Weak in the Presence of Beauty', the sax-driven 'Friday Night' and the soulful 'Penny in My Pocket' are three solid pop performances."

== Track listing ==
All tracks written by Michael Ward and Robert E. Clarke; except where noted.

1. "Weak in the Presence of Beauty" – 3:28
2. "Friday Night" – 6:36
3. "Penny in My Pocket" – 4:22
4. "Too Drunk to Funk" – 3:49
5. "Ask the Lonely" (William "Mickey" Stevenson, Ivy Jo Hunter) – 3:43
6. "Chinese A-Go Go" – 4:01
7. "Crackdown" – 2:49
8. "Walking in the Night" – 3:26
9. "This is My Time" (Desy Campbell) – 1:59
10. "It Makes No Difference to Me" – 3:26

== Singles ==
- "Weak in the Presence of Beauty" – UK No. 85, AUS No. 29
- "Friday Night in This Cold City"

== Personnel ==
Floy Joy

- Desy Campbell – lead vocals, backing vocals
- Michael Ward – saxophone, flute, backing vocals
- Robert E. Clarke – bass, drum machine

Additional musicians

- Luis Resto – piano, synthesizer, Emulator 2, melodica
- Don Was – synthesizer, mandolin
- G. E. Smith, Randy Jacobs, Bruce Nazarian, John "Dred" Edmed – guitar
- John Edmund – additional guitar (tracks 2, 3)
- David McMurray – tenor saxophone
- Joe Teir – mouth trumpet
- Steve Ferrone – drums
- Kevin Tschirhart – congas
- Paul Riser – orchestrations (track 5), additional orchestrations
- Harry Bowens – backing vocals, backing vocal arrangements
- Sweet Pea Atkinson, Donny Ray Mitchell, Buster Marbury, Carol Hall – backing vocals
- Anthony Was - child backing vocals (track 7)

Production

- Don "Don" Was – producer
- Garzelle McDonald – production assistance
- Frank Filipetti – mixing (tracks 1, 4, 7–10), additional engineering
- John "Dred" Edmed – remixing (tracks 2–3, 5–6)
- Steve "Doc Ching" King – engineer
- Chris Irwin – additional engineering
- Noah Baron, Bill Miranda, Mike Bigwood – assistant engineers

Other

- Mick Haggerty – artwork
- Clare Muller – photography

== Charts ==
Chart (1986)	Peak position
Australia (Kent Music Report)	100
