= Grandview, U.S.A. =

1984 film by Randal Kleiser

- Theatrical poster
- Directed by: Randal Kleiser
- Written by: Ken Hixon
- Produced by: William Blaylock; Peter W. Rea
- Starring: Jamie Lee Curtis; C. Thomas Howell; Patrick Swayze; Jennifer Jason Leigh; Troy Donahue
- Cinematography: Reynaldo Villalobos
- Edited by: Robert Gordon
- Music by: Thomas Newman
- Production company: CBS Theatrical Films
- Distributed by: Warner Bros. Pictures
- Release date: August 3, 1984
- Running time: 97 minutes
- Country: United States
- Language: English
- Budget: $5 million
- Box office: $4,743,119

Grandview, U.S.A. is a 1984 American comedy-drama film directed by Randal Kleiser. The film stars Jamie Lee Curtis, Patrick Swayze, C. Thomas Howell, Jennifer Jason Leigh, and Troy Donahue.

== Plot ==
Tim Pearson, a Grandview High School senior, wants to study oceanography in Florida. His father Roger loans him his brand new Cadillac to go to the prom with Bonnie Clark. Later, making out in the car near a stream, it rolls in, so they walk to "Cody's Speedway" for a tow.

When Bonnie's father comes for her, he punches Tim in anger. Mechanic Michelle "Mike" Cody defends him, and has local demolition derby driver Ernie "Slam" Webster tow the car with Tim. Slam stops at the bowling alley asking for his wife Candy, who hasn't been there, suspecting she is cheating.

The next morning, when Tim visits his father at work, he tells Tim he does not want him to drive his car again. Running into Mike, he thanks her for helping him with the car and asks to drive in the derby.

Tim goes out to the Speedway, where he meets Mike's mentally challenged brother, Cowboy. Later on that night, Mike goes to the bar to see her uncle, Bob, asking to borrow $10,000 to fix up the Speedway. He doesn't have it but wants to help. Just then, they both hear a drunken Slam beating on a video game. Mike and Bob help him out to his truck, and she and Slam talk about old times.

Hung over at work the next morning, Slam is sent home by his boss. When he arrives, he finds Candy with Donny. Enraged, he jumps on his car demanding she come back to him, in the process, Donny shoots himself in the foot. At the hospital, Candy doesn't press charges, but won't come home. She files a restraining order so Slam cannot be within 50 feet of her.

That night, when Mike sees Slam sleeping in his truck, she comforts him, believing he does not really love Candy but is only afraid of being alone. Later, he invites Mike out to dinner but she can't. (She has a County Commission meeting, but doesn't say so.)

Tim and his dad also go to the meeting, and he tells him he's declining his ISU scholarship to go to Florida to study oceanography; Roger isn't too pleased. At the Town Hall, Roger asks Tim to get something in his office. There, he sees the Speedway renovation plans. At the meeting, Mike requests more time to get the money to fix up the Speedway, but the commission won't give it to her. Tim reveals they plan to put a country club and golf course on Mike's land. (Roger has already bought all of the adjacent property to the Speedway and will go bankrupt if the deal doesn't go through.) Tim then argues with his father and leaves.

Tim runs into Mike, who thanks him for saving her place. Going for a burger, she invites him over, and they spend the night together. Mike offers Tim a car to drive in the Derby. In the morning Slam shows up, finding them in bed together; he leaves upset, thinking Mike turned him down because of Tim.

Later on that day, Roger apologizes to Tim about the fight. He asks Tim to reconsider Illinois State University, but he still wants to go to Florida.

At the Speedway, Mike sells her old cars to make extra money, upsetting Cowboy, who runs off crying.

Slam goes to his house and sees his stuff on the lawn, getting wet under the lawn sprinkler. Donny taunts him by the door with a shotgun, telling him he called the cops. Slam leaves with his wet things.

Later that night, at the Demolition Derby, Tim is competing against Slam in the race. At the climax, Slam crashes into Tim, injuring him. Thinking he did it on purpose, Mike sends him off the track. Then, as Candy and Donny are having sex in his house, Slam bulldozes it and he is arrested.

As Tim and Mike drive home from the hospital, they see firetrucks and find the Speedway has burned down. Mike asks her mother what has happened, but she doesn't know. In the morning, however, the police discover that the gas tank was unlocked. Cowboy had started the fire because Mike sold the old cars. Tim and Mike talk, and she admits she is in love with Slam.

Mike bails Slam out of jail and he offers to help fix the Speedway, but she says she'll sell to Roger so they can afford to start a life together. She then asks him for a favor.

Tim is on his way to Chicago. As the bus leaves a car comes alongside, forcing him off; Slam gives Tim the old car and money for his trip to Florida. Mike and Slam, now a couple, go to the local parade.

== Cast ==
- Jamie Lee Curtis as Michelle "Mike" Cody
- C. Thomas Howell as Tim Pearson
- Patrick Swayze as Ernie "Slam" Webster
- Jennifer Jason Leigh as Candy Webster
- Carole Cook as Betty Welles
- John Philbin as Cowboy
- Ramon Bieri as Roger Pearson
- Elizabeth Gorcey as Bonnie Clark
- M. Emmet Walsh as Mr. Clark
- Kathryn Joosten as Mrs. Clark
- Troy Donahue as Donny Vinton
- William Windom as Bob Cody
- Michael Winslow as Spencer
- Camilla Hawke as Mrs. Pearson
- Melissa Domke as Susan Pearson
- John Cusack as Johnny Maine
- Joan Cusack as Mary Maine
- Bruno Alexander as Forman (credited as Bruno Aclin)
- Fred Lerner as Tucker Smith
- Tim Gamble as Larry Hurlbuck
- Larry Brandenburg as Mickey
- Steve Dahl as "Moose" the DJ
- Fern Persons as Teacher
- Milford Watson as Jail Bird Extra

== Soundtrack ==
1. "Take Me Home to Grandview, U.S.A." by Air Supply
2. "School Is Out" by Jack Mack and the Heart Attack
3. "No One Left at All" by Angel and the Reruns
4. "Get Up and Dance" by Larry Michaels
5. "Steely Man" by Frank Musker
6. "Would It Be All Right to Come Back Home" by Rosalie Winkler Karalekas
7. "Maybe We Won't Have to Say Goodbye" by Rosalie Winkler Karalekas
8. "Let's Talk It Over in the Morning" by Sammy Vaughn
9. "Nightpulse" by Roger Love
10. "Der Kommissar" by Robert Ponger and Falco
11. "This Time" by Delta
12. "Face the Odds" by Gerard McMahon
13. "Running Wild, Running Free" by Eddie & the Tide
14. "No Rest for the Wicked" by Mark Goldenberg
15. "In Need of Love" by Herns and Ray
16. "I Want to Do It with You" by The Pointer Sisters

== Production ==
The original music score is composed and orchestrated by Thomas Newman. It was filmed on location in Pontiac and Fairbury, Illinois.

== Release ==
After being out of print on VHS for many years, the film was released on DVD on October 4, 2011.

== See also ==
- List of American films of 1984
