= Everyday People (English band) =

- Origin: UK
- Genres: Funk
- Years active: 1990–1991
- Label: SBK Records

Everyday People was a funk music group formed in England who recorded one album and had success with a few singles across Europe.

== History ==
Everyday People were formed in 1990 by vocalist Desi Campbell, bassist Shaun Ward and guitarist Lloyd Richards. Campbell and Ward were previously members of Floy Joy together in 1985–86. In the mid-to-late 1980s, Campbell moved to Los Angeles and Ward moved to New York's club land. When both returned to Yorkshire, they decided to form Everyday People in 1990 with local guitarist Lloyd Richards. The newly established record label SBK Records signed the band, and they soon won the Radio One UK battle of the bands competition, and also went to Japan to play in the international finals at the famous Budokan.

For their debut album, the band worked with producer Stewart Levine. In a 1990 interview with the group, Campbell noted "We'd had enough experience with producers and would really have preferred to do it ourselves. But Stewart didn't want to change a thing. He told us at the beginning that all he wanted to do was enhance what we already had, and that's exactly how it turned out." The band flew out to Bearsville, New York and recorded an entire album without samplers or sequences. You Wash... I'll Dry was released in 1990 by SBK, and reached No. 26 in Germany. The first single, "Headline News",gained some minor interest, peaking at No. 99 in the UK, No. 83 in the Netherlands and No. 53 in Germany.

"I Guess It Doesn't Matter" followed as the second single and was the band's most successful release. It peaked at No. 93 in the UK, No. 24 in Switzerland and No. 34 in Germany. The UK-only single "This Kind of Woman" failed to chart, however the fourth single "Second Nature" managed to peak at No. 54 in Germany in 1991. A fifth and final single, "Place in the Sun", did not find commercial success. During the year, the band toured Europe extensively, however the minor success caused the band to dissolve.

== Members ==
- Desi Campbell – vocals
- Shaun Ward – bass guitar
- Lloyd T. Richards – guitar

== Discography ==
=== Albums ===
- You Wash... I'll Dry (1990)

=== Singles ===
Year	Single	Peak chart positions					Album
Year	Single	UK	AUS	NED	GER	SWI	Album
1990	"Headline News"	99	140	83	53	—	You Wash... I'll Dry
1990	"I Guess It Doesn't Matter"	93	—	—	34	24	You Wash... I'll Dry
1990	"This Kind of Woman" (UK only)	—	—	—	—	—	You Wash... I'll Dry
1991	"Second Nature" (Continental Europe only)	—	—	—	54	—	You Wash... I'll Dry
1991	"Place in the Sun" (Continental Europe only)	—	—	—	—	—	You Wash... I'll Dry
"—" denotes single that did not chart or was not released.
