= Friday Night (Floy Joy song) =

"Friday Night in This Cold City"

Single by Floy Joy

from the album Weak in the Presence of Beauty
- Released: 1 April 1986
- Length: 6:35 (album version); 3:32 (single version)
- Label: Virgin
- Songwriters: Michael Ward; Robert E. Clarke
- Producer: Don Was

Floy Joy singles chronology
"Weak in the Presence of Beauty" (1986)	"Friday Night in This Cold City" (1986)

"Friday Night" (also known as "Friday Night in This Cold City") is a song by the English band Floy Joy, released on 1 April 1986 as the second and final single from their second studio album, Weak in the Presence of Beauty (1986). It was written by Michael Ward and Robert E. Clarke, and produced by Don Was.

== Background ==
Speaking to Record Mirror in late 1985, Mike Ward said "Friday Night" was "about the frustration of wanting to break out". He pointed out that the song, along with album tracks "Penny In My Pocket" and "Chinese a-Go Go", all shared a similar theme, "There's a kind of vibe running through some of the tracks, where it's about one guy who's down on his luck. Rather than saying, 'Everybody dance!' it's about real life."

== Release ==
"Friday Night" was released on 7-inch and 12-inch vinyl in the UK and Europe. For its release as a single, the six-and-a-half minute album version of "Friday Night" was edited and remixed by Mike Bigwood and Michael Ward. The song was given the extended title of "Friday Night in This Cold City" on the sleeve. A 'club mix' was created by John Edmed for the 12-inch release.

To coincide with the release of the single, Floy Joy embarked on a 10-date UK tour from 18 April. "Friday Night" received some airplay on BBC Radio 1 but was more successful in gaining airplay on Independent Local Radio. The band's previous single, "Weak in the Presence of Beauty", had reached No. 85 in the UK singles chart, but "Friday Night" failed to enter the Top 100. It was the band's final single release.

== Music video ==
The song's music video was directed by Peter Care and produced by GLO Productions. It achieved heavy rotation on Music Box. In Italy, it achieved play on DeeJay Television.

== Critical reception ==
On its release, William Shaw of Smash Hits considered "Friday Night" to be "a thumping disco tune" but added that the "gosh-isn't-it-tough-on-the-streets words are definitely a bit silly". He added, "Floy Joy have been almost famous for ages; this could well do the trick." Andrew Panos of Number One gave the single a four out of five star rating. He wrote, "After repeated plays this tune becomes quite memorable. A slight Motown feel about the production does a lot to help. However we could have done without the corny lyrics." In the 26 April 1986 issue of Music & Media, the song was listed as a "sure hit" on the "Euro Tip Page".

Roger Morton of Record Mirror praised "Friday Night" as "a warming piece of even-tempered pop" which he felt was "thankfully less saccharine soaked" than "Weak in the Presence of Beauty". He commented, "Meaty drumming and sax curlicues step aside for a luminous vocal, which makes the most of a slightly chorus heavy song." Paul Massey of the Aberdeen Evening Express considered it a "mid-tempo number that has a strong vocal line and catchy hook". He felt that Floy Joy "deserve to have a chart hit", but felt they "never will".

Gavin Martin of the NME stated, "Fusing Eastern modal touches with a neo-industrial clatter, they've tried to give this an acid tang, but it's a miscalculation. The core of the song is driven so hard, declaimed so forcefully, that it drys up, cracks and disintegrates with no sense of loss or longing being grasped or explored." He considered the song to be about "a lonesome guy in unfriendly surrounds". Paul Benbow of the Reading Evening Post noted, "A Brit-oul band who deserve success but I fear this is a bit nondescript to get it for them." Jim Whiteford of the Kilmarnock Standard praised the song as "catchy, upward pushing mid-tempo rock" and believed it had the potential to reach the top 10. Whiteford added, "Lyrics concern the exhaustion and suppression felt by a city dweller at the approach of the weekend... the sax concerns itself with wailing in sympathy!"

In a review of Weak in the Presence of Beauty, Music Week commented, "The title track didn't make it as a single, the inferior but easier on the ear 'Friday Night' could do the trick." Mike Abrams of the Ottawa Citizen picked "Friday Night" as one of the album's "best cuts" and described it as "sax-driven" and a "solid pop performance".

== Track listing ==
7" single

1. "Friday Night" – 3:32
2. "Friday Night" (Joyce Davenport Mix) – 3:23

12" single

1. "Friday Night" (Club Mix) – 5:36
2. "Friday Night" (Joyce Davenport Mix) – 3:23

== Personnel ==
Floy Joy

- Desy Campbell – lead vocals, backing vocals
- Michael Ward – vocals, saxophone
- Robert E. Clarke – bass, drum machine

Production

- Don 'Don' Was – producer
- Mike Bigwood, Michael Ward – remix (7-inch version and Joyce Davenport Mix)
- John 'Dred' Edmed – mixing, remix (Club Mix)
- Steve 'Doc Ching' King – engineer
- Frank Filipetti, Chris Irwin – additional engineering
- Noah Baron, Bill Miranda, Mike Bigwood – assistant engineers
- Tim Young – mastering

Other

- Mick Haggerty – design
- Robin Barton – photography

== Charts ==
Chart (1986)	Peak position
UK singles chart	151
