= Looking for Adventure =

Studio album by Eddie and the Tide
- Released: 1987
- Length: 37:12
- Label: Atco
- Producer: Bobby Corona; Keith Olsen; B. A. Robertson

Eddie and the Tide chronology
Go Out and Get It (1985)	Looking for Adventure (1987)	Dig Down Deep (1988)

Looking for Adventure is the third studio album by Eddie and the Tide, released by Atco in 1987. It was the band's second and final album for a major label. The album received its first CD release in 2009 by Wounded Bird Records.

"Weak in the Presence of Beauty" and "Waiting for the One" were released as singles. The music video for "Weak in the Presence of Beauty" was directed by John Jopson and "Waiting for the One" directed by Rodney McDonald.

== Reception ==
Professional ratings
Review scores
Source	Rating
AllMusic	2/5 stars

Upon release, Billboard described the album as "very strong". They noted the "anthemic" "This Life of Ours", the slower "Stand a Little Rain" and lead single "Weak in the Presence of Beauty". Jack Kraft of The Morning Call felt the album contained "several good pop-rock dance tunes" such as "Waiting for the One" and "If You Want to Rock". He concluded: "Looking for Adventure shows why Eddie Rice & Co are a popular club band. It may also go a long way in helping translate that popularity into chart success."

== Track listing ==
No.	Title	Writer(s)	Length
1.	"Waiting for the One"	B. A. Robertson, Steve "Eddie" Rice	4:11
2.	"This Life Is Ours"	Rice	2:51
3.	"Stand a Little Rain"	Robertson, Rice	4:00
4.	"Weak in the Presence of Beauty"	Michael Ward, Rob Clarke	3:28
5.	"Love Goes On"	Rice	3:34
6.	"If You Want To Rock"	Rice	3:35
7.	"One with the Sea"	Rice	3:54
8.	"Making History"	Robertson, Rice	4:03
9.	"Bitter Harvest"	Robertson, Rice	3:44
10.	"Let It Be Love"	Robertson, Rice	3:52

== Personnel ==
Eddie and the Tide

- Eddie Rice - lead vocals, rhythm guitar, arranger
- Johnny Perri - lead guitar, backing vocals, arranger
- Chris Rieger - keyboards, arranger
- George Diebold - bass, arranger
- Scott Mason - drums, backing vocals, arranger

Production

- Bobby Corona - producer (tracks 1–3, 5–7, 10)
- Keith Olsen - producer (track 4)
- B. A. Robertson - producer (tracks 8–9)
- Dave Luke, Guy Roche, Wally Buck - engineers
- Brian McGee - mixing (tracks 1–3, 6, 8–10)
- Brian Foraker - mixing (track 4)
- Tom Size - mixing (tracks 5, 7), engineer
- Greg Fulginetti - mastering

Other

- Bob Defrin - art direction
- Billy Douglas, Pat Johnson - photography
