= Jean Adebambo =

British singer (1962–2009)

- Born: 1 July 1962; Islington, London, England
- Died: 15 January 2009 (aged 46) Leytonstone, London, England
- Genres: Lovers rock
- Years active: 1980–1986, 2007–2009
- Label: Ade J

Jean Adebambo (1 July 1962 – 15 January 2009) was a British singer, best known for songs in the lovers rock genre. It is believed she died by suicide.

== Biography ==
Jean Adebambo was born in Islington, London, to a Montserratian mother and a Nigerian father. Her entry into the music business was by chance; she was invited to do a cover version of two records entitled "Again" and "Reunited" by Ital Records in the early 1980s, while she was studying to be a nurse.

She eventually met the Jamaican producer Leonard Chin, for whom she recorded the single "Paradise", and had a successful solo career, mainly recording for her own Ade J label. A string of hits followed such as the singles "Reaching For A Goal", "Hardships of Life" and "Pipe Dreams". Despite all the success, Adebambo quit the music industry and went back into the medical profession and became a health visitor in Bermondsey.

A successful lovers rock concert was held in 2008 at the Brixton Academy, where Adebambo was persuaded to perform and restart her music career; however, she was found dead at home in Leytonstone on 15 January 2009, aged 46.

A tribute concert was held on at Hackney Empire on Sunday 15 March 2009, with the aim of raising funds to help raise her two daughters.

== Discography ==
=== Albums ===
- Feelings (1983), Ade J
- Off Key Loving (1985), Ade J

=== Singles ===
- "Paradise" (1980), Santic
- "Reaching for a Goal" (1981), Third World
- "Say That You Love Me" (1981), Ade J
- "Pipe Dreams" (1982), Ade J
- "Hardships of Life" (1983), Ade J
- "Tell Me" (1983), Ade J
- "I Like It" (1984), Ade J
- "Never Before" (1984), Ade J
- "I've Made Up My Mind" (1986), Ade J
- "All the Way" (1987), Ade J
- "Pain" (1987), Now Generation
- "Never Gonna Give You Up" (1987), Pioneer International
