= You Wash... I'll Dry =

Studio album by Everyday People
- Released: 15 October 1990
- Length: 47:05
- Label: SBK
- Producer: Stewart Levine

You Wash... I'll Dry is the only studio album from English funk group Everyday People. Produced by Stewart Levine, it was released in 1990 by SBK Records.

== Background ==
Everyday People were formed in 1990 by vocalist Desi Campbell, bassist Shaun Ward and guitarist Lloyd Richards. Having signed to the newly established record label SBK, the band flew out to Bearsville, New York to record their debut album with Stewart Levine as producer. In a 1990 interview, Ward said: "It was the same studio in which the Isley Brothers cut all their big records, which made it quite special for us." All songs on the album were original songs written by the group, although "Second Nature" featured a co-writing credit to Ward's brother Michael Ward as well. You Wash... I'll Dry was released in 1990 by SBK. It was not a commercial success, except in Germany, where the album peaked at No. 26. During the year, the band toured Europe extensively, however the minor success caused the band to dissolve.

The album spawned five singles. The first was "Headline News" gained some minor interest, reaching No. 99 in the UK, No. 83 in the Netherlands and No. 53 in Germany. "I Guess It Doesn't Matter" followed as the second single and was the band's most successful release. The song peaked at No. 93 in the UK, No. 24 in Switzerland and No. 34 in Germany. "This Kind of Woman" failed to make any national impact. The fourth single "Second Nature" managed to peak at No. 54 in Germany. "Place in the Sun", the final single, failed to chart.

Speaking of working with Levine, Campbell said: "We'd had enough experience with producers and would really have preferred to do it ourselves. But Stewart didn't want to change a thing. He told us at the beginning that all he wanted to do was enhance what we already had, and that's exactly how it turned out. After listening to some other guy, who said he hoped we didn't mind if he changed the odd chorus here and there it was great relief!" Ward added: "The biggest relief for us was the relaxation Stewart engendered in the studio. In England you get the feeling of fear: Look guys were spending £1000 a day here, so lets get it done. Stewart wasn't like that at all. As long as we got something down on tape by the end of the day, he was happy. It never felt like work at any time."

== Release ==
The album was released on vinyl and CD across Europe. The CD version was purposely issued for the UK and Europe, while the LP was released across Europe in places such as Germany, Italy and Spain.

== Critical reception ==
Professional ratings
Review scores
Source	Rating
AllMusic	2/5 stars
Record Mirror	4.5/5 stars

On its release, Pete Lewis of Record Mirror described Everyday People as having a "distinctive brand of unrestricted, non-formularised soul music", with the album being of "consistently high quality". He praised the songs for being "all well structured and rich in melody", the arrangements for being "quite rousing" and "frequently reaching strong climaxes", and Campbell's "flexible, soulful voice". He also noted the "melting pot of different styles", but with a "strong common base in Sixties R&B". CD Review felt the band had "evolved a sound that is a mix of styles and influences", adding, "As such, each track on the band's debut comes across as wholly familiar, yet somehow fashions an identity all its own."

Blues & Soul commented, "Although this album might not be of instant appeal to many, Everyday People have put together an album that revisits the almost sadly forgotten artform of 'real' music, as in musicians actually playing instruments. This said, [they] have gone off on their own tangent coming up with their brand of unaffected gritty, raw R&B with guitars, Hammond organs, live basses, (real) drums, etc firing on all cylinders." Peter Kinghorn of the Newcastle Evening Chronicle wrote, "Their soulful approach works best on the brass-punctuated "Make Him Wait", the slow, deliberate "I Guess It Doesn't Matter", Motown-style "Good as Gold", catchy "Place in the Sun" and punchy "Let Someone Love You"."

In North America, Scott Benarde of The Palm Beach Post described the album as a "fusion of pop, soul and R&B" and "one of the sleeper records of the year". He added it was "bursting with energy and passion", with "soaring melodies" and "sharp and imploring" vocals. Tom Harrison of The Province stated, "Inevitably comes a return to values once held so dear in soul and R&B circles - great songs, singing and spirit. These come dressed up in contemporary production considerations, but the intent is there and the lack of pretension is an unspoken plus."

== Track listing ==
No.	Title	Writer(s)	Length
1.	"Make Him Wait"	Desi Campbell, Lloyd T. Richards, Shaun Ward	3:45
2.	"Headline News"	Campbell, Richards, S. Ward	5:00
3.	"I Guess It Doesn't Matter"	Campbell, Richards, S. Ward	4:15
4.	"More Than a Friend"	Campbell, Richards, S. Ward	3:45
5.	"Good as Gold"	Campbell, Richards, S. Ward	3:56
6.	"This Kind of Woman"	Campbell, Richards, S. Ward	5:46
7.	"Second Nature"	Campbell, Richards, S. Ward, Michael Ward	3:31
8.	"Place in the Sun"	Campbell, Richards, S. Ward	5:10
9.	"I've Been There"	Campbell, Richards, S. Ward	4:00
10.	"All I See"	Campbell, Richards, S. Ward	3:57
11.	"Let Somebody Love You"	Campbell, Richards, S. Ward	3:47

== Personnel ==
- Desi Campbell - lead vocals
- Lloyd T. Richards - guitar
- Shaun Ward - bass, backing vocals

Additional personnel

- Stewart Levine - producer
- Daren Klein - engineer, mixing
