= Eddie & the Tide =

American band

- Origin: Santa Cruz, California, United States
- Genres: Rock
- Years active: 1981–1993
- Labels: Spin Records; Atco Records
- Past members: Steve "Eddie" Rice; Scott Mason; Johnny Perri; George Diebold; Chris Rieger (1986 to 1990); Jeff "Cazz" McCaslin (1983 to 1986)

Eddie & the Tide were an American band started by Steve "Eddie" Rice in 1981. They continued to play the San Francisco Bay Area from 1981 to 1990. They released five albums and one EP. They appeared on the Lost Boys soundtrack with their song, "Power Play".

Eddie & the Tide (originally named "The Suburbs" until forced to change their name by court order) played frequently during the early 1980s in the Santa Cruz and San Francisco Bay Area at venues such as the Monterey Music Hall in Monterey, The Keystone in Palo Alto, The Keystone (aka The Stone) in San Francisco, and The Catalyst in Santa Cruz and built a loyal following. Eventually signed by Bobby Corona who owned the Keystone night clubs, they released the independent EP "Maybe I'll Get Lucky" in 1982 which went on to be the biggest selling indie release to date in California.

In 1984, they independently released their first full-length album I Do It For You, with the track "Running Wild, Running Free" receiving a music video which was aired on the MTV Basement Tapes in 1983. They were awarded a Bay Area Music Award, known locally as the Bammies, for Best Debut Album in 1985 for the album. They were also awarded a Bammie as the Bay Area's Best Club Band in 1985 and 1986.

They were signed by Atco/Atlantic Records and released two albums Go Out and Get It and Looking for Adventure in 1985 and 1987, respectively. A single from Go Out and Get It, "One In a Million", peaked at No. 85 on the Billboard Hot 100 and No. 22 on the rock charts. The single was accompanied by a music video.

Their songs were used in two movies. "Runnin' Wild, Runnin' Free" was used in the 1984 movie Grandview, U.S.A., starring Jamie Lee Curtis. "Power Play" was used in the 1987 film The Lost Boys.

Failing to reach the popularity expected, they were subsequently dropped from their label. They returned to the studio and released Dig Down Deep independently in 1988 followed by Stand Tall in 1989. They also flirted with a name change to "The Tide" around this time. Eventually, they withdrew from the music scene and moved on with their personal lives.

Steve "Eddie" Rice has released two solo albums since then. One in 2000 titled It All Comes Down To Love and one in 2009 titled My Days In The Desert. Also, the albums Go Out and Get It and Looking For Adventure were finally released on compact disc and available from the band website as well as all streaming services. The Eddie Rice Project released "Love Songs From Another Dimension“ in 2020 which is also available on streaming services. This released featured bandmates Scott Mason and Chris Rieger from the original band lineup.

== Discography ==
- Maybe I'll Get Lucky (EP, 1983)
- I Do It For You (1984)
- Go Out And Get It (1985)
- Looking for Adventure (1987)
- Dig Down Deep (1988)
- Stand Tall (1989)
- The Lost Boys (film soundtrack)
- I Do It For You (re-released on CD with bonus tracks)
- Stand Tall / Dig Down Deep (re-released on CD)
- Grandview, U.S.A. (film soundtrack)
