= Into the Hot (Floy Joy album) =

Studio album by Floy Joy
- Released: September 1984
- Studio: Sound Suite, Detroit
- Length: 35:39
- Label: Virgin
- Producer: Don Was

Floy Joy chronology
Into the Hot (1984)	Weak in the Presence of Beauty (1986)

Into the Hot is the debut album by the English band Floy Joy, released by Virgin in 1984 and produced by Don Was.

Into the Hot spawned three singles: "Burn Down a Rhythm", "Until You Come Back to Me" (UK No. 91) and "Operator" (UK No. 86).

== Background ==
With the departure of singer Elana Harris in 1984, Floy Joy founding members Shaun and Michael Ward continued working on material together. They admired the work of American musician and producer Don Was and were interested in working with him. They travelled to America to find the producer and, after tracking him down to a hotel in New York, played their demo tape to him. He responded favourably to the material and agreed to produce them at his studio in Detroit. After the backing tracks were recorded and the Wards returned to England, they set about looking for a new vocalist and Carroll Thompson joined the band after she was introduced to the brothers through Virgin's A&R department. Was then came to London to record Thompson's vocals.

In a 1990 interview, Shaun Ward recalled of the album, "[It] was an anthology of R&B, jazz... all the things we'd grown up listening to and absorbed. Though we liked it, we came to realize that maybe it was a bit too personal."

== Critical reception ==
Professional ratings
Review scores
Source	Rating
Calgary Herald	B+
Record Mirror	3.5/5 stars
Red Deer Advocate	3/5 stars

Upon its release, James Muretich of the Calgary Herald wrote: "This is one album title that doesn't lie. Floy Joy is the latest British act to bring together in vibrant fashion jazz, funk and rock. The result is music that seethes with passionate passages, blending a big dance beat with strong vocal harmonies." Greg Kennedy of the Red Deer Advocate commented: "A scorching jazz-funk-soul fusion is the house specialty for Floy Joy. The whole album shakes to a big beat, and tunes such as "Burn Down a Rhythm" and "Baby You Know I..." only add to the tremors. Floy Joy can rattle my speakers anytime." Mike Daly of The Age stated: "Cool, modern funk flows from Into the Hot. Although Floy Joy is British, the album was recorded in Detroit and the cross-pollination helps."

== Track listing ==
All tracks written by Michael Ward and Shaun Ward.

1. "Burn Down a Rhythm" (4:10)
2. "Baby You Know I..." (3:28)
3. "Holiday" (4:32)
4. "Until You Come Back to Me" (4:12)
5. "Operator" (3:53)
6. "East Side, West Side" (3:00)
7. "Into the Hot" (3:32)
8. "Mission" (3:04)
9. "Sebastopol" (4:26)
10. "Theme From The Age Of Reason" (1:22)

== Singles ==
- "Burn Down A Rhythm"
- "Until You Come Back to Me"
- "Operator"

== Personnel ==
Floy Joy

- Carroll Thompson – lead vocals
- Shaun Ward – bass, guitar, synthesiser, backing vocal arrangements, arranger
- Michael Ward – saxophone, flute, backing vocals, backing vocal arrangements, arranger

Additional musicians

- Don Was – keyboards, mandolin, linn drums, arranger
- Luis Resto – keyboards, melodica
- Randy Jacobs, Bruce Nazarian – guitar
- Marcus Belgrave – trumpet
- David McMurray – alto saxophone (track 8)
- Stewart Gordon – violin
- Yogi Horton – drums
- Larry Fratangelo, Kevin Tschirhart – percussion
- Harry Bowens – backing vocals, backing vocal arrangements
- Sweet Pea Atkinson, Carol Hall, Kathy Kosins, Donny Ray Mitchell, Buster Marbury, Bernita Turner – backing vocals
- Gemma Corfield – operator voice (track 5)
- Paul Riser – synthesised string and horn arrangements (tracks 4–5)

Production

- Don Was – producer, engineer
- John 'Tokes' Potoker – mixing
- Steve 'Doc Ching' King – assistant engineer
- Michael Brauer – drum engineer

Other

- David Levine – photography

== Charts ==
Album

Chart (1985)	Peak position
New Zealand Albums Chart	40

Singles

Chart (1984)	Title	Peak position
Until You Come Back to Me	UK Singles Chart	91
Operator	UK Singles Chart	86
