= Letchford =

Letchford is an English surname. Notable people with the surname include:

- Albert Letchford (1866–1905), English artist
- Chris Letchford (born 1984), American guitarist
- Maurice Letchford (1908–1965), Canadian sport wrestler
