= I Guess It Doesn't Matter =

Single by Everyday People

from the album You Wash... I'll Dry
- B-side: "Inside Your Love"
- Released: 25 June 1990
- Length: 3:38 (7" version); 4:16 (album version)
- Label: SBK Records
- Songwriters: Shaun Ward; Desi Campbell
- Producer: Stewart Levine

Everyday People singles chronology
"Headline News" (1990)	"I Guess It Doesn't Matter" (1990)	"This Kind of Woman" (1990)

"I Guess It Doesn't Matter" is a song by British band Everyday People, released in 1990 as the second single from their only studio album You Wash... I'll Dry. It was written by Shaun Ward and Desi Campbell, and produced by Stewart Levine. "I Guess It Doesn't Matter" reached No. 93 on the UK Singles Chart.

== Critical reception ==
On its release, Music & Media wrote: "Contemporary soul with an infectious beat, some inspired singing and a state-of-the-art production." Peter Kinghorn of the Evening Chronicle praised the song's "catchy medium tempo" and "excellent expressive lead vocal".

In a review of You Wash... I'll Dry', Diana Valois of The Morning Call commented: "With a lead singer like Campbell, the group has a fluid baritone who can ease into mid-range tenor for the warm tremble of "I Guess It Doesn't Matter" or the slow burn of "This Kind of Woman"." Billboard commented: "First single, "Headline News", has begun to ignite attention, though "I Guess It Doesn't Matter" could have even stronger legs."

== Formats ==
7" and cassette single
No.	Title	Length
1.	"I Guess It Doesn't Matter"	3:34
2.	"Inside Your Love"	4:25

12" and CD single
No.	Title	Length
1.	"I Guess It Doesn't Matter (The Sheffield Dub)"	7:33
2.	"I Guess It Doesn't Matter (The Snakepass Dub)"	4:13
3.	"Inside Your Love"	4:25

12" and CD single #2
No.	Title	Length
1.	"I Guess It Doesn't Matter (Louie's Mix)"	5:09
2.	"Inside Your Love"	4:25
3.	"I Guess It Doesn't Matter (Louie's Dub)"	4:58

CD single (UK release)
No.	Title	Length
1.	"I Guess It Doesn't Matter (7")"	3:38
2.	"I Guess It Doesn't Matter (The Sheffield Dub)"	7:34
3.	"Inside Your Love"	4:25
4.	"I Guess It Doesn't Matter (L.P. Version)"	4:16

== Personnel ==
Everyday People

- Desi Campbell - lead vocals
- Lloyd T. Richards - guitar
- Shaun Ward - bass, backing vocals

Production

- Stewart Levine - producer of "I Guess It Doesn't Matter", remixer on "7" Mix", "Sheffield Dub" and "Snakepass Dub"
- Daren Klein - engineer on "I Guess It Doesn't Matter", remixer on "7" Mix", "Sheffield Dub" and "Snakepass Dub"
- Everyday People - producers of "Inside Your Love"
- Louie Vega - remix and additional production on "Inside Your Love", remixer on "Louie's Mix" and "Louie's Dub"

Other

- Ellen von Unwerth - photography

== Charts ==
Chart (1990)	Peak position
German Singles Chart	34
Swiss Singles Chart	24
UK Singles Chart	93
