= Leonard Chin =

Jamaican record producer

Leonard Chin (born Leonard Anthony Chin; 1953 in Kingston, Jamaica, died August 2013 in London, United Kingdom) aka Santic, is a Jamaican reggae record producer. After first working as a car mechanic, he then trained as a photographer and worked for the Gleaner Company. In the early 1970s he began working as a singer with Charles Hannah and The Graduates, and recorded a single for Gussie Clarke, but he realized that he was better suited to production. His early productions between 1973 and 1975 included recordings by Augustus Pablo, who recorded the first single for his Santic record label (the name derived from the nickname of his friend, drummer Carlton "Santa" Davis, and "Atlantic"), "Pablo In Dub", as well as Paul Whiteman, Horace Andy (with whom he had two hits - "Problems" and "Children of Israel"), Roman Stewart, and Gregory Isaacs. Two of the tracks he produced for Pablo were included on the melodica player's debut album. Chin's recording sessions generally took place at Randy's studio, with Errol Thompson at the mixing desk, and using Pablo as an arranger or keyboard player. Chin also produced Jah Woosh's 1976 album, Chalice Blaze. A mid-1970s compilation of his productions, An Even Harder Shade of Black, was reissued by Pressure Sounds in 1995. The label released a further collection of his work, Down Santic Way, in 2005.

In 1975, he relocated to London, England, and became a prominent producer in the lovers rock genre, working with the likes of Carroll Thompson, Jean Adebambo, Trevor Walters, Donna Rhoden, and Lorna Pierre. He died in London in 2013, aged 60.

== Discography ==
Albums

- An Even Harder Shade of Black (1995, Pressure Sounds)
- Down Santic Way (2005, Pressure Sounds)

Contributing artist

- The Rough Guide to Dub (2005, World Music Network)
