= Until You Come Back to Me (Floy Joy song) =

Single by Floy Joy

from the album Into the Hot
- B-side: "Theme from the Age of Reason"
- Released: October 1984
- Length: 4:12
- Label: Virgin
- Songwriters: Shaun Ward; Michael Ward
- Producer: Don Was

Floy Joy singles chronology
"Burn Down a Rhythm" (1984)	"Until You Come Back to Me" (1984)	"Operator" (1985)

"Until You Come Back to Me" is a song by British group Floy Joy, which was released in 1984 as the second single from their debut studio album Into the Hot. The song was written by Shaun Ward and Michael Ward, and produced by Don Was. "Until You Come Back to Me" peaked at No. 91 in the UK Singles Chart.

"Until You Come Back to Me" originated with Michael Ward and was the first tune he ever wrote.

== Critical reception ==
On its release, Dylan Jones Uppers of Record Mirror selected the "torch-like ballad" as "single of the week" and wrote, "These sweet and sulty chatterbox hazy rhythms should place the Floy Joys on the chart-mart in next to no time." Richard Cook of New Musical Express commented, "This is a beautiful piece of work, exactly the kind of tender, dignified soul groove Sade wanted to hit on 'Why Can't We Live Together'." He added, "Carroll Thompson sings this plea for supplication with a deceptive ease of a proper singer with a song to work on, embroidered by saxophones that bleed lyrical heartache and an underlie of rhythm which allows no chance for the tune to idle at any stopover."

Paul Massey of the Aberdeen Evening Express wrote, "Easily the best track on Into the Hot, and richly deserving of a chart place. Thompson has a soulful voice that just burns with energy. Tremendous." Paul Benbow of the Reading Evening Post considered the song to be an "average ballad from the blue-eyed soul outfit who I know can do better".

== Track listing ==
- 7" single
1. "Until You Come Back to Me" - 4:12
2. "Theme from the Age of Reason" - 1:22
- 12" single
1. "Until You Come Back to Me" - 4:12
2. "Theme from the Age of Reason" - 1:22
3. "Into the Hot" - 3:32
- 12" single (UK limited edition 2x 12" vinyl pack)
1. "Until You Come Back to Me" - 4:12
2. "Theme from the Age of Reason" - 1:22
3. "Into the Hot" - 3:32
4. "Into the Hot (Club Mix)"
5. "When the Flies Can't Stand the Heat" - 4:32
- 12" single (UK promo)
1. "Until You Come Back to Me" - 4:12
2. "Into the Hot (Club Mix)"
3. "Into the Hot (Instrumental)"

== Personnel ==
Production

- Don Was – producer, engineer
- John 'Tokes' Potoker – mixing on "Until You Come Back to Me"
- Michael Bigwood – mixing on "Theme from the Age of Reason"

Other

- C-More-Tone Studios – sleeve

== Charts ==
Chart (1984)	Peak position
UK Singles (OCC)	91

== Adeva version ==
"Until You Come Back to Me"

Single by Adeva

from the album Love & Lust
- B-side: "You've Got the Best (Of My Love)"
- Released: 1992
- Genre: Dance; house
- Length: 4:19
- Label: Cooltempo
- Songwriters: Shaun Ward; Michael Ward
- Producer: Smack

Adeva singles chronology
"It Should Have Been Me" (1991)	"Until You Come Back to Me" (1992)	"I'm the One for You" (1992)

Music video
- "Until You Come Back to Me" on YouTube

In 1991, American singer Adeva covered the song for her second studio album, Love or Lust (1991). In 1992, it was released by Cooltempo Records as a single in the UK and Europe. Adeva's version peaked at number 45 on the UK Singles Chart and numbers 19 and 16 on the UK Dance Singles chart and the UK Club Chart. A music video was created to promote the single.

=== Track listing ===
- 7-inch vinyl, UK (1992)

A. "Until You Come Back to Me" — 4:17
AA. "You've Got the Best (Of My Love)" (Frankie Foncett Club Mix) — 3:48

- 12-inch vinyl, UK (1992)

A1. "Until You Come Back to Me" — 6:35
A2. "Until You Come Back to Me" (Lovers Overture) — 4:12
AA1. "You've Got the Best Of My Love" (Frankie Foncett Club Mix) — 6:27
AA2. "Musical Freedom" (with Paul Simpson) — 6:21

- CD single, UK (1992)
1. "Until You Come Back to Me" (7" Version) — 4:19
2. "Until You Come Back to Me" (12" Version) — 6:38
3. "You've Got the Best (Of My Love)" (Frankie Foncett Club Mix) — 6:27
4. "Until You Come Back to Me" (Lovers Overture) — 4:15

=== Charts ===
Chart (1992)	Peak position
UK Singles (OCC)	45
UK Dance (Music Week)	19
UK Club Chart (Music Week)	16
