= Headline News (Everyday People song) =

1990 debut single by Everyday People

Single by Everyday People

from the album You Wash... I'll Dry
- B-side: "Keep Away from Love"
- Released: 12 March 1990
- Length: 4:01 (single version); 5:00 (album version); 7:07 (extended version)
- Label: SBK Records
- Songwriters: Shaun Ward; Desi Campbell
- Producer: Stewart Levine

Everyday People singles chronology
"Headline News" (1990)	"I Guess It Doesn't Matter" (1990)

"Headline News" is a song by British band Everyday People, which was released in 1990 as the lead single from their only studio album You Wash... I'll Dry. It was written by Shaun Ward and Desi Campbell, and produced by Stewart Levine. "Headline News" reached No. 99 on the UK Singles Chart.

== Critical reception ==
Upon its release, Chris Wells of New Musical Express wrote: "See for once here we are dealing with a trio of musicians whose main concern [is] how well they can write, perform and record a song based purely on musical talent. That's why 'Headline News' sounds as refreshingly organic as it does." Lisa Tilston of Record Mirror wrote, "This sounds a little like a hot, groovy George Michael, which isn't meant as an insult. It's that rare thing these days, a soul record that doesn't sound like it has to try too hard. It's also a record you can bop to without a housey beat. But then the singer and bassist are from the late, great pop/funk band Floy Joy, so it's not really surprising."

In the US, Billboard listed the single under their "new and noteworthy" section and described the song as "an uplifting and sophisticated midtempo R&B/pop jam glimmering with subtle vintage Motown nuances." In a review of You Wash... I'll Dry', CD Review wrote: "Songs like "Headline News" fuse a strong, bouncing beat, a beboppin' brass/sax backup section and triadic vocal harmonizing (characteristic of the 1960s Motown sound) with syncopated polyrhythms and a prominent, jerky bass line (popularized in 1970s funk)." Scott Benarde of The Palm Beach Post described the song as "snappy" and "crackling".

== Formats ==
7" single
No.	Title	Length
1.	"Headline News"	4:01
2.	"Keep Away from Love"	3:19

12" single
No.	Title	Length
1.	"Headline News (12" Version)"	7:07
2.	"Headline News (Accapella)"	4:57
3.	"Keep Away from Love"	3:19

CD single
No.	Title	Length
1.	"Headline News (7" Version)"	4:05
2.	"Headline News (12" Version)"	7:07
3.	"Headline News (Dub)"	4:54
4.	"Keep Away from Love"	3:19

CD single (US promo)
No.	Title	Length
1.	"Headline News (Single Edit)"	3:56
2.	"Headline News (7" Version)"	4:01
3.	"Headline News (12" Version)"	7:07
4.	"Headline News (Album Version)"	5:00

== Personnel ==
Everyday People

- Desi Campbell - lead vocals
- Lloyd T. Richards - guitar
- Shaun Ward - bass, backing vocals

Production

- Stewart Levine - producer of "Headline News"
- Michael R. Hutchinson - remix of "Headline News"
- Everyday People - producers of "Keep Away from Love"
- Jeremy Allom - engineer on "Keep Away from Love"

Other

- Ellen von Unwerth - photography

== Charts ==
Chart performance for "Headline News"
Chart (1990)	Peak position
Australia (ARIA)	140
Dutch Singles Chart	83
German Singles Chart	53
UK Singles Chart	99
