= Carroll Thompson =

British lovers rock singer

- Born: Letchworth, Hertfordshire, England
- Genres: Lovers rock; reggae; pop; jazz
- Instruments: Vocals; piano; bass guitar
- Formerly of: Floy Joy

Carroll Thompson is a British lovers rock singer, best known as the "Queen of Lovers Rock"

== Biography ==
Thompson was born in England and is of Jamaican descent.

Thompson undertook classical piano training on the piano and sang in school and church choirs as a girl, but initially studied for a career in pharmacy. She began working as a backing singer at several recording studios after auditioning for Frank Farian's Sugar Cane group.

Eventually, Thompson embarked on a solo career, with early successes in the shape of lovers rock singles "I'm So Sorry" (produced by the now London-based Leonard Chin) and "Simply in Love" both self-written topping the reggae chart in 1981, the same year seeing the release of her independent debut album Hopelessly in Love selling over a million copies worldwide. She won two GLR Reggae Awards in 1982, for Best Female Performer and Best Song (for "Hopelessly In Love"). In 1983, she won further awards, again winning Best Female Performer at the GLR awards. She also recorded duets with Sugar Minott ("Make It with You") and Trevor Walters ("Love Won't Let Us Wait"), as well as continuing with regular solo reggae chart hits.

Thompson opted to join the Sheffield-based jazz-funk aggregation Floy Joy in 1984 where she featured on one album and scored two minor hits with the soul ballad "Until You Come Back to Me" (#91 UK pop) and "Operator" (#86 UK pop). In 1987, she duetted with Aztec Camera's Roddy Frame on the song "One and One" from the album Love.

Following Floy Joy, her releases dwindled reviving in 1990 when she provided lead vocals on a version of Diana Ross's "I'm Still Waiting", recorded with Aswad and Courtney Pine, which was a UK Singles Chart hit. She also enjoyed chart hits that year with Movement 98's "Joy & Heartbreak" and "Sunrise". In 1992, her "Let the Music Play" was included on the Oscar/Grammy nominated and BAFTA winner soundtrack to the film The Crying Game, and in 1993, she worked with Neil "Mad Professor" Fraser on the album The Other Side of Love.

In 2018, Thompson recorded an album of Phyllis Dillon songs as a tribute to the late singer, set for release in 2019.

Thompson has worked as a session singer with Michael Jackson, Stevie Wonder, Natalie Cole, Pet Shop Boys, Robbie Williams, Boy George, Maxi Priest, Sting, Billy Ocean, Chaka Khan, Aswad and M People. She is also the co-founder (with Adebayo) of Colourtelly, Britain's first black interest internet TV station.

== Personal life ==
Carroll is married to BBC Radio 5 Live presenter Dotun Adebayo.

== Discography ==
=== Albums ===
- Hopelessly in Love (1981) Carib Gems (UK Indie Albums #22)
- Carroll Thompson (1983) Carousel
- The Other Side of Love (1993) Ariwa
- Full Circle (1995)
- Songbird (1996)
- Collectively (1998) Boot Street
- The Ultimate Collection
- Love Songs Victor
- Flying (2008) Victor
- Feels So Good (2011), Heritage

=== Singles ===
- "Just a Little Bit" (1982)
- "Smiling in the Morning" (1982)
- "Make It with You" (Carroll Thompson and Sugar Minott, 1983)
- "Strangest Love Affair" (1986) (UK #121)
- "Love Without Passion" (1987)
- "Joy and Heartbreak" (Movement 98 featuring Carroll Thompson, 1990) (UK #27)
- "I'm Still Waiting" (Courtney Pine featuring Carroll Thompson, 1990) (UK #66)
- "Sunrise" (Movement 98 featuring Carroll Thompson, 1990) (UK #58)
