= List of awards and nominations received by Bette Midler =

Awards and nominations of Bette Midler

Bette Midler awards and nominations
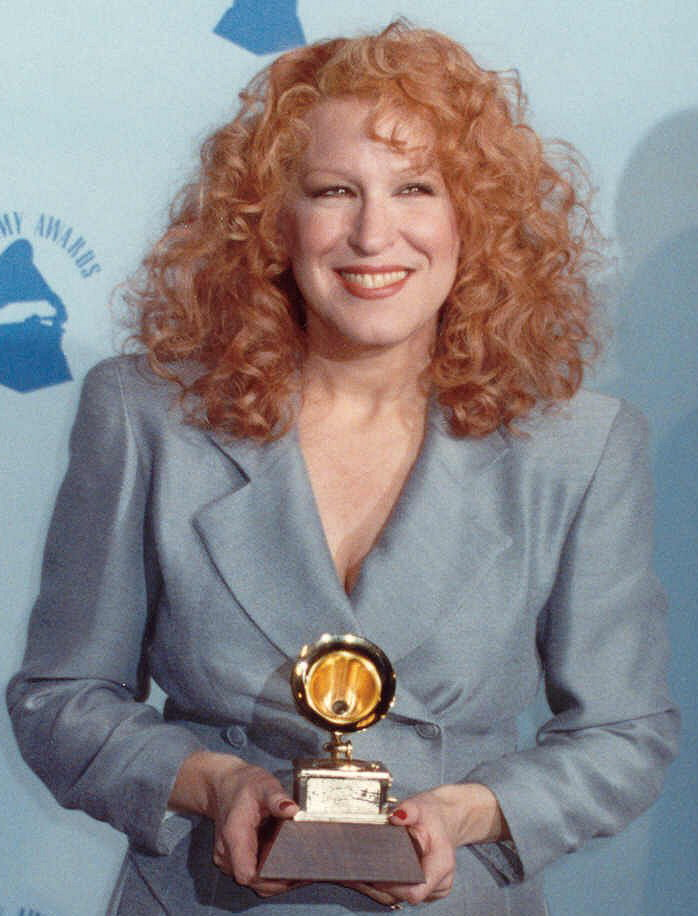
- Midler on February 21, 1990, after winning at the 32nd Grammy Awards for Record of the Year for "Wind Beneath My Wings"
Awards and nominations
Award	Wins	Nominations
Academy Awards	0	2
British Academy Film Awards	0	1
Drama Desk Awards	1	3
Golden Globe Awards	4	8
Grammy Awards	3	15
People's Choice Awards	2	6
Primetime Emmy Awards	3	9
Satellite Awards	0	1
Tony Awards	1	1

Totals (Note: Certain award groups do not simply award one winner. They acknowledge several different recipients, have runners-up, and have third place. Since this is a specific recognition and is different from losing an award, runner-up mentions are considered wins in this award tally. For simplification and to avoid errors, each award in this list has been presumed to have had a prior nomination.)
- Wins: 33
- Nominations: 92

American singer, songwriter, actress, author, and comedian Bette Midler has received many awards and nominations for her work on screen, on stage, and in the studio.

During her musical career, Midler has received fifteen Grammy Award nominations. In her first year she won Best New Artist. In 1981, she won Best Female Pop Vocal Performance for "The Rose", and in 1990, the song "Wind Beneath My Wings" was recognized as Record of the Year.

For her work in film, Midler was twice nominated for the Academy Award for Best Actress, for her performances in the drama The Rose (1979) and the musical comedy-drama For the Boys (1991), both of which won her a Golden Globe Award in the same category. Moving to television, Midler received Emmy nominations for her roles in Bette Midler: Ol' Red Hair is Back (1978), The Tonight Show Starring Johnny Carson (1992), television film Gypsy (1993), Bette Midler in Concert: Diva Las Vegas (1998), comedy series Murphy Brown (1998), Bette Midler: The Showgirl Must Go On (2011), and The Politician (2020), of which she won three.

Midler has also achieved success on stage, winning a 1974 Special Tony Award and a 2017 Tony Award for Best Actress in a Musical for her role in a Broadway production of Hello, Dolly! In addition, Midler has held several concert tours, with Diva Las Vegas winning her a Primetime Emmy Award for Outstanding Individual Performance in a Variety or Music Program in 1998.

In 1985, Midler was awarded a star on the Hollywood Walk of Fame. In 2021, she received the Kennedy Center Honors Medal.

== Major awards ==
=== Academy Awards ===
Year	Category	Nominated work	Result	Ref.
1979	Best Actress	The Rose	Nominated	
1991	Best Actress	For the Boys	Nominated	

=== BAFTA Awards ===
Year	Category	Nominated work	Result	Ref.
1981	Best Actress in a Leading Role	The Rose	Nominated	

=== Drama Desk Awards ===
Year	Category	Nominated work	Result	Ref.
2011	Outstanding Musical (for producing)	Priscilla Queen of the Desert	Nominated	
2013	Outstanding Solo Performance	I'll Eat You Last: A Chat With Sue Mengers	Nominated	
2017	Outstanding Actress in a Musical	Hello, Dolly!	Won	

=== Golden Globe Awards ===
Year	Category	Nominated work	Result	Ref.
1980	New Star of the Year in a Motion Picture – Female	The Rose	Won	
1980	Best Actress in a Motion Picture — Comedy or Musical	The Rose	Won	
1981	Best Actress in a Motion Picture — Comedy or Musical	Divine Madness	Nominated	
1987	Best Actress in a Motion Picture — Comedy or Musical	Down and Out in Beverly Hills	Nominated	
1988	Best Actress in a Motion Picture — Comedy or Musical	Outrageous Fortune	Nominated	
1992	Best Actress in a Motion Picture — Comedy or Musical	For the Boys	Won	
1994	Best Actress in a Miniseries or Motion Picture Made for Television	Gypsy	Won	
2001	Best Actress in a Television Series — Comedy or Musical	Bette	Nominated	

=== Grammy Awards ===
Year	Category	Nominated work	Result	Ref.
1974	Best New Artist		Won	
1974	Album of the Year	The Divine Miss M	Nominated	
1974	Best Female Pop Vocal Performance	"Boogie Woogie Bugle Boy"	Nominated	
1981	Record of the Year	"The Rose"	Nominated	
1981	Best Female Pop Vocal Performance	"The Rose"	Won	
1987	Best Comedy Recording	Mud Will Be Flung Tonight	Nominated	
1990	Best Recording for Children	Oliver and Company OST	Nominated	
1990	Record of the Year	"Wind Beneath My Wings"	Won	
1990	Best Female Pop Vocal Performance	"Wind Beneath My Wings"	Nominated	
1991	Record of the Year	"From a Distance"	Nominated	
1991	Best Female Pop Vocal Performance	"From a Distance"	Nominated	
2004	Best Traditional Pop Vocal Album	Bette Midler Sings the Rosemary Clooney Songbook	Nominated	
2007	Best Traditional Pop Vocal Album	Bette Midler Sings the Peggy Lee Songbok	Nominated	
2008	Best Traditional Pop Vocal Album	Cool Yule	Nominated	
2018	Best Musical Theatre Album	Hello, Dolly!	Nominated	

=== Primetime Emmy Awards ===
Year	Category	Nominated work	Result	Ref.
1978	Outstanding Special – Comedy-Variety or Music	Bette Midler: Ol' Red Hair is Back	Won	
1978	Outstanding Writing in a Comedy-Variety or Music Special	Bette Midler: Ol' Red Hair is Back	Nominated	
1992	Outstanding Individual Performance in a Variety or Music Program	The Tonight Show Starring Johnny Carson	Won	
1994	Outstanding Lead Actress in a Miniseries or a Special	Gypsy	Nominated	
1997	Outstanding Variety, Music or Comedy Special	Bette Midler in Concert: Diva Las Vegas	Nominated	
1997	Outstanding Performance in a Variety or Music Program	Bette Midler in Concert: Diva Las Vegas	Won	
1998	Outstanding Guest Actress in a Comedy Series	Murphy Brown	Nominated	
2011	Outstanding Variety, Music or Comedy Special	Bette Midler: The Showgirl Must Go On	Nominated	
2020	Outstanding Guest Actress in a Comedy Series	The Politician	Nominated	

=== Satellite Awards ===
Year	Category	Nominated work	Result	Ref.
1997	Best Actress in a Motion Picture — Comedy or Musical	The First Wives Club	Nominated	

=== Tony Awards ===
Year	Category	Nominated work	Result	Ref.
1974	Special Award		Won	
2017	Best Actress in a Musical	Hello, Dolly!	Won	

== Other awards ==
Award	Year	Category	Nominated work	Result	Ref.
AARP Movies for Grownups Awards	2009	Best Supporting Actress	Then She Found Me	Nominated	
American Cinematheque Gala Tribute	1987	American Cinematheque Award		Won	
American Comedy Awards	1987	Funniest Female Performer of the Year		Won	
American Comedy Awards	1987	Lifetime Achievement Award in Comedy		Won	
American Comedy Awards	1987	Funniest Actress in a Motion Picture	Ruthless People	Won	
American Comedy Awards	1988	Funniest Actress in a Motion Picture	Outrageous Fortune	Won	
American Comedy Awards	1989	Funniest Actress in a Motion Picture	Big Business	Won	
American Comedy Awards	1990	Funniest Actress in a Motion Picture	Beaches	Nominated	
American Comedy Awards	1993	Funniest Female Performer in a Television Special	The Tonight Show Starring Johnny Carson	Won	
American Comedy Awards	1996	Funniest Supporting Actress in a Motion Picture	Get Shorty	Won	
American Comedy Awards	1997	Funniest Actress in a Motion Picture	The First Wives Club	Nominated	
American Comedy Awards	1998	Funniest Female Performer in a Television Special	Bette Middler in Concert: Diva Las Vegas	Won	
Billboard Number One Awards (Note: Prior to the inauguration of the Billboard Music Awards in 1990, the magazine had the "Number One Awards" to honor the top-performing artists of the year on each of chart categories.)	1973	Top Singles Artists		21st place	
Billboard Number One Awards	1973	Top Album Artists		34th place	
Billboard Number One Awards	1973	Top Singles Female Vocalists		3rd place	
Billboard Number One Awards	1973	Top Singles New Artists		4th place	
Billboard Number One Awards	1973	Top Singles Easy Listening Artists		7th place	
Billboard Number One Awards	1973	Top Pop Singles	"Boogie Woogie Bugle Boy"	71st place	
Billboard Number One Awards	1973	Top Pop Singles	"Do You Want to Dance?"	76th place	
Billboard Number One Awards	1973	Top Easy Listening Singles	"Boogie Woogie Bugle Boy"	7th place	
Billboard Number One Awards	1973	Top Album Female Artists		5th place	
Billboard Number One Awards	1973	Top New Album Artists		4th place	
Billboard Number One Awards	1973	Honor Roll of New Hot 100 Artists		4th place	
Billboard Number One Awards	1973	Honor Roll of New Album Artists		6th place	
Billboard Number One Awards	1974	Top Pop Singles – Female Vocalists		17th place	
Billboard Number One Awards	1974	Top Pop Albums	Bette Midler	87th place	
Billboard Number One Awards	1974	Top Pop Singles – Female Artists		4th place	
Billboard Number One Awards	1977	Easy Listening Singles Artists		46th place	
Billboard Number One Awards	1977	Easy Listening Singles	"You're Moving Out Today"	46th place	
Billboard Number One Awards	1978	Pop Female Artists		26th place	
Billboard Number One Awards	1978	Pop Female Singles Artists		23th place	
Billboard Number One Awards	1978	Pop Female Albums Artists		24th place	
Billboard Number One Awards	1978	Box Office – Auditoriums		8th place	
Billboard Number One Awards	1979	Top Overall Female Artists		49th place	
Billboard Number One Awards	1980	Pop Female Artists		11th place	
Billboard Number One Awards	1980	Pop Singles	"The Rose"	10th place	
Billboard Number One Awards	1980	Pop Single Artists		34th place	
Billboard Number One Awards	1980	Pop Female Single Artists		6th place	
Billboard Number One Awards	1980	Adult Contemporary Singles	"The Rose"	3rd place	
Billboard Number One Awards	1980	Adult Contemporary Artists		15th place	
Billboard Number One Awards	1981	Pop Female Artists		29th place	
Billboard Number One Awards	1981	Pop Female Single Artists		22nd place	
Billboard Number One Awards	1989	Top Pop Singles Artists		37th place	
Billboard Number One Awards	1989	Top Pop Singles Artists – Female		13th place	
Billboard Number One Awards	1989	Top Adult Contemporary Artists		16th place	
Billboard Number One Awards	1989	Top Adult Contemporary Singles	"Wind Beneath My Wings"	4th place	
Billboard Number One Awards	1990	Top Pop Singles Artists – Female		21st place	
Billboard Number One Awards	1991	Top Album Artists		20th place	
Billboard Number One Awards	1991	Top Pop Singles	"From a Distance"	15th place	
Billboard Number One Awards	1991	Top Pop Singles Artists		34th place	
Billboard Number One Awards	1991	Top Pop Album Artists – Female		6th place	
Billboard Number One Awards	1991	Top Pop Singles Artists – Female		10th place	
Billboard Number One Awards	1991	Top Adult Contemporary Singles	"From a Distance"	25th place	
Billboard Number One Awards	1991	Top Adult Contemporary Artists		12th place	
Billboard Number One Awards	1992	Top Billboard 200 Album Artists		77th place	
Billboard Number One Awards	1992	Top Billboard 200 Album Artists – Female		15th place	
Billboard Number One Awards	1993	Top Billboard 200 Album Artists – Female		23rd place	
Billboard Number One Awards	1996	Hot Dance Music Club Play Singles	"To Deserve You"	45th place	
Billboard Number One Awards	1999	Hot Dance Club-Play Artists		20th place	
Billboard Number One Awards	1999	Hot Dance Club-Play Singles	"I'm Beautiful"	8th place	
Billboard Number One Awards	1999	Hot Dance Maxi-Singles Sales	"I'm Beautiful"	43th place	
British LGBT Awards	2016	Global Icon		Nominated	
CableACE Awards	1985	Performance in a Musical Special	Bette Midler: Art or Bust	Nominated	
CableACE Awards	1989	Entertainment Host	The Mondo Beyondo Show	Nominated	
Cash Box Awards	1973	New Female – Singles		1st place	
Cash Box Awards	1973	New Female – Albums		1st place	
Cash Box Awards	1974	Female – Singles		12th place	
Cash Box Awards	1974	Female – Albums		6th place	
Cash Box Awards	1979	Special Decade Awards – Female		Won	
Cash Box Awards	1980	Top Female Vocalist – Singles		2nd place	
Cash Box Awards	1989	Top A/C Female – Singles		1st place	
Chicago Film Critics Association Awards	1992	Best Actress	For the Boys	Nominated	
Costume Designers Guild Awards	2023	Distinguished Collaborator Award		Won	
Disney Legend	2019	Honored as a Disney Legend by The Walt Disney Company		Inducted	
Golden Apple Awards	1996	Female Star of the Year	The First Wives Club	Won	
Gold Derby Awards	2020	Comedy Guest Actress	The Politician	Nominated	
Golden Raspberry Awards	1991	Worst Actress	Stella	Nominated	
Golden Raspberry Awards	2001	Worst Actress	Isn't She Great	Nominated	
Hasty Pudding Theatricals	1976	Woman of the Year		Won	
Hollywood Walk of Fame	1985	Star on Hollywood Walk of Fame		Inducted	
Kennedy Center Honors	2021	Kennedy Center Honors Medal		Inducted	
Kid's Choice Awards	1989	Favorite Movie Actress	Beaches	Nominated	
MTV Video Music Awards	1984	Best Stage Performance in a Video	Bette Midler: Beast of Burden	Nominated	
MTV Video Music Awards	1984	Best Female Video	Bette Midler: Beast of Burden	Nominated	
National Board of Review Awards	1996	Best Acting by an Ensemble	The First Wives Club	Won	
National Society of Film Critics Awards	1980	Best Actress	The Rose	Nominated	
New York Film Critics Circle Awards	1979	Best Actress	The Rose	Nominated	
Online Film & Television Association	1997	Best Adapted Song for "You Don't Own Me"	The First Wives Club	Nominated	
Online Film & Television Association	2001	Best Actress in a New Comedy Series	Bette	Nominated	
Online Film & Television Association	2020	Best Guest Actress in a Comedy Series	The Politician	Nominated	
People's Choice Awards	1980	Favorite Motion Picture Actor	The Rose	Nominated	
People's Choice Awards	1981	Favorite Motion Picture Actress	Divine Madness!	Nominated	
People's Choice Awards	1987	Favorite All-Around Female Entertainer		Nominated	
People's Choice Awards	1988	Favorite All-Around Female Entertainer		Nominated	
People's Choice Awards	1989	Favorite Comedy Motion Picture Actress	Beaches	Won	
People's Choice Awards	2001	Favorite Female Performer in a New TV Series	Bette	Won	
Photoplay Awards	1975	Variety Star		Nominated	
Photoplay Awards	1977	Favorite Female Sex Symbol		Nominated	
Photoplay Awards	1978	Favorite Female Sex Symbol		Nominated	
Photoplay Awards	1978	Favorite Pop Music Star		Nominated	
Photoplay Awards	1979	Favorite Variety Star		Nominated	
Record World Awards	1973	Top Female Vocalists – Singles		3rd place	
Record World Awards	1973	Top Female Vocalists – Albums		1st place	
Record World Awards	1980	Top New Female Vocalists – Singles		6th place	
Record World Awards	1980	Top New Female Vocalists – Albums		6th place	
Record World Awards	1980	Most Promising Female Vocalist		1st place	
Record World Awards	1980	Top Female Vocalists – A/C		4th place	
Saturn Awards	1994	Best Actress	Hocus Pocus	Nominated	
ShoWest Convention	1988	Female Star of the Year		Won	
The Stinkers Bad Movie Awards	1997	Worst Actress	That Old Feeling	Nominated	
The Stinkers Bad Movie Awards	1997	Worst On-Screen Couple	That Old Feeling	Won	
The Stinkers Bad Movie Awards	2000	Worst Actress	Isn't She Great	Nominated	
TV Guide Awards	2001	Actress of the Year in a New Series	Bette	Won	
TV Guide Awards	2001	Actress of the Year in a Comedy Series	Bette	Nominated	
Women in Film Crystal + Lucy Awards	1985	Jack Oakie Comedy Award		Won	
Women in Film Crystal + Lucy Awards	1997	Crystal Award		Won	

== Bibliography ==
- "Talent in Action" (PDF). Billboard. Vol. 85, no. 52. New York: Billboard Publications Inc. December 29, 1973. ISSN 0006-2510.
- "Talent in Action" (PDF). Billboard. Vol. 86, no. 52. New York: Billboard Publications Inc. December 28, 1974. ISSN 0006-2510.
- "Talent in Action" (PDF). Billboard. Vol. 90, no. 51. New York: Billboard Publications Inc. December 23, 1978. ISSN 0006-2510.
- Grein, Paul (December 23, 1978). "Billboard's 1980 Talent in Action" (PDF). Billboard. Vol. 92, no. 51. New York: Billboard Publications Inc. ISSN 0006-2510.
- Grein, Paul (December 26, 1981). "The Year End Charts" (PDF). Billboard. Vol. 93, no. 52. New York: Billboard Publications Inc. ISSN 0006-2510.
- "1989 – The Year in Music" (PDF). Billboard. Vol. 101, no. 51. New York: Billboard Publications Inc. December 23, 1989. ISSN 0006-2510.
- "1991 – The Year in Music" (PDF). Billboard. Vol. 103, no. 51. New York: Billboard Publications Inc. December 21, 1991. ISSN 0006-2510.
- Terry, Ken (December 26, 1992). "1992 – The Year in Business" (PDF). Billboard. Vol. 104, no. 52. New York: Billboard Publications Inc. ISSN 0006-2510.
- "Best Artists of 1973" (PDF). Cash Box. Vol. XXXV, no. 33. New York: The Cash Box Publishing Co. Inc. December 29, 1973. ISSN 0008-7289.
- "Best Artists of 1974" (PDF). Cash Box. Vol. XXXVI, no. 31. New York: The Cash Box Publishing Co. Inc. December 28, 1974. ISSN 0008-7289.
- "Record World Year-End Awards" (PDF). Record World. Vol. 29, no. 1384. New York: Record World Pub. Co. December 29, 1973. ISSN 0034-1622.
- "1980 Year-End Awards" (PDF). Record World. Vol. 37, no. 1744. New York: Record World Pub. Co. December 27, 1980. ISSN 0034-1622.
