= Stella Dallas =

Stella Dallas can refer to:

- Stella Dallas (novel), a 1920 novel by Olive Higgins Prouty
- Stella Dallas (1925 film), a silent film adaptation of the novel featuring Ronald Colman and Belle Bennett
- Stella Dallas (1937 film), an adaptation of the novel starring Barbara Stanwyck and John Boles
- Stella Dallas (radio series), a 1937–1955 adaptation of the novel

== See also ==
- Stella (1990 film), a 1990 film adaptation of the novel
