= Kiss My Brass =

2003–05 concert tour by Bette Midler

- Tour by Bette Midler
- Promotional poster for the tour
- Location: North America; Australia
- Start date: 10 December 2003
- End date: 1 May 2005
- Legs: 3
- No. of shows: 77

Bette Midler concert chronology
- The Divine Miss Millennium Tour (1999–2000); Kiss My Brass (2003–05); The Showgirl Must Go On (2008)

Bette Midler hit the road for the first time in four years with her 2003–05 Kiss My Brass concert tour. The first leg of the tour kicked off on December 10 in Chicago and went through the middle of February. The tour hit the top 40 cities across the U.S. with one stop in Toronto, Ontario, Canada. The first leg of the tour ended in Atlantic City, New Jersey and the second leg of the tour began in Manchester, New Hampshire and ended in Minneapolis, Minnesota.

10 Australian dates were added in April and May 2005. It was the first Australian tour for Midler in 26 years.

On the tour, she performed well-known hits and characters, as well as selected songs from her release, Bette Midler Sings the Rosemary Clooney Songbook.

== Setlist ==
1. "Kiss My Brass" / "Big Noise from Winnetka"
2. "Stuff Like That There"
3. "Skylark"
4. "Boogie Woogie Bugle Boy"
5. "Judge Judy" (Sketch Intermission)
6. "I'm Sorry"
7. "Nobody Else But You"
8. "Friends"
9. "Tenderly"
10. "Chapel of Love"
11. "That's How Heartaches are Made"
12. "I Think It's Going to Rain Today"
13. "When a Man Loves a Woman"
14. "Walk Right In"
15. "Those Wonderful Sophie Tucker Jokes"
16. "Shiver Me Timbers"
17. "Delores Delago: Fishtails Over Broadway" (Sketch Intermission)
18. "I Had a Dream"
19. "Everything's Coming Up Roses"
20. "Tonight"
21. "Cabaret"
22. "You'll Never Walk Alone"
23. "Tomorrow"
24. "And I Am Telling You I'm Not Going"
25. "All That Jazz"
26. "One"
27. "Hello, Dolly!"
28. "Give My Regards to Broadway"
29. "Oklahoma"
30. "I Like to Be Told" / "September"
31. "From A Distance"
32. "Do You Wanna Dance"
33. "Wind Beneath My Wings"
34. "Keep On Rockin'"
35. "The Rose"
36. "Friends"
37. "White Christmas"

== Tour dates ==
Date	City	Country	Venue
First leg
December 10, 2003	Chicago	United States	United Center
December 13, 2003	Columbus	United States	Nationwide Arena
December 15, 2003	St. Louis	United States	Savvis Center
December 17, 2003	Milwaukee	United States	Bradley Center
December 19, 2003	Saint Paul	United States	Xcel Energy Center
December 27, 2003	Wilkes-Barre	United States	Wachovia Arena
December 29, 2003	Hershey	United States	Giant Center
December 31, 2003	Uncasville	United States	Mohegan Sun
January 1, 2004	Uncasville	United States	Mohegan Sun
January 3, 2004	Uniondale	United States	Nassau Coliseum
January 5, 2004	Cleveland	United States	Gund Arena
January 8, 2004	Pittsburgh	United States	Mellon Arena
January 10, 2004	Auburn Hills	United States	The Palace of Auburn Hills
January 12, 2004	Toronto	Canada	Air Canada Centre
January 15, 2004	Philadelphia	United States	Wachovia Center
January 17, 2004	New York City	United States	Madison Square Garden
January 18, 2004	New York City	United States	Madison Square Garden
January 20, 2004	Boston	United States	Fleet Center
January 23, 2004	Washington, D.C.	United States	MCI Center
January 25, 2004	Atlanta	United States	Philips Arena
January 29, 2004	Dallas	United States	American Airlines Center
January 31, 2004	Denver	United States	Pepsi Center
February 3, 2004	Seattle	United States	KeyArena
February 4, 2004	Portland	United States	Rose Garden
February 7, 2004	San Jose	United States	HP Pavilion at San Jose
February 10, 2004	Oakland	United States	Oakland Coliseum
February 12, 2004	Phoenix	United States	Glendale Arena
February 14, 2004	Las Vegas	United States	MGM Grand Garden Arena
February 15, 2004	Las Vegas	United States	MGM Grand Garden Arena
February 18, 2004	San Diego	United States	San Diego Sports Arena
February 20, 2004	Reno	United States	Lawlor Events Center
February 22, 2004	Anaheim	United States	Arrowhead Pond
February 24, 2004	Los Angeles	United States	Staples Center
February 28, 2004	Sunrise	United States	Office Depot Center
February 29, 2004	Sunrise	United States	Office Depot Center
March 2, 2004	Tampa	United States	St. Pete Times Forum
March 4, 2004	Columbia	United States	Colonial Center
March 6, 2004	Hampton	United States	Hampton Coliseum
March 9, 2004	Buffalo	United States	HSBC Arena
March 11, 2004	Grand Rapids	United States	Van Andel Arena
March 13, 2004	East Rutherford	United States	Continental Airlines Arena
March 15, 2004	Boston	United States	Fleet Center
March 17, 2004	Albany	United States	Pepsi Arena
March 20, 2004	Atlantic City	United States	Boardwalk Hall
Second leg
September 30, 2004	Manchester	United States	Verizon Wireless Arena
October 2, 2004	Uncasville	United States	Mohegan Sun
October 5, 2004	Rochester	United States	Blue Cross Arena
October 7, 2004	Albany	United States	Pepsi Arena
October 9, 2004	Atlantic City	United States	Boardwalk Hall
October 11, 2004	Baltimore	United States	1st Mariner Arena
October 13, 2004	New York City	United States	Radio City Music Hall
October 14, 2004	New York City	United States	Radio City Music Hall
October 16, 2004	New York City	United States	Radio City Music Hall
October 17, 2004	New York City	United States	Radio City Music Hall
October 19, 2004	Providence	United States	Dunkin' Donuts Center
October 21, 2004	Richmond	United States	Richmond Coliseum
October 28, 2004	Duluth	United States	Arena at Gwinnett Center
October 30, 2004	Miami	United States	American Airlines Arena
November 1, 2004	Raleigh	United States	RBC Center
November 3, 2004	Philadelphia	United States	Wachovia Center
November 5, 2004	Auburn Hills	United States	The Palace of Auburn Hills
November 6, 2004	Chicago	United States	United Center
November 8, 2004	Moline	United States	MARK of the Quad Cities
November 10, 2004	Omaha	United States	Qwest Center
November 12, 2004	Oklahoma City	United States	Ford Center
November 14, 2004	San Antonio	United States	SBC Center
November 16, 2004	Grand Prairie	United States	Nokia Theatre at Grand Prairie
November 19, 2004	Houston	United States	Toyota Center
November 21, 2004	New Orleans	United States	New Orleans Arena
November 26, 2004	Las Vegas	United States	MGM Grand Garden Arena
November 27, 2004	Phoenix	United States	America West Arena
November 30, 2004	Anaheim	United States	Arrowhead Pond
December 2, 2004	Sacramento	United States	ARCO Arena
December 4, 2004	San Jose	United States	HP Pavilion at San Jose
December 7, 2004	Everett	United States	Everett Events Center
December 10, 2004	Grand Forks	United States	Alerus Center
December 12, 2004	Minneapolis	United States	Target Center

Date	City	Country	Venue
Australian leg
April 8, 2005	Brisbane	Australia	Brisbane Entertainment Center
April 10, 2005	Brisbane	Australia	Brisbane Entertainment Center
April 13, 2005	Sydney	Australia	Sydney SuperDome
April 15, 2005	Sydney	Australia	Sydney SuperDome
April 18, 2005	Melbourne	Australia	Rod Laver Arena
April 21, 2005	Melbourne	Australia	Rod Laver Arena
April 23, 2005	Melbourne	Australia	Rod Laver Arena
April 26, 2005	Adelaide	Australia	Adelaide Entertainment Centre
April 30, 2005	Sydney	Australia	Sydney SuperDome
May 1, 2005	Sydney	Australia	Sydney SuperDome

=== Box office score data ===
City	Venue	Tickets sold / available	Gross revenue
St. Louis	Savvis Center	9,931/13,147 (75,5%)	$686,670
Hershey	Giant Center	8,782/8,782 (100%)	$678,570
Milwaukee	Bradley Center	9,407/13,715 (68,6%)	$568,885
Wilkes-Barre	Wachovia Arena	8,146/8,146 (100%)	$562,701
Uniondale	Nassau Veterans Memorial Coliseum	11,582/11,848 (97%)	$1,415,221
Cleveland	Gund Arena	12,420/14,723 (84%)	$1,094,990
Philadelphia	Wachovia Center	13,041/13,041 (100%)	$1,329,078
Auburn Hills	The Palace of Auburn Hills	11,964/15,064 (79%)	$1,068,172
Toronto	Air Canada Centre	12,673/15,001 (84%)	$973,333
New York City	Madison Square Garden	25,770/27,240 (95%)	$3,161,410
Boston	Fleet Center	12,396/12,396 (100%)	$1,486,476
Washington, D.C.	MCI Center	11,965/14,608 (82%)	$1,370,900
Dallas	American Airlines Center	13,147/13,147 (100%)	$991,935
Atlanta	Philips Arena	11,303/12,757 (87%)	$965,079
Seattle	KeyArena	10,519/11,297 (93%)	$996,328
Denver	Pepsi Center	9,901/12,333 (80%)	$870,309
Portland	Rose Garden	9,478/13,083 (72%)	$752,874
San Jose	HP Pavilion at San Jose	11,415/11,888 (96%)	$1,106,312
Glendale	Glendale Arena	12,494/13,101 (95%)	$987,124
Oakland	Oakland Arena	7,825/11,365 (69%)	$882,764
Las Vegas	MGM Grand Garden Arena	11,122/12,645 (88%)	$1,977,356
Reno	Lawlor Events Center	5,938/8,506 (70%)	$736,976
San Diego	San Diego Sports Arena	6,748/9,944 (68%)	$667,439
Los Angeles	Staples Center	11,728/12,771 (92%)	$1,243,892
Anaheim	Arrowhead Pond	10,092/11,551 (87%)	$1,206,920
Sunrise	Office Depot Center	20,185/31,160 (65%)	$2,050,247
Tampa	St. Pete Times Forum	9,783/12,816 (76%)	$939,902
Boston	Fleet Center	9,832/13,354 (74%)	$1,155,641
East Rutherford	Continental Airlines Arena	12,858/13,854 (93%)	$983,900
Buffalo	HSBC Arena	10,041/12,808 (78%)	$715,173
Hampton	Hampton Coliseum	8,048/8,407 (96%)	$698,180
Atlantic City	Boardwalk Hall	11,635/11,635 (100%)	$1,396,940

== Personnel ==
- Bette Midler – Lead vocals
- Bette Sussman – musical director, piano
- Irwin Fisch – Synthesizers, keyboards
- Sonny Emory – Drums
- Lenny Castro – Percussion
- Taku Hirano – Percussion
- John Harrington – Guitar
- Mike Miller – Guitar
- Zev Katz – Bass
- Sam Sims – Bass
- Kyra Da Costa – Background vocals
- Kamilah Martin – Background vocals
- Nicolette Hart – Background vocals
- Eric Wangensteen – Trumpet
- Scott Steen – Trumpet
- Andrew Lippman – Trombone
- Mando Dorame – Tenor saxophone
- Jim Jedeikin – Baritone saxophone, alto saxophone, clarinet, flute
