= Sisters (song) =

Song by Rosemary Clooney
- Published: 1954
- Composer: Irving Berlin for film White Christmas

Sisters is a popular song written by Irving Berlin in 1954, best known from the 1954 film White Christmas.

== Recordings ==
=== White Christmas ===
Trudy Stevens provided the singing voice for Vera-Ellen in "Sisters". The first edition of Vera-Ellen's biography by David Soren made the mistake of suggesting that "perhaps" Rosemary Clooney sang for Vera in "Sisters". The second edition of the biography corrected that error by adding this: "Appropriately, they sing ‘Sisters' with Rosemary Clooney actually duetting with Trudy Stabile (wife of popular bandleader Dick Stabile), who sang under the stage name Trudy Stevens and who had been personally recommended for the dubbing part by Clooney. Originally, Gloria Wood was going to do Vera-Ellen's singing until Clooney intervened on behalf of her friend."

White Christmas also starred Bing Crosby and Danny Kaye. It was not possible to issue an "original soundtrack album" of the film, because Decca Records controlled the soundtrack rights, and Clooney was under exclusive contract with Columbia Records. Consequently, each one issued a separate "soundtrack recording": Decca issued Selections from Irving Berlin's White Christmas, while Columbia issued Irving Berlin's White Christmas. On the former, the song "Sisters" (as well as all of Clooney's vocal parts) was recorded by Peggy Lee, while on the latter, the song was sung by Rosemary Clooney and her own sister, Betty. There was an unscripted moment between Crosby and Kaye on set where they were clowning around and put on some of the sisters' costumes and started lip-syncing to the sisters' song. This clip was kept in the final cut of the movie White Christmas because director Michael Curtiz liked its comedic value, which added to the movie and storyline.

== Other recordings ==
- The Clooney sisters' version, which was also released as a single, was the most popular recording of the song, charting in 1954 and peaking at #30.
- In 1954, the song was also made famous in the United Kingdom by sister act the Beverley Sisters.
- Bette Midler Sings the Rosemary Clooney Songbook, a 2003 album of songs made famous by Rosemary Clooney, done by Bette Midler, included a version of the song done by Midler and Linda Ronstadt.
- Aly & AJ Michalka recorded their version for their 2023 Holiday EP.
