= Divine Intervention Tour =

2015 concert tour by Bette Midler

- Tour by Bette Midler
- Associated album: It's the Girls!
- Start date: May 8, 2015
- End date: July 19, 2015
- Legs: 2
- No. of shows: 26 in North America; 6 in Europe; 32 in total
- Box office: $36,643,276

Bette Midler concert chronology
- The Showgirl Must Go On (2008–10); Divine Intervention Tour (2015); ...

The Divine Intervention Tour was the tenth concert tour by American singer, songwriter, actress, comedian, and film producer Bette Midler. The tour started on May 8, 2015, in Hollywood, Florida, and concluded on July 19, 2015, in London, England. The tour traveled through North America, specifically the United States and Canada, and Europe, specifically parts of England and Scotland.

This was Midler's first global tour in over a decade, and promoted her October 2014 album It is the Girls!

David Warner of Creative Loafing Tampa said of the Tampa show, "...the sass, the sashay, the big sound and the unabashed emotion were all in such top form that you couldn’t help but marvel: This woman's how old?"

== Set list ==
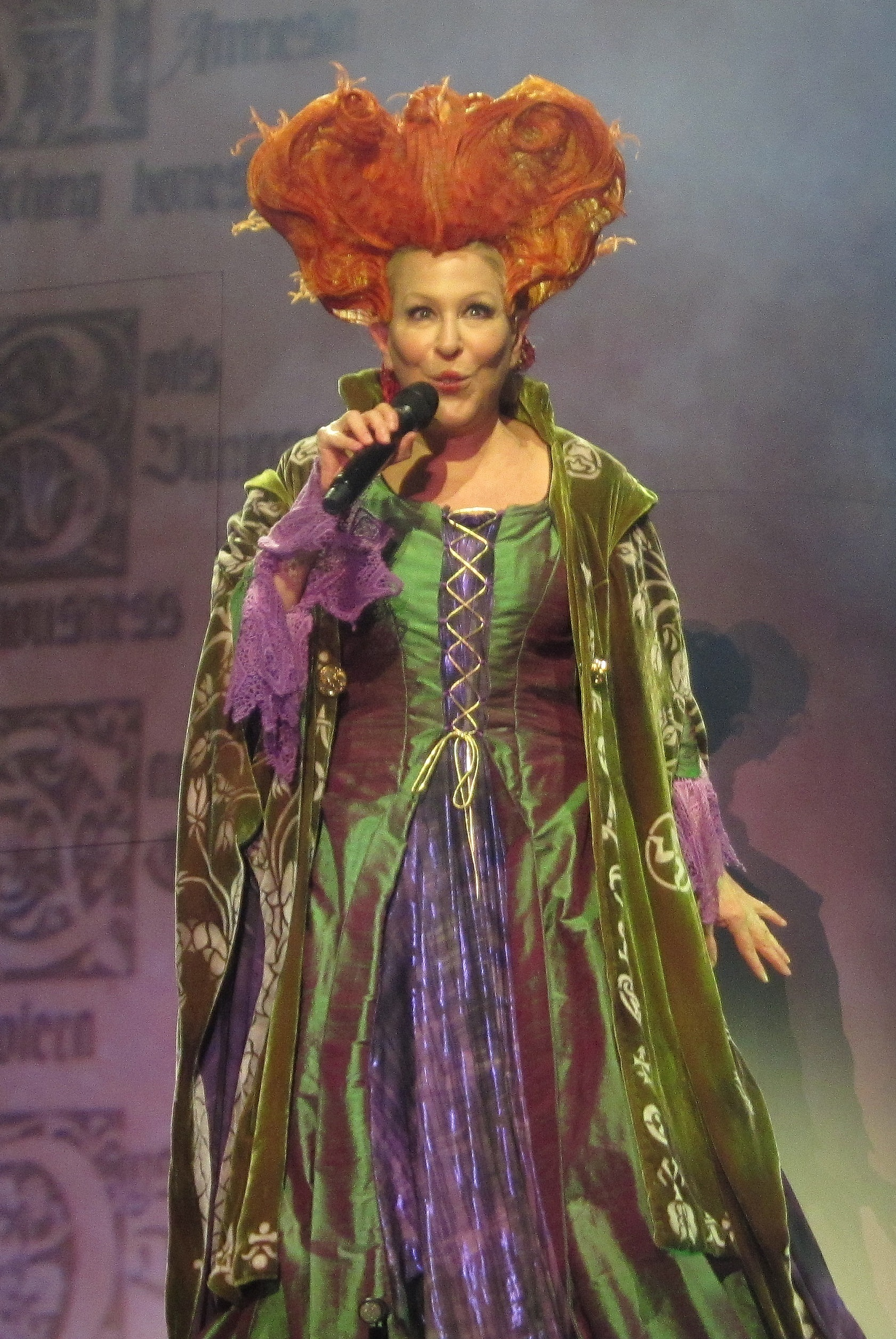
Midler (in her "Winifred Sanderson" costume) performing at her Chicago concert on June 18

This set list is representative of the show on May 8, 2015. It does not represent all concerts for the duration of the tour.

1. "Divine Intervention"
2. "I Look Good"
3. "I've Still Got My Health"
4. "Tenderly"
5. "Throw It Away"
6. "Be My Baby"
7. "Tell Him"
8. "He's Sure the Boy I Love"
9. "Da Doo Ron Ron"
10. "Bei Mir Bist du Schön"
11. "Waterfalls"
12. "Teach Me Tonight"
13. "Everybody Knows"
14. "I Think It's Going to Rain Today"
15. "I Put a Spell on You"
16. "Optimistic Voices"
17. "Bird in the Hand"
18. "Beast of Burden"
19. "Spring Can Really Hang You Up the Most"
20. "Miss Otis Regrets"
21. "The Rose"
22. "From a Distance"
23. "Stay With Me"
24. "Wind Beneath My Wings"
25. "Boogie Woogie Bugle Boy"
26. "Friends" (Final 4 shows only)
27. "Soul to Soul" (The Temptations cover) (Final show London July 19)

== Shows ==
List of concerts, showing date, city, country, venue, opening act, tickets sold, number of available tickets and amount of gross revenue
Date	City	Country	Venue	Attendance	Revenue
Leg 1 – North America
May 8, 2015	Hollywood, Florida	United States	Hard Rock Live	10,211 / 10,211	$1,350,280
May 9, 2015	Hollywood, Florida	United States	Hard Rock Live	10,211 / 10,211	$1,350,280
May 11, 2015	Tampa	United States	Amalie Arena	8,153 / 8,153	$940,398
May 13, 2015	Atlanta	United States	Philips Arena	7,058 / 7,058	$703,777
May 16, 2015	New Orleans	United States	Smoothie King Center	8,005 / 8,005	$872,047
May 18, 2015	Houston	United States	Toyota Center	7,917 / 7,917	$1,056,457
May 20, 2015	Denver	United States	Pepsi Center	6,929 / 6,929	$784,039
May 22, 2015	Las Vegas	United States	MGM Grand Garden Arena	6,762 / 6,762	$1,250,673
May 24, 2015	Phoenix	United States	Talking Stick Resort Arena	7,044 / 7,044	$785,883
May 26, 2015	San Jose	United States	SAP Center at San Jose	10,111 / 10,111	$1,325,586
May 28, 2015	Los Angeles	United States	Staples Center	8,235 / 8,235	$1,210,042
May 29, 2015	Anaheim	United States	Honda Center	8,171 / 8,171	$1,025,135
June 1, 2015	Seattle	United States	KeyArena at Seattle Center	9,640 / 9,640	$1,124,714
June 2, 2015	Vancouver	Canada	Rogers Arena	8,948 / 8,948	$946,046
June 5, 2015	Omaha	United States	CenturyLink Center	6,487 / 6,487	$562,019
June 7, 2015	Saint Paul	United States	Xcel Energy Center	10,136 / 10,136	$1,067,509
June 10, 2015	Auburn Hills	United States	Palace of Auburn Hills	7,409 / 7,409	$814,729
June 12, 2015	Boston	United States	TD Garden	10,303 / 10,303	$1,416,485
June 13, 2015	Uncasville	United States	Mohegan Sun	6,223 / 6,223	$821,812
June 16, 2015	Philadelphia	United States	Wells Fargo Center	11,670 / 11,670	$1,489,325
June 18, 2015	Chicago	United States	United Center	10,950 / 10,950	$1,477,074
June 20, 2015	Toronto	Canada	Air Canada Centre	11,231 / 11,231	$1,223,780
June 22, 2015	Washington, D.C.	United States	Verizon Center	10,160 / 10,160	$1,446,875
June 25, 2015	New York City	United States	Madison Square Garden	23,643 / 23,643	$3,598,973
June 26, 2015	New York City	United States	Madison Square Garden	23,643 / 23,643	$3,598,973
June 29, 2015	New York City	United States	Barclays Center	8,128 / 8,128	$946,634
Leg 2 – Europe
July 9, 2015	Birmingham	England	Barclaycard Arena	10,109 / 10,109	$1,279,478
July 11, 2015	Manchester	England	Manchester Arena	11,970 / 11,970	$1,477,704
July 13, 2015	Glasgow	Scotland	The SSE Hydro	9,656 / 9,656	$1,274,435
July 15, 2015	Leeds	England	First Direct Arena	8,893 / 8,893	$1,131,364
July 18, 2015	London	England	The O_{2} Arena	22,991 / 22,991	$3,240,003
July 19, 2015	London	England	The O_{2} Arena	22,991 / 22,991	$3,240,003
Total				287,143 / 287,143	$36,643,276
