= The Showgirl Must Go On =

Bette Midler concert residency in Las Vegas

- Residency by Bette Midler
- Associated album: Jackpot: The Best Bette
- Start date: February 20, 2008
- End date: January 31, 2010
- Legs: 10
- No. of shows: 66 in 2008; 85 in 2009; 18 in 2010; 169 in total
- Attendance: 537,817
- Box office: $71.8 million (Note: $106.01 million in 2025 dollars.)

Bette Midler concert chronology
- Kiss My Brass (2003–05); The Showgirl Must Go On (2008–10); Divine Intervention Tour (2015)

The Showgirl Must Go On was a concert residency by the American singer Bette Midler. Held at The Colosseum at Caesars Palace on the Las Vegas Strip in Paradise, Nevada, the show premiered on February 20, 2008 and closed on January 31, 2010. Midler signed for 300 shows from 2008 to 2010 at a pace of 100 performances a year. Shows were presented five nights a week with the house dark on Mondays and Thursdays. According to Billboard, the residency sold 537,817 tickets and grossed almost $72 million.

== Setlist ==
1. "Big Noise from Winnetka"
2. "The Showgirl Must Go On"
3. "In the Mood"
4. "Friends"
5. "The Rose"
6. "Do You Want to Dance?"
7. "From a Distance"
8. "My Kind of Town"
9. "It's Now or Never"
10. "Viva Las Vegas"
11. "Lucky Be My Lady"
12. "Blue Hawaii"
13. "Hello in There"
14. "When a Man Loves a Woman"
15. "Pretty Legs"
16. "Hot in Here"
17. "The Glory of Love"
18. "Boogie Woogie Bugle Boy"
19. "Wind Beneath My Wings"

== Concert dates ==
All shows were performed at The Colosseum at Caesars Palace in Las Vegas, Nevada.

Date
1st Leg
February 20, 2008
February 22, 2008
February 23, 2008
February 24, 2008
February 26, 2008
February 27, 2008
February 28, 2008
March 1, 2008
March 2, 2008
March 4, 2008
March 5, 2008
March 7, 2008
March 8, 2008
March 9, 2008
March 11, 2008
March 12, 2008
March 13, 2008
March 15, 2008
March 16, 2008
2nd Leg
June 24, 2008
June 25, 2008
June 27, 2008
June 28, 2008
June 29, 2008
July 1, 2008
July 2, 2008
July 4, 2008
July 5, 2008
July 6, 2008
July 8, 2008
July 9, 2008
July 11, 2008
July 12, 2008
July 13, 2008
July 15, 2008
July 16, 2008
July 18, 2008
July 19, 2008
July 20, 2008
3rd Leg
October 9, 2008
October 10, 2008
October 11, 2008
October 12, 2008
October 14, 2008
October 15, 2008
October 17, 2008
October 18, 2008
October 19, 2008
4th Leg
November 11, 2008
November 12, 2008
November 14, 2008
November 15, 2008
November 16, 2008
November 25, 2008
November 26, 2008
November 28, 2008
November 29, 2008
November 30, 2008
December 2, 2008
December 3, 2008
December 5, 2008
December 7, 2008
December 9, 2008
December 10, 2008
5th Leg
December 30, 2008
December 31, 2008
January 2, 2009
January 3, 2009
January 4, 2009
January 6, 2009
January 7, 2009
January 10, 2009
January 11, 2009
January 13, 2009
January 14, 2009
January 17, 2009
January 18, 2009
January 20, 2009
January 21, 2009
January 24, 2009
January 25, 2009
6th Leg
March 24, 2009
March 25, 2009
March 27, 2009
March 28, 2009
March 29, 2009
March 31, 2009
April 1, 2009
April 3, 2009
April 4, 2009
April 5, 2009
7th Leg
May 27, 2009
May 29, 2009
May 30, 2009
May 31, 2009
June 2, 2009
June 3, 2009
June 6, 2009
June 7, 2009
June 9, 2009
June 10, 2009
June 12, 2009
June 13, 2009
June 14, 2009
June 16, 2009
June 17, 2009
June 20, 2009
June 21, 2009
June 23, 2009
June 24, 2009
June 26, 2009
June 27, 2009
June 28, 2009
8th Leg
August 11, 2009
August 12, 2009
August 14, 2009
August 15, 2009
August 16, 2009
August 18, 2009
August 19, 2009
August 22, 2009
August 23, 2009
August 25, 2009
August 26, 2009
August 29, 2009
August 30, 2009
September 1, 2009
September 2, 2009
September 4, 2009
September 5, 2009
September 6, 2009
9th Leg
October 14, 2009
October 16, 2009
October 17, 2009
October 18, 2009
October 20, 2009
October 21, 2009
October 23, 2009
October 24, 2009
October 25, 2009
November 3, 2009
November 4, 2009
November 7, 2009
November 8, 2009
November 10, 2009
November 11, 2009
November 13, 2009
November 14, 2009
November 15, 2009
10th Leg
December 30, 2009
December 31, 2009
January 2, 2010
January 3, 2010
January 5, 2010
January 6, 2010
January 9, 2010
January 10, 2010
January 12, 2010
January 13, 2010
January 16, 2010
January 17, 2010
January 19, 2010
January 20, 2010
January 23, 2010
January 24, 2010
January 26, 2010
January 27, 2010
January 30, 2010
January 31, 2010

== Recordings ==
On December 31, 2010, The Showgirl Must Go On was broadcast on HBO channels at 9 pm. The 70 minute special contained some of the performances from the 2 hour long show.

The DVD of this pared down performance was released on October 4, 2011.

== See also ==
- List of most-attended concert series at a single venue
