= The Saga of Baby Divine =

1983 children's picture book written by Bette Midler and illustrated by Todd Schorr

The Saga of Baby Divine is a children's picture book written by Bette Midler and illustrated by Todd Schorr. It was originally published in 1983 by Crown Publishers, New York.

It has been shown in a poster produced by the American Library Association, one of a series of posters where American celebrities such as Paul Newman, Isiah Thomas, and Michael J. Fox implored people to patronize their libraries and read. In 1985, Bette Midler was shown in one such poster with a copy of The Saga of Baby Divine.
