= Bette Midler =

American actress and singer (born 1945)

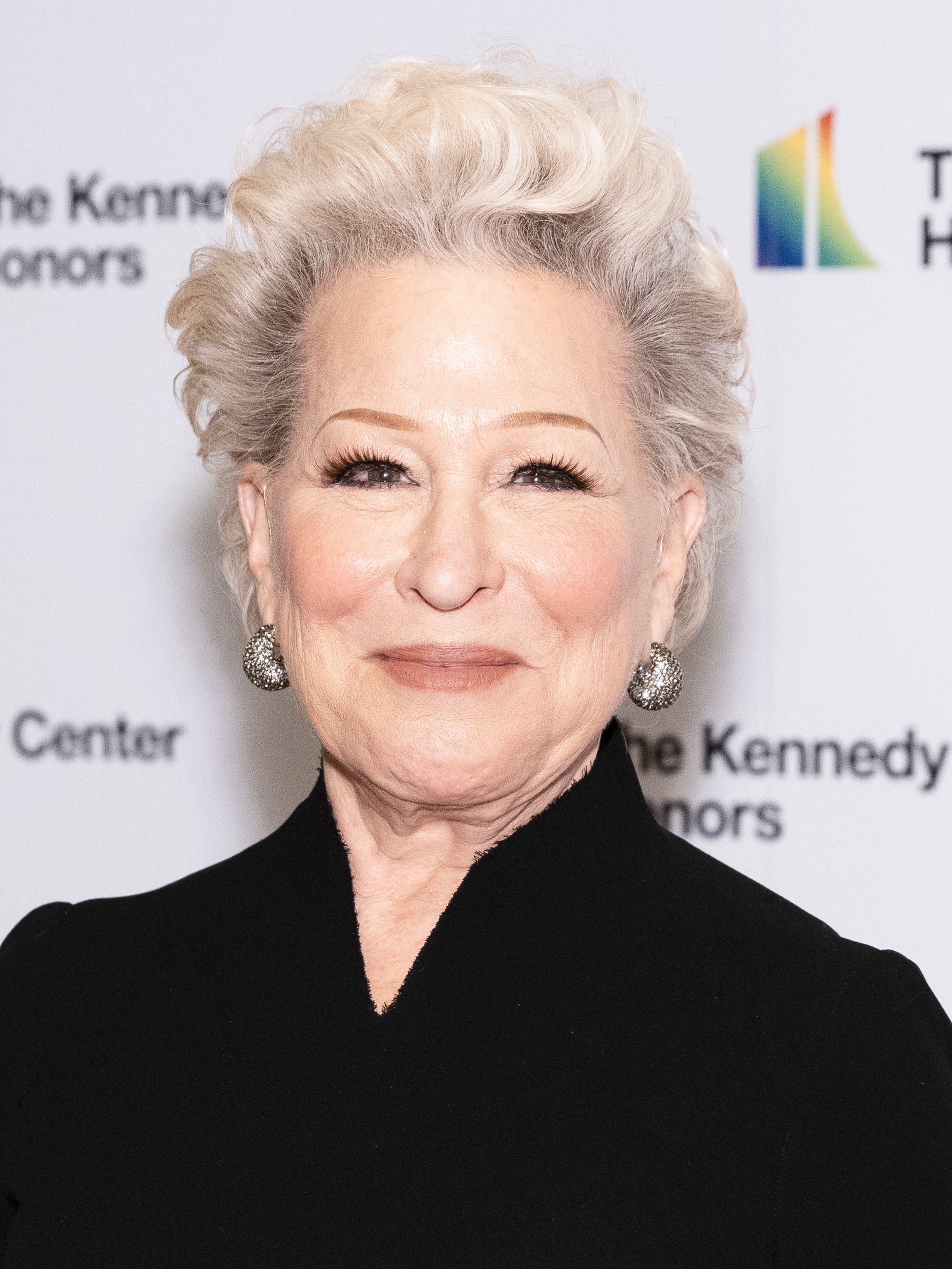
- Midler in 2021
- Born: December 1, 1945 (age 80); Honolulu, Territory of Hawaii, U.S.
- Other name: "The Divine Miss M"
- Occupations: Actress; comedian; singer; author
- Years active: 1965–present
- Political party: Democratic
- Spouse: Martin von Haselberg (m. 1984)
- Children: Sophie von Haselberg
- Awards: Full list
- Musical career
- Genres: Traditional pop; vocal; pop; musical comedy
- Instruments: Vocals; ukulele
- Labels: Atlantic; Warner Bros.; Columbia; Warner Music Group
- Website: bettemidler.com

Bette Midler (/bɛt ˈmɪdlər/ bet MID-lər; born December 1, 1945) is an American actress, comedian, singer, and author. Throughout her six-decade career Midler has received numerous accolades, including four Golden Globe Awards, three Grammy Awards, three Primetime Emmy Awards, two Tony Awards, and a Kennedy Center Honor, in addition to nominations for two Academy Awards and a British Academy Film Award.

Born in Honolulu, Hawaii, Midler began her professional career in several off-off-Broadway plays, prior to her engagements in Fiddler on the Roof and Salvation on Broadway in the late 1960s. She came to prominence in 1970 when she began singing in the Continental Baths, a local gay bathhouse where she managed to build up a core following. Since 1970, Midler has released 14 studio albums as a solo artist, selling over 30 million records worldwide, and has received four Gold, three Platinum, and three Multiplatinum albums by RIAA. Many of her songs became chart hits, including her renditions of "The Rose", "Wind Beneath My Wings", "Do You Want to Dance?", "Boogie Woogie Bugle Boy", and "From a Distance". She won Grammy Awards for Best New Artist, Best Female Pop Vocal Performance for "The Rose", and Record of the Year for "Wind Beneath My Wings".

Midler made her starring film debut with the musical drama The Rose (1979), which won her the Golden Globe Award for Best Actress – Motion Picture Comedy or Musical, as well as nominations for the Academy Award for Best Actress, the BAFTA Award for Best Actress in a Leading Role, the New York Film Critics Circle Award for Best Actress, and the National Society of Film Critics Award for Best Actress. She went on to star in numerous films, including Down and Out in Beverly Hills (1986), Ruthless People (1986), Outrageous Fortune (1987), Big Business (1988), Beaches (1988), Stella (1990), Hocus Pocus (1993) and its sequel (2022), The First Wives Club (1996), The Stepford Wives (2004), Parental Guidance (2012), and The Addams Family (2019) and its sequel (2021). Midler also had starring roles in For the Boys (1991) and Gypsy (1993), winning two additional Golden Globe Awards for these films and receiving a second Academy Award nomination for the former.

Midler held a residency at Caesars Palace in Las Vegas with the show Bette Midler: The Showgirl Must Go On from 2008 to 2010. She starred in the Broadway revival of Hello, Dolly!, which began previews in March 2017 and premiered at the Shubert Theatre in April 2017. The show was her first leading role in a Broadway musical. Midler received the Tony Award for Best Actress in a Musical for her performance.

== Early life ==
Bette Midler was born in Honolulu, Hawaii. She was the third of four children born to Ruth (née Schindel; 1911–1979) and Fred Midler (1908–1986). Midler's family was one of the few Jewish families that lived in a mostly Asian neighborhood. Her mother was a seamstress and housewife, and her father worked at a U.S. Navy base in Hawaii as a painter and also painted houses. Both parents were born in New Jersey. She was named after actress Bette Davis, although Davis pronounced her first name in two syllables (phonetically like "Betty") and Midler uses one syllable (phonetically like "bet"). She was raised in Aiea and attended Radford High School in Honolulu. She was voted "Most Talkative" in the 1961 school Hoss Election and "Most Dramatic" in her senior year (class of 1963).

Midler majored in drama at the University of Hawaii at Manoa, but she dropped out after three semesters. She performed as an extra in the 1966 film Hawaii, playing an uncredited seasick passenger named Miss David Buff.

== Career ==
=== 1965–1971: Beginnings and early theatre work ===
Midler relocated to New York City in the summer of 1965, using money from her work in the film Hawaii. She studied theatre at HB Studio under Uta Hagen. She landed her first professional onstage role in Tom Eyen's off-off-Broadway plays in 1965, Miss Nefertiti Regrets and Cinderella Revisited, a children's play by day and an adult show by night. In October 1966, she joined the Broadway company of Fiddler on the Roof, playing the ensemble role of Rivka and understudying the oldest daughter Tzeitel. She assumed the role of Tzeitel in February 1967 and played the role until February 1970. After Fiddler, she joined the original cast of Salvation in 1969.

In the summer of 1970, Midler began singing at the Continental Baths, a gay bathhouse in the basement of the Ansonia Hotel. During this time, she became close to her piano accompanist, Barry Manilow—also a regular performer at the Continental Baths—who produced her first album in 1972, The Divine Miss M. It was during her time at the Continental Baths that she built up a core following. In the late 1990s, during the release of her album Bathhouse Betty (1998), Midler commented on her time performing there, "Despite the way things turned out [with the AIDS crisis], I'm still proud of those days. I feel like I was at the forefront of the gay liberation movement, and I hope I did my part to help it move forward. So, I kind of wear the label of 'Bathhouse Betty' with pride."

Midler starred in the first professional production of the Who's rock opera Tommy in 1971, with director Richard Pearlman and the Seattle Opera. It was during the run of Tommy that Midler first appeared on The Tonight Show.

=== 1972–1980: The Divine Miss M and success ===
Midler with Dustin Hoffman on a Bette Midler TV special (1977)

Midler released her debut album, The Divine Miss M, on Atlantic Records in December 1972. The album was co-produced by Barry Manilow, who was Bette's arranger and music conductor at the time. It reached Billboard's Top 10 and became a million-selling Platinum-certified album, earning Midler the 1973 Grammy Award for Best New Artist. It featured three hit singles—"Do You Wanna Dance?", "Friends", and "Boogie Woogie Bugle Boy"—the third of which became Midler's first No. 1 Adult Contemporary hit. "Bugle Boy" became a successful cover of the classic swing tune originally introduced and popularized in 1941 by the Andrews Sisters, to whom Midler has repeatedly referred as her idols and inspiration, as far back as her first appearances on The Tonight Show Starring Johnny Carson. Midler told Carson in an interview that she always wanted to move like the sisters, and Patty Andrews remembered: "When I first heard the introduction on the radio, I thought it was our old record. When Bette opened at the Amphitheater in Los Angeles, Maxene and I went backstage to see her. Her first words were, 'What else did you record?'" During another Midler concert, Maxene went on stage and presented her with an honorary bugle. Bette recorded other Andrews Sisters hits, including "In the Mood" and "Lullaby of Broadway".

Her self-titled follow-up album was released at the end of 1973. Again, the album was co-produced by Manilow. It reached Billboard's Top 10 and eventually sold close to a million copies in the United States alone. Midler returned to recording with the 1976 and 1977 albums Songs for the New Depression and Broken Blossom. In 1974, she received a Special Tony Award for her contribution to Broadway, with Clams on the Half Shell Revue playing at the Minskoff Theater.

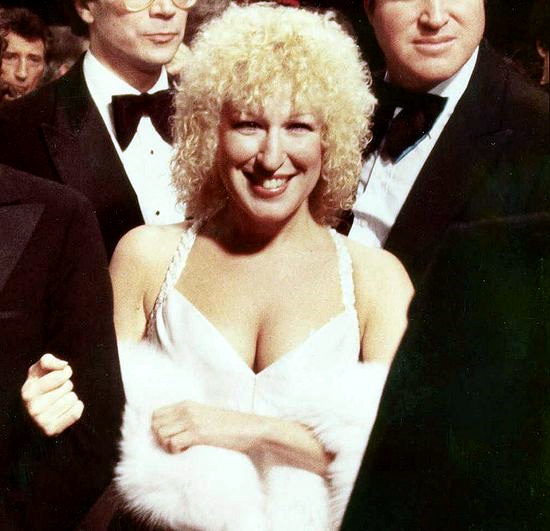
Midler at the premiere of her feature-film starring debut, The Rose, in 1979

From 1975 to 1978, she also provided the voice of Woody the Spoon on the PBS educational series Vegetable Soup. In 1977, Midler's first television special, whose title, Ol' Red Hair is Back, was a takeoff on Frank Sinatra's Ol' Blue Eyes Is Back, premiered, featuring guest stars Dustin Hoffman and Emmett Kelly. It went on to win the Emmy Award for Outstanding Special – Comedy-Variety or Music. In 1977 she also released her first live album, Live at Last, a double album taken from concert performances in Cleveland, Ohio.

Midler made her first motion picture in 1979, starring in the 1960s-era rock and roll tragedy The Rose, as a drug-addicted rock star modeled after Janis Joplin. That year, she also released her fifth studio album, Thighs and Whispers. Midler's first foray into disco was a commercial and critical failure and went on to be her all-time lowest charting album, peaking at No. 65 on the Billboard album chart. Soon afterward, she began a world concert tour, with one of her shows in Pasadena being filmed and released as the concert film Divine Madness (1980).

Her performance in The Rose earned her a nomination for Academy Award for Best Actress, a role for which she won the Golden Globe for Best Actress (Comedy or Musical). The film's acclaimed soundtrack album sold over two million copies in the United States alone, earning a Double Platinum certification. The single version of the title song, which Amanda McBroom had written and composed, held the No. 1 position on Billboard's Adult Contemporary chart for five consecutive weeks and reached No. 3 on Billboard's Hot 100. It earned Midler her first Gold single and won the Grammy award for Best Pop Vocal Performance, Female.

=== 1981–1989: "Wind Beneath My Wings", Beaches, and chart comeback ===
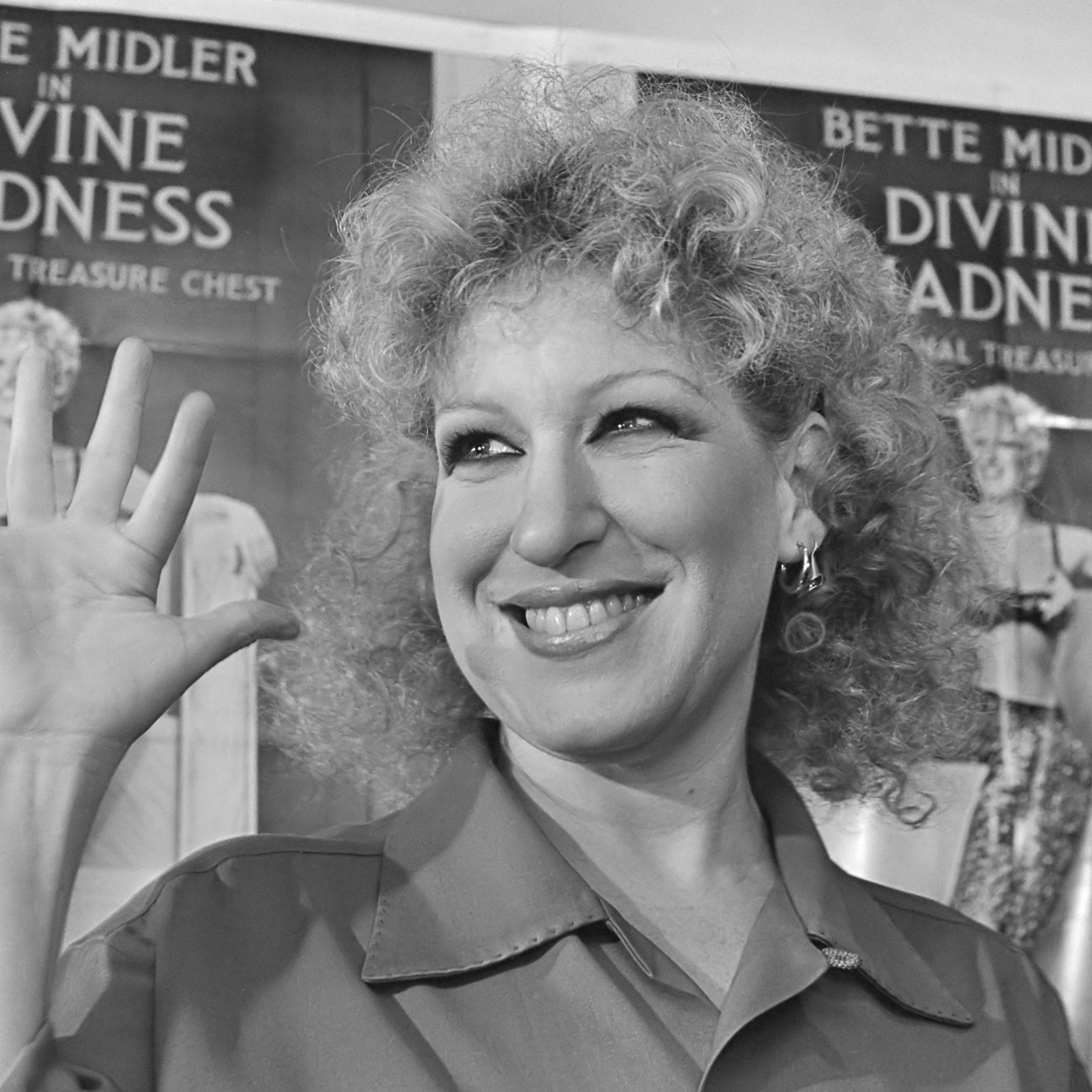
Midler in Amsterdam promoting the 1980 film Divine Madness

Midler worked on the troubled comedy project Jinxed! in 1981. However, during production, there was friction with co-star Ken Wahl and the film's director, Don Siegel. Released in 1982, the film was a major flop. Midler did not appear in any other films until 1986; however, she was an early choice for Miss Hannigan in the 1982 film Annie. During those four years, she concentrated on her music career and in 1983, released the album No Frills, produced by Chuck Plotkin, who was best known for his work with Bob Dylan and Bruce Springsteen. The album included three single releases: the ballad "All I Need to Know", a cover of Detroit native Marshall Crenshaw's "You're My Favorite Waste of Time"—which Midler fell in love with after flipping his 45 of "Someday Someway"—and Midler's take on the Rolling Stones' "Beast of Burden". She also released an all-comedy album (with a few songs tied into the comedy) called Mud Will Be Flung Tonight in 1985.

Midler performed on USA for Africa's 1985 fund-raising single "We Are the World", and participated at the Live Aid event at JFK Stadium in Philadelphia. Also in 1985, she signed a multi-picture deal with the Walt Disney Studios, where she starred in a string of successful films produced by the studio's newly formed Touchstone Pictures division. She also produced them through her production banner, All Girl Productions with producing partner Bonnie Bruckheimer. She was subsequently cast by director Paul Mazursky in Down and Out in Beverly Hills, beginning a successful comedic acting career. She followed that role with several more Touchstone comedies, Ruthless People (1986), Outrageous Fortune (1987), and Big Business (1988). Later in 1988, Midler lent her voice to the animated character Georgette, a snobbish poodle, in Disney's Oliver & Company, and had a hit with Beaches, co-starring Barbara Hershey. The accompanying soundtrack remains Midler's all-time biggest selling disc, reaching No. 2 on Billboard's album chart and with U.S. sales of four million copies. It featured her biggest hit, "Wind Beneath My Wings", which went to No. 1 on Billboard's Hot 100, achieved Platinum status, and won Midler her third Grammy Award – for Record of the Year – at the 1990 telecast.

=== 1990–1999: Further acting career, and television appearances ===
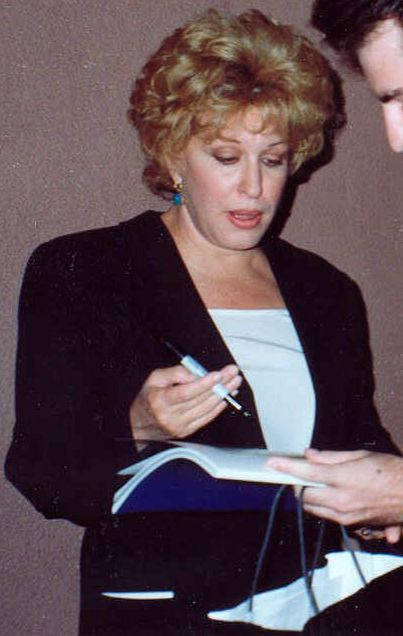
Midler in 1990

Midler's 1990 cover of the Julie Gold song "From a Distance", the first offering from her seventh studio album Some People's Lives (1990), topped the Billboard Adult Contemporary charts and achieved platinum status in the US. The same year, she starred along with Trini Alvarado as the title character in John Erman's drama film Stella. The third feature film adaptation of the 1920 novel Stella Dallas by Olive Higgins Prouty, Midler portrayed a vulgar single mother living in Watertown, New York, who, determined to give her daughter all the opportunities she never had, ultimately makes a selfless sacrifice to ensure her happiness. The movie scored mediocre reviews, while Midler received her first Razzie Award nomination for Worst Actress.

She co-starred with Woody Allen in the 1991 film Scenes from a Mall, again for Paul Mazursky. In the film, Allen's character reveals to his author wife Deborah, played by Midler, after years of a happy marriage, that he has had an affair, resulting in her request for divorce. The movie performed poorly, and received a mixed reception by critics. Midler fared somewhat better with her other 1991 project For the Boys, on which she reteamed with The Rose director Mark Rydell. A historical musical drama, it tells the story of 1940s actress and singer Dixie Leonard, played by Midler, who teams up with Eddie Sparks, a famous performer, to entertain American troops. While the film received a mixed reception from critics, Midler earned rave reviews for her portrayal. The following year she was awarded her second Golden Globe and received her second Academy Award nomination for Best Actress.

Midler turned down the lead role in the musical comedy Sister Act in 1992, which instead went to Whoopi Goldberg. Midler won an Emmy Award in 1992 for her performance on the penultimate episode of The Tonight Show Starring Johnny Carson in May 1992, during which she sang an emotion-laden "One for My Baby (and One More for the Road)" to Johnny Carson. During the show, Midler began singing "Here's That Rainy Day", Carson's favorite song; Carson joined in a few lyrics later. In 1993, she starred with Sarah Jessica Parker and Kathy Najimy in the Walt Disney Halloween comedy fantasy film, Hocus Pocus. Midler played the lead role of Winifred ‘Winnie’ Sanderson, the head witch and eldest of the fictional Sanderson Sisters; the sisters are a trio of convicted colonial-era witches who were executed by hanging during the Salem Witch Trials, and then magically brought back to life in the 1990s by a teenager who lights a magic candle. Released to initially mixed reviews, through various outlets (such as strong DVD sales and annual record-breaking showings on 13 Nights of Halloween), the film has achieved cult status over the years. In relation to Hocus Pocus, every year Midler hosts her annual Hulaween costume party, which benefits the New York Restoration Project. Her television work includes an Emmy-nominated version of the stage musical Gypsy and a guest appearance as herself in Fran Drescher's The Nanny.

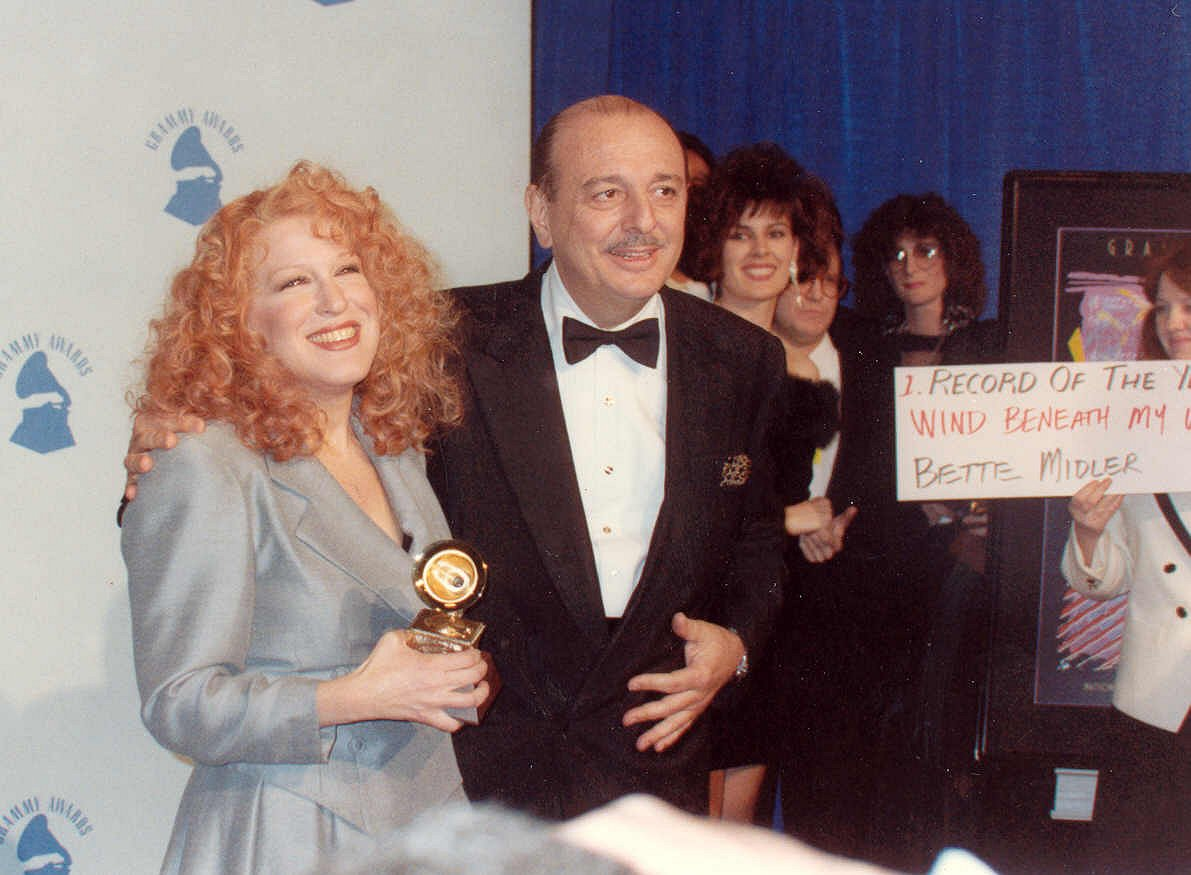
Midler with producer Arif Mardin after winning two trophies at the 32nd Grammy Awards for the Record and the Song of the Year for "Wind Beneath My Wings", 1990

Midler appeared on Seinfeld in "The Understudy" episode, that show's sixth-season finale in May 1995. That same year, she had a supporting role in Get Shorty. Her 1997 HBO special Diva Las Vegas earned her a third Emmy Award, for Outstanding Performance in a Variety or Music Program. Midler's other 1990s films include The First Wives Club (1996). In 1997, Midler, along with her co-stars from The First Wives Club, Goldie Hawn and Diane Keaton, was a recipient of the Women in Film Crystal Award, which honors "outstanding women who, through their endurance and the excellence of their work, have helped to expand the role of women within the entertainment industry".

In 1998, Midler released her ninth studio album, Bathhouse Betty, named after the nickname she was given for performing at bathhouses early in her career. In 1999, she appeared in an episode of the CBS sitcom Murphy Brown and was featured in the animated musical film Fantasia 2000.

=== 2000–2005: Bette sitcom, tribute albums, and Kiss My Brass tour ===
Midler starred in her own sitcom in 2000, Bette, which featured Midler playing a version of herself, a divine celebrity who is adored by her fans. Airing on CBS, initial ratings were high, marking the best sitcom debut for the network in more than five years, but viewers percentage soon declined, resulting in the show's cancellation in early 2001. Midler openly griped about the show's demanding shooting schedule, while the show itself was also reportedly rocked by backstage turmoil, involving the replacement of co-star Kevin Dunn whose departure was attributed by the media to his behind-the scenes bickering with Midler. However, Midler, critically praised, was awarded a People's Choice Award for her performance in the show and received a Golden Globe Award nomination the following year. Also in 2000, Midler made an uncredited cameo appearance in Nancy Meyers' fantasy rom–com What Women Want, starring Mel Gibson and Helen Hunt. In the film, she portrayed a therapist who realizes that central character Nick, played by Gibson, is able to understand women's thoughts. Released to generally mixed reviews, it became the then-most successful film ever directed by a woman, taking in $183 million in the United States, and grossing upward of $370 million worldwide.

The same year Midler starred in Isn't She Great and Drowning Mona. In Andrew Bergman's Isn't She Great, a highly fictionalized account of the life and career of author Jacqueline Susann, she played alongside Nathan Lane and Stockard Channing, portraying Susann with her early struggles as an aspiring actress relentlessly hungry for fame, her relationship with press agent Irving Mansfield, her success as the author of Valley of the Dolls, and her battle with and subsequent death from breast cancer. The dramedy garnered largely negative reviews by critics, who dismissed it as "bland material [that] produces entirely forgettable comic performances." For her performance in the film, Midler received her second Golden Raspberry Award nomination for Worst Actress at the 21st ceremony. In Nick Gomez's dark comedy Drowning Mona, Midler appeared along with Danny DeVito and Jamie Lee Curtis, playing title character Mona Dearly, a spiteful, loud-mouthed, cruel and highly unpopular woman, whose mysterious death is investigated. Another critical fiasco, reviewers noted that the film "drowns itself in humor that never rises above sitcom level."

After nearly three decades of erratic record sales, Midler was dropped from the Warner Music Group in 2001. Following a reported long-standing feud with Barry Manilow, the two joined forces after many years in 2003 to record Bette Midler Sings the Rosemary Clooney Songbook. Now signed to Columbia Records, the album was an instant success, being certified gold by RIAA. One of the Clooney Songbook selections, "This Ole House", became Midler's first Christian radio single shipped by Rick Hendrix and his positive music movement. The album was nominated for a Grammy the following year.

Throughout 2003 and 2004, Midler toured the United States in her new show, Kiss My Brass, to sell-out audiences. Also in 2004, she appeared in a supporting role in Frank Oz' science fiction satire The Stepford Wives, a remake of the 1975 film of the same name also based on the Ira Levin novel. Also starring Nicole Kidman, Matthew Broderick, Christopher Walken and Glenn Close, Midler played Bobbie Markowitz, a writer and recovering alcoholic. The project underwent numerous production problems that occurred throughout its shooting schedule, with reports of problems on-set between director Oz and the actors being rampant in the press. Oz later blamed Midler—who was amid recording her next album and rehearsing for her tour—for being under a lot of stress by other projects and making "the mistake of bringing her stress on the set." While the original book and film had tremendous cultural impact, the remake was marked by poor reviews by many critics, and a financial loss of approximately $40 million at the box office.

Midler joined forces again with Manilow for another tribute album, Bette Midler Sings the Peggy Lee Songbook. Released in October 2005, the album sold 55,000 copies the first week of release, returned Midler to the top ten of US Billboard 200, and was nominated for a Grammy Award.

=== 2006–2011: Albums, Vegas show and appearances ===
Midler released a new Christmas album titled Cool Yule in 2006, which featured a duet of Christmastime pop standards "Winter Wonderland"/"Let It Snow" with Johnny Mathis. Well-received, the album garnered a Grammy Award nomination for Best Traditional Pop Vocal Album in 2007. The same year, Midler returned to the big screen, appearing in Then She Found Me, Helen Hunt's feature film directorial debut. Also starring Hunt along with Matthew Broderick and Colin Firth, the comedy-drama film tells the story of a 39-year-old Brooklyn elementary school teacher, who after years is contacted by the flamboyant host of a local talk show, played by Midler, who introduces herself as her biological mother. Critical response to the film was mixed; whereas some critics praised the film for having strong performances, others felt the film was bogged down by a weak script and technical issues.

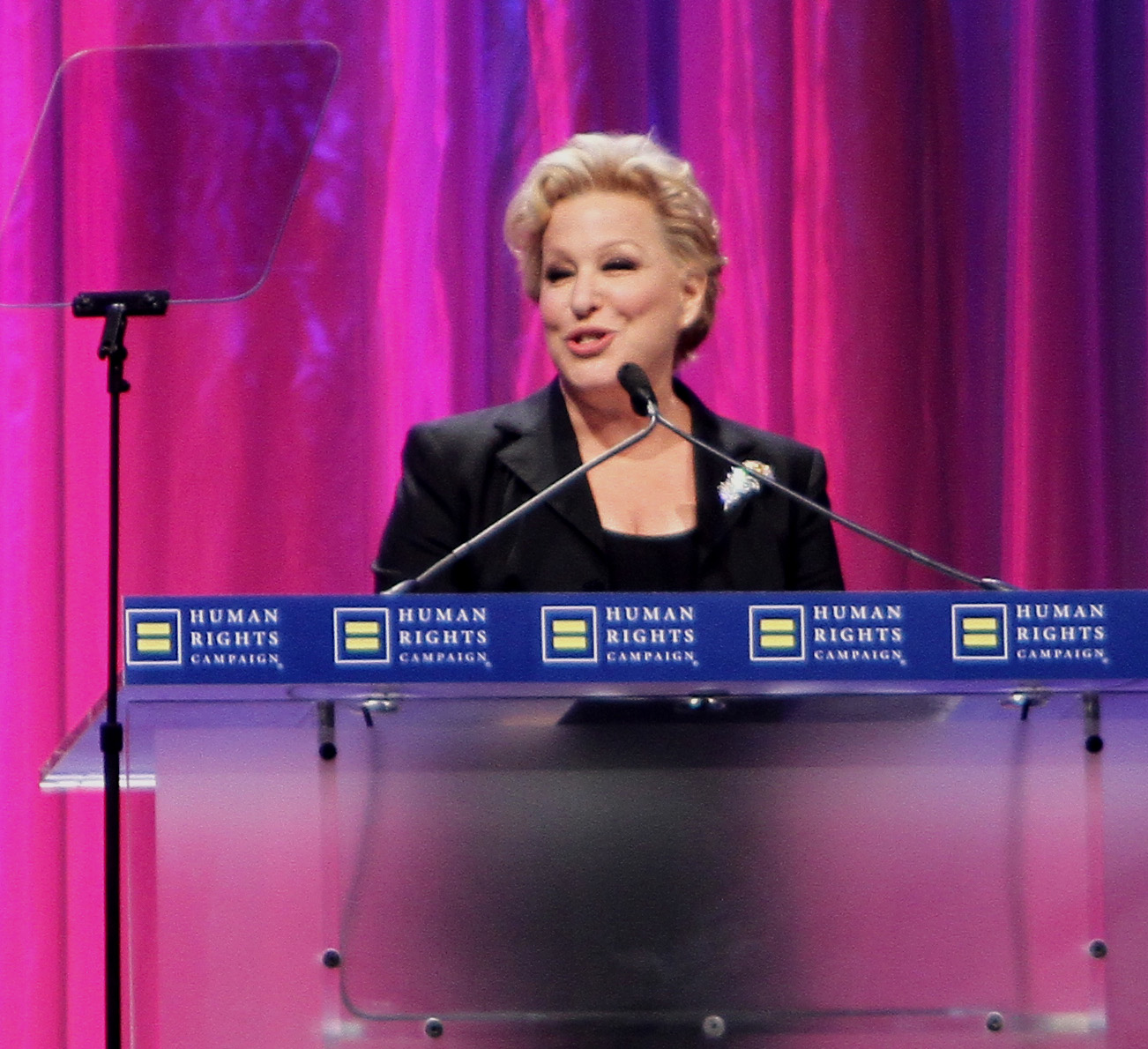
Midler at the 2010 HRC Annual Dinner

Midler debuted her Vegas show titled Bette Midler: The Showgirl Must Go On at The Colosseum at Caesars Palace on February 20, 2008. It comprised The Staggering Harlettes, 20 female dancers called The Caesar Salad Girls and a 13-piece band. The show played its final performance on January 31, 2010, and was nominated for a Primetime Emmy Award for Outstanding Variety, Music, or Comedy Special in 2011. Also in 2008, another compilation album by Midler, Jackpot: The Best Bette, was released. It reached number 66 on the U.S. Billboard 200 chart, and number six in the United Kingdom, where it was certified platinum for sales of over 300,000 copies. As her only film appearance that year, Midler had a small role in Diane English's comedy film The Women, starring Meg Ryan, Annette Bening and Eva Mendes among others. An updated version of the George Cukor-directed 1939 film of the same name based on a 1936 play by Clare Boothe Luce, the film was widely panned by critics, who found it "...a toothless remake of the 1939 classic, lacking the charm, wit and compelling protagonists of the original."

Midler appeared on the Bravo TV show My Life on the D-List with Kathy Griffin in an episode that aired in June 2009. In December of the same year, she appeared in the Royal Variety Performance, an annual British charity event attended by Queen Elizabeth II. Midler performed "In My Life" and "Wind Beneath My Wings" as the closing act. In 2010, Midler voiced the character Kitty Galore in the animated film Cats & Dogs: The Revenge of Kitty Galore. The film was a success, grossing $112 million worldwide. In November 2010, Midler released Memories of You, another compilation of lesser known tracks from her catalog. Midler was one of the producers of the Broadway production of the musical Priscilla, Queen of the Desert, which opened in February 2011.

=== 2012–present: Return to Broadway ===
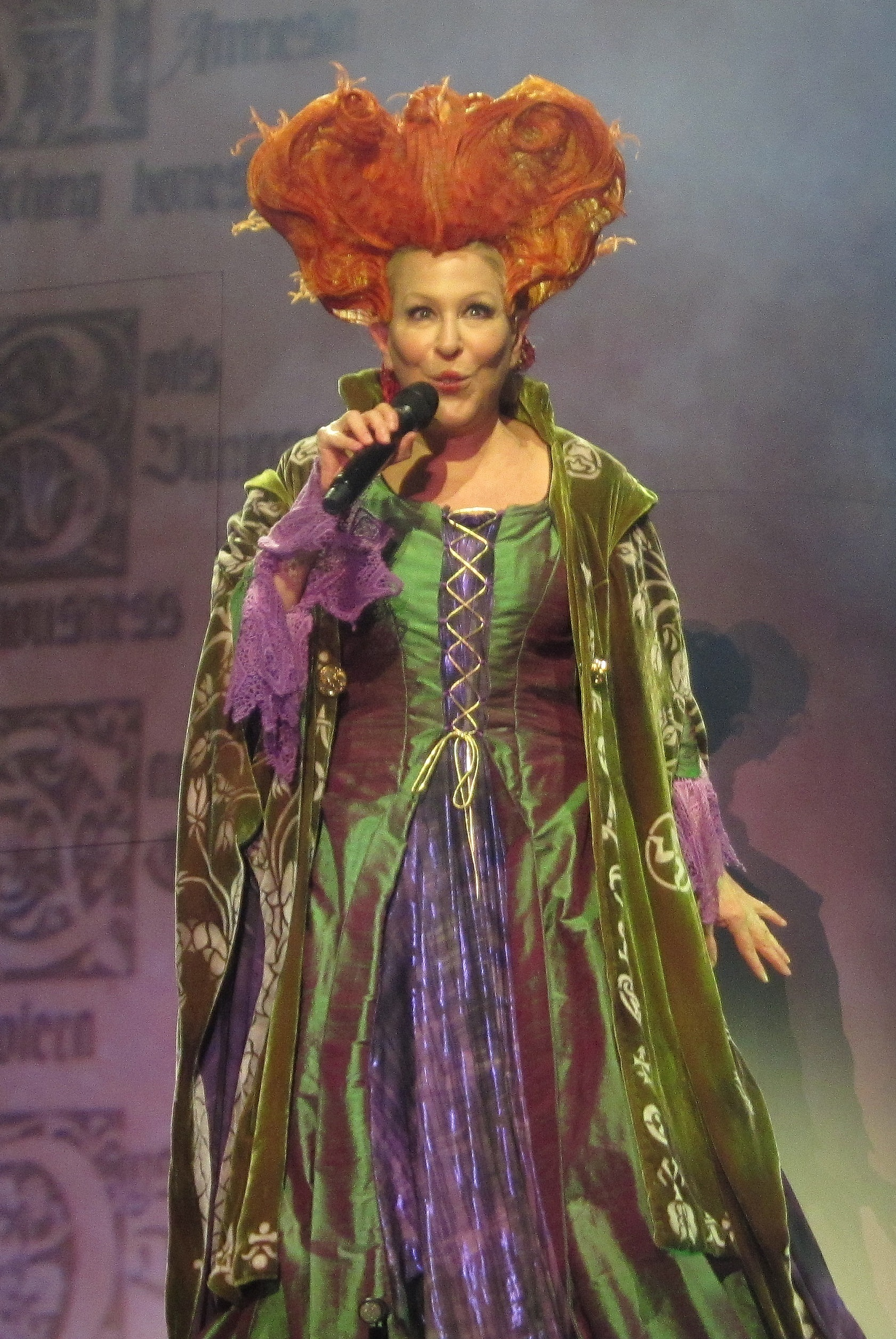
Midler (in costume as her character Winifred Sanderson from Hocus Pocus) performing on her Divine Intervention Tour in 2015

Midler received the Sammy Cahn Lifetime Achievement Award at the Songwriters Hall of Fame in June 2012, recognizing how she "captivated the world" with her "stylish presentation and unmistakable voice." The same year, she co-starred alongside Billy Crystal in the family film Parental Guidance, playing a couple of old school grandparents trying to adapt to their daughter's 21st-century parenting style. Despite generally negative reviews by critics, who felt the film was "sweet but milquetoast", box office totals for the movie were higher than initially expected.

Midler portrayed Hollywood super-agent Sue Mengers in the play I'll Eat You Last: A Chat with Sue Mengers, dramatized by John Logan, opening April 24, 2013, at the Booth Theatre, her first time on Broadway in three decades. After the show's success in New York, recouping its initial $2.4 million investment, the play transferred to Los Angeles at the Geffen Playhouse. A December 2013 announcement cast Midler as actress Mae West in an HBO biopic written by Harvey Fierstein and directed by William Friedkin. (The project remains unproduced, and Friedkin passed away in 2023.)

She performed at the 2014 Academy Awards at the Dolby Theatre, singing "Wind Beneath My Wings" during the in memoriam tribute. In November the same year, Midler released It's the Girls! through Warner Bros. Records, her 25th album. The album spans seven decades of famous girl groups, from 1930s trios The Boswell Sisters and The Andrews Sisters to 1990s R&B legends such as TLC and their single "Waterfalls".

She returned to the stage in the titular role of Hello, Dolly! for the 2017 Broadway revival, earning her a Tony Award. In 2017, she also appeared in the role of Muv in the 2017 film Freak Show. Midler continued in Hello, Dolly! through January 2018, then returned in July to close out the run of the successful revival.

Midler performed the song "The Place Where Lost Things Go" from Mary Poppins Returns at the 91st Annual Academy Awards ceremony on February 24, 2019. Midler voiced the character of Grandmama, Gomez and Fester's mother, in the animated film version of The Addams Family released in October 2019. She reprised the role in the 2021 sequel The Addams Family 2. Midler portrayed Bella Abzug in The Glorias, a 2020 biographical film revolving around the life of Gloria Steinem, directed by Julie Taymor. She also starred in the second season of The Politician after previously guest starring in the first.

Midler has written several books, including The Saga of Baby Divine and A View from a Broad. She published the children's book The Tale of the Mandarin Duck in 2020, based on the 2018 story of a rare duck spotted in Central Park. She played Miriam Nessler, a retired teacher from New York, in HBO's Coastal Elites by Paul Rudnick.

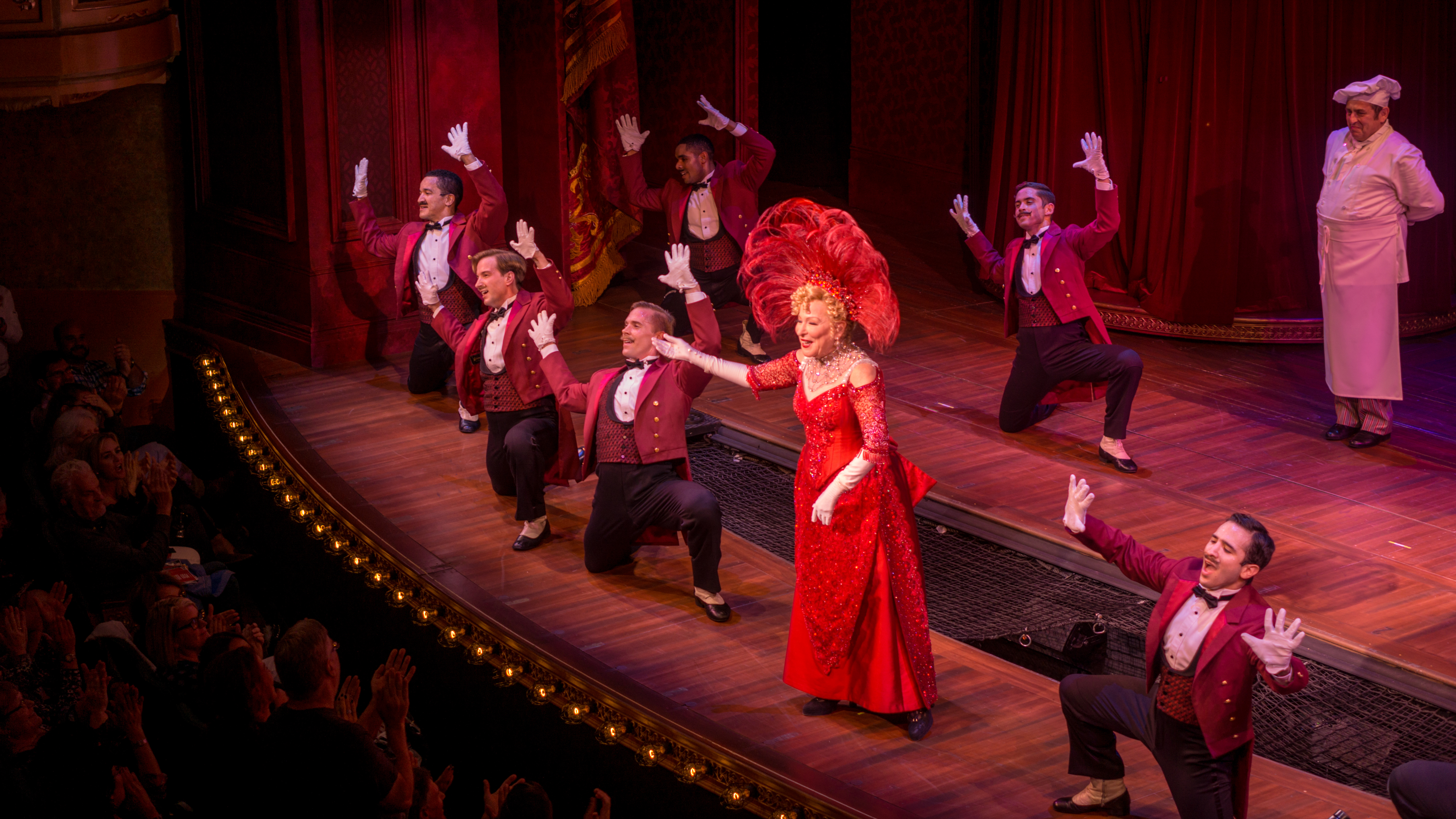
Midler performing the titular song in Hello, Dolly! on Broadway in 2017

Midler received the Kennedy Center Honor for a lifetime of achievement in the performing arts, with the medallion ceremony held at the Library of Congress on December 4, 2021. She attended the gala performance at the Kennedy Center the following day. Later that month, Midler came under fire when criticizing Joe Manchin for not supporting Joe Biden's Build Back Better Plan. While criticizing Manchin, Midler also criticized the State of West Virginia with a tweet where Midler stated, "What #JoeManchin, who represents a population smaller than Brooklyn, has done to the rest of America, who wants to move forward, not backward, like his state, is horrible. He sold us out. He wants us all to be just like his state, West Virginia. Poor, illiterate and strung out." She later apologized for the remarks.

Midler reprised her role as Winifred Sanderson in Hocus Pocus 2 for Disney+ in October 2022. In 2023, she starred in the comedy-drama film Sitting in Bars with Cake.

== Personal life ==
Midler's eldest sibling, Judith (1942–1968), died on December 22, 1968, when a car struck her while she was walking along West 44th Street in New York City. Midler married artist Martin von Haselberg on December 16, 1984. Their daughter, actress Sophie von Haselberg, was born November 14, 1986.

== Charitable work ==
In 1991, Midler was an early sponsor of the Adopt-a-Highway, paying $2,000 a month for a crew to clean up a 2 miles (3.2 km) section of the Ventura Freeway in Burbank, California. Signs at both ends of the section read "Litter Removal Next 2 Miles, Bette Midler." The location was so prominent that it became fodder for her 1993 guest appearance on the Simpsons episode "Krusty Gets Kancelled", where she is seen picking up trash along a stretch of highway she has adopted and causes car crashes for drivers who deliberately litter. In 1995, she carried the same idea to the east coast, adopting a section of the Long Island Expressway and Bronx River Parkway.

Midler founded the New York Restoration Project (NYRP) in 1995, a non-profit organization with the goal of revitalizing neglected neighborhood parks in economically disadvantaged neighborhoods of New York City. These include Highbridge Park, Fort Washington Park, and Fort Tryon Park in upper Manhattan and Roberto Clemente State Park and Bridge Park in the Bronx.

When the city planned in 1991 to auction 114 community gardens for commercial development, Midler led a coalition of green organizations to save them. NYRP took ownership of 60 of the most neglected plots. Since then, Midler and her organization have worked with local volunteers and community groups to ensure that these gardens are kept safe, clean and vibrant. In 2003, Midler opened Swindler Cove Park, a new 5-acre (20,000 m^{2}) public park on the Harlem River shore featuring specially designed educational facilities and the Peter Jay Sharp Boathouse, the first community rowing facility to be built on the Harlem River in more than 100 years. The organization offers free in-school and after-school environmental education programming to students from high-poverty Title I schools.

In 2001 after 9/11, she established programs run by her foundation which help wounded service members and their families by providing them resources, including custom homes. One of these initiatives supports service members during their recovery from trauma, injury, and bereavement. Also, since the first Gulf War she visits the USO and military bases to show her gratitude to service members by serving them meals just before deployment.

Bette Midler pledged to match Pink with a donation of $500,000 to help Australia during the wildfires in 2020.

In 2026, Midler was awarded the Woody Guthrie Prize for her "advocacy work for causes like environmental conservation, public spaces, LGBTQ+ rights, public health initiatives and a number of humanitarian causes."

== Filmography ==
=== Film ===
| Year | Title | Role | Notes |
|---|---|---|---|
| 1966 | Hawaii | Passenger | Uncredited |
| 1968 | The Detective | Girl at Party | Uncredited |
| 1969 | Goodbye, Columbus | Wedding Guest | Uncredited |
| 1971 | The Thorn | Virgin Mary | Also known as The Divine Mr. J |
| 1972 | Scarecrow in a Garden of Cucumbers | Lullabye Singer (voice) | |
| 1979 | The Rose | Mary Rose Foster | |
| 1980 | Divine Madness | Herself / Divine Miss M. | Concert film |
| 1982 | Jinxed! | Bonita Friml | |
| 1986 | Women in Rock | Herself | Documentary |
| 1986 | Down and Out in Beverly Hills | Barbara Whiteman | |
| 1986 | Ruthless People | Barbara Stone | |
| 1987 | Outrageous Fortune | Sandy Brozinsky | |
| 1988 | Big Business | Sadie Shelton / Sadie Ratliff | |
| 1988 | Oliver & Company | Georgette (voice) | |
| 1988 | Beaches | C. C. Bloom | Also producer |
| 1989 | The Lottery | Music Teacher | Short subject |
| 1990 | Stella | Stella Claire | |
| 1991 | Scenes from a Mall | Deborah Fifer | |
| 1991 | For the Boys | Dixie Leonard | Also producer |
| 1992 | Earth and the American Dream | Reader (voice) | Documentary |
| 1993 | Hocus Pocus | Winifred 'Winnie' Sanderson | |
| 1994 | A Century of Cinema | Herself | Documentary |
| 1995 | Get Shorty | Doris Saphron | Uncredited |
| 1996 | The First Wives Club | Brenda Cushman | |
| 1997 | That Old Feeling | Lilly Leonard | |
| 1999 | Get Bruce | Herself | Documentary |
| 1999 | Fantasia 2000 | Herself / hostess | Segment: "Piano Concerto No. 2, Allegro, Opus 102" |
| 2000 | Drowning Mona | Mona Dearly | |
| 2000 | Isn't She Great | Jacqueline Susann | |
| 2000 | What Women Want | Dr. J.M. Perkins | Uncredited |
| 2002 | Divine Secrets of the Ya-Ya Sisterhood | —N/a | Producer only |
| 2004 | The Stepford Wives | Bobbie Markowitz | |
| 2005 | The Divine Bette Midler | Herself | Documentary |
| 2007 | Then She Found Me | Bernice Graves | |
| 2008 | The Women | Leah Miller | |
| 2010 | Cats & Dogs: The Revenge of Kitty Galore | Kitty Galore (voice) | |
| 2012 | Casting By | Herself | Documentary |
| 2012 | Parental Guidance | Diane Decker | |
| 2013 | 20 Feet from Stardom | Herself | Documentary |
| 2017 | Freak Show | Muv | |
| 2019 | The Addams Family | Grandmama (voice) | |
| 2020 | The Glorias | Bella Abzug | |
| 2021 | The Addams Family 2 | Grandmama (voice) | |
| 2022 | Lucy and Desi | Herself | Documentary |
| 2022 | Hocus Pocus 2 | Winifred 'Winnie' Sanderson | |
| 2023 | Sitting in Bars with Cake | Benita | |
| 2024 | The Fabulous Four | Marilyn | |
| 2026 | Steps | Fairy Godmother (voice) | Post-production |
| TBA | Cut Off | TBA | Post-production |

=== Television ===
| Year | Title | Role | Notes |
|---|---|---|---|
| 1970–1992 | The Tonight Show Starring Johnny Carson | Herself | 11 episodes |
| 1975 | Cher | Herself | Episode: "#1.1" |
| 1976 | Vegetable Soup | Woody the Spoon (voice) | Unknown episodes |
| 1976 | The Bette Midler Show | Herself | Television special |
| 1977 | Ol' Red Hair is Back | Herself | Television special |
| 1977 | Bing! A 50th Anniversary Gala | Herself | Television special |
| 1977 | Rolling Stone Magazine: The 10th Anniversary | Herself | Television special |
| 1979 | Saturday Night Live | Herself | Episode: "Buck Henry/Bette Midler"; Sings "Married Men" / "My Knight In Black Leather" |
| 1984 | A Celebration of Life: A Tribute to Martin Luther King, Jr. | Herself | Television special |
| 1984 | Superstars of Comedy Salute the Improv | Herself | Television special |
| 1984 | Art or Bust | Herself / Divine Miss M. | Television special |
| 1984 | MTV Video Music Awards | Herself / co-host | Television special |
| 1988 | The Mondo Beyondo Show | Mondo Beyondo | Television special |
| 1988 | Mickey's 60th Birthday | Herself | Television special |
| 1990 | Sinatra 75: The Best Is Yet to Come | Herself | Television special |
| 1990 | The Earth Day Special | Mother Nature | Television special |
| 1991 | Walt Disney World's 20th Anniversary Celebration | Herself | Television special |
| 1992 | Shelley Duvall's Bedtime Stories | Narrator (voice) | Episode: "Weird Parents" |
| 1993 | Gypsy | Rose Hovick | Television film |
| 1993 | The Simpsons | Herself (voice) | Episode: "Krusty Gets Kancelled" |
| 1995 | Seinfeld | Herself | Episode: "The Understudy" |
| 1997 | Diva Las Vegas | Herself / Divine Miss M. | Television special; also executive producer |
| 1997 | The Nanny | Herself | Episode: "You Bette Your Life" |
| 1998, 2018 | Murphy Brown | Caprice Morton (née Feldman) | 2 episodes |
| 1999 | Jackie's Back | Herself | Television film |
| 2000–2001 | Bette | Bette | 18 episodes; also executive producer |
| 2001 | Crossover | Herself | Television special |
| 2003 | A Barry Manilow Christmas: Live by Request | Herself | Television special |
| 2006–2007 | American Masters | Herself / narrator | 2 episodes |
| 2009 | The Magic 7 | Herself | Television film |
| 2009 | Loose Women | Herself / Guest Host | Episode: "#13.107" |
| 2009 | The Royal Variety Performance | Herself | Television special |
| 2009 | The Marriage Ref | Herself | Episode: "Episode Eleven" |
| 2009 | Kathy Griffin: My Life on the D-List | Herself | Episode: "Place Your Bette" |
| 2010 | The Showgirl Must Go On | Herself | Television special; also director and producer |
| 2010 | Paul O'Grady's Christmas | Herself | Television special |
| 2013 | Project Runway | Herself / Guest Judge | Episode: "The Ultimate Hard and Soft" |
| 2014 | Inside Comedy | Herself | Episode: "Bette Midler & Richard Belzer" |
| 2014 | Bette Midler: One Night Only | Herself | Television special |
| 2016 | The Voice | Herself / Adviser | 6 episodes |
| 2018 | The Hocus Pocus 25th Anniversary Halloween Bash | Herself / Winifred Sanderson | Television special |
| 2019–2020 | The Politician | Hadassah Gold | 8 episodes |
| 2020 | Saturday Night Seder | Herself | Television special |
| 2020 | Coastal Elites | Miriam Nessler | Television film |

== Stage ==
| Year | Title | Role | Notes |
|---|---|---|---|
| 1967 | Fiddler on the Roof | Tzeitel | Broadway |
| 1970 | Salvation | Betty Lou | Off-Broadway |
| 1973 | Bette Midler | Herself | Concerts |
| 1975 | Bette Midler's Clams on the Half Shell Revue | Herself | Revue |
| 1979 | Bette! Divine Madness | Herself | Concerts |
| 2002 | Short Talks on the Universe | Nora | Special event |
| 2011 | Priscilla, Queen of the Desert | Producer | Broadway |
| 2013 | I'll Eat You Last: A Chat with Sue Mengers | Sue Mengers | Broadway |
| 2017–2018 | Hello, Dolly! | Dolly Gallagher Levi | Broadway |

== Discography ==
- The Divine Miss M (1972)
- Bette Midler (1973)
- Songs for the New Depression (1976)
- Broken Blossom (1977)
- Thighs and Whispers (1979)
- No Frills (1983)
- Some People's Lives (1990)
- Bette of Roses (1995)
- Bathhouse Betty (1998)
- Bette (2000)
- Bette Midler Sings the Rosemary Clooney Songbook (2003)
- Bette Midler Sings the Peggy Lee Songbook (2005)
- Cool Yule (2006)
- It's the Girls! (2014)

== Tours ==
- 1970–1972: Continental Baths Tour
- 1972: Cross Country Tour
- 1973: The Divine Miss M Tour
- 1975: Clams on the Half Shell Revue
- 1975–1976: The Depression Tour
- 1977–1978: An Intimate Evening with Bette
- 1978: The Rose Live in Concert
- 1978: World Tour
- 1979–1980: Bette! Divine Madness
- 1980: Divine Madness: Pasadena
- 1982–1983: De Tour
- 1993: Experience the Divine
- 1994: Experience the Divine Again!
- 1997: Diva Las Vegas
- 1999: Bathhouse Betty Club Tour
- 1999–2000: The Divine Miss Millennium Tour
- 2003–2004: Kiss My Brass
- 2005: Kiss My Brass Down Under
- 2008–2010: The Showgirl Must Go On
- 2015: Divine Intervention Tour

== Awards and nominations ==
Midler has received numerous accolades throughout her career. She is one of few artists to have been nominated for an Emmy, a Grammy, an Oscar, and a Tony (EGOT), of which she has won all but the Oscar. Her wins include three Emmys, three Grammys, two Tonys, a Drama Desk Award, four Golden Globe Awards, and a National Board of Review Award.

The Academy of Motion Picture Arts & Sciences (AMPAS) has honored Midler twice with Academy Award nominations, for the following performances

- 52nd Academy Awards: Best Actress in a Leading Role, for The Rose (1979)
- 64th Academy Awards: Best Actress in a Leading Role, for For the Boys (1991)

Both of the above performances also won her the Golden Globe Award for Best Actress, while the first also earned her a nomination for the BAFTA Award for Best Actress in a Leading Role. Her other two Golden Globes were for Best New Female Star of the Year for The Rose and Best Actress in a Miniseries or Television Film for Gypsy (1993).

== Bibliography ==
- Bette Midler: A View from a Broad (Simon & Schuster, 1980; Updated edition April 1, 2014).
- The Saga of Baby Divine (Crown Publishers, 1983).
- The Tale of the Mandarin Duck: A Modern Fable (Random House, 2021).

== See also ==
- List of number-one hits (United States)
- List of artists who reached number one on the Hot 100 (U.S.)
- List of number-one dance hits (United States)
- List of artists who reached number one on the U.S. Dance chart
- Midler v. Ford Motor Co.
