= I'll Eat You Last: A Chat with Sue Mengers =

2013 play by John Logan

- Original language: English
- Written by: John Logan
- Characters: Sue Mengers
- Subject: Sue Mengers; Hollywood
- Genre: biographical

Premiere
- Date: 24 April 2013
- Place: Booth Theatre, New York

I'll Eat You Last: A Chat with Sue Mengers is a 2013 American one-act play by John Logan, about the talent agent Sue Mengers.

== Productions ==
The debut 2013 American production starred Bette Midler. The play, which cost $2.4 million to produce, was a hit.

The Australian premiere of the play was a new Melbourne Theatre Company production in October 2014, starring Miriam Margolyes as Mengers and directed by Dean Bryant.

== Chinatown controversy ==
In the play, Mengers claims that Jane Fonda turned down the role of Evelyn in the 1974 film Chinatown, which ended up being a defining role for Faye Dunaway. In 2013, Fonda responded by saying that director Roman Polanski had never really offered her the part, and that it was written for Dunaway.
