= Cool Yule =

Studio album by Bette Midler
- Released: October 10, 2006
- Genre: Christmas
- Length: 37:23
- Label: Columbia
- Producer: Robbie Buchanan; Jay Landers (exec.)

Bette Midler chronology
Sings the Peggy Lee Songbook (2005)	Cool Yule (2006)	Jackpot: The Best Bette (2008)

Singles from Cool Yule
- 1. "From a Distance (Christmas version)"

Cool Yule is a holiday album by American singer Bette Midler. It was released on October 10, 2006, through Columbia Records. The album features many standard Christmas tunes as well as a reworking edition of her hit "From a Distance". In 2008, Cool Yule was nominated for a Grammy Award in the Best Traditional Pop Vocal Album category.

== Critical reception ==
Professional ratings
Review scores
Source	Rating
AllMusic	3.5/5 stars

AllMusic editor Marisa Brown found that "the Divine Miss M shows off her stuff (including a very able backing band/orchestra) on all the tracks [...] and sounds good the whole time. Because she doesn't add much to the songs that hasn't already been done before, Cool Yule may not replace anyone's [duet partner] Johnny Mathis holiday albums yet, but it's still a pretty strong collection of well-done Christmas standards from a well-known and popular artist."

== Chart performance ==
Cool Yule failed to chart upon its October 10, 2006 release. It was not until November 25, 2006, the album made its debut on the US Billboard 200. It peaked in the week of December 6, 2006, rising from number 35 to number 33 on sales of 47,000 copies. By July 2007, Cool Yule had sold 271,000 copies in United States according to Nielsen Soundscan.

== Track listing ==
All tracks produced by Robbie Buchanan.

Cool Yule track listing
No.	Title	Writer(s)	Length
1.	"Merry Christmas"	Fred Spielman; Janice Torre	3:13
2.	"Cool Yule"	Steve Allen; Eric Kornfeld	2:28
3.	"Have Yourself a Merry Little Christmas"	Ralph Blane; Hugh Martin	3:35
4.	"Winter Wonderland"/"Let It Snow! Let It Snow! Let It Snow!" (duet with Johnny Mathis)	Felix Bernard; Richard B. Smith; Sammy Cahn; Jule Styne	2:46
5.	"I'll Be Home for Christmas"	Kim Gannon; Walter Kent	3:21
6.	"What Are You Doing New Year's Eve?"	Frank Loesser	3:58
7.	"I've Got My Love to Keep Me Warm"	Irving Berlin	3:25
8.	"I Heard the Bells on Christmas Day^{[a]}"	Henry Wadsworth Longfellow; Johnny Marks	2:47
9.	"O Come, O Come, Emmanuel (Veni, Veni Emmanuel)"	Traditional	3:12
10.	"Mele Kalikimaka"	Robert Alexander Anderson	2:34
11.	"From a Distance (Christmas Version)"	Julie Gold; Jay Landers	5:11
12.	"White Christmas"	Berlin	3:20

Notes

- ^{^[a]} "I Heard the Bells on Christmas Day" served as a bonus track on CD albums released at Target.

== Personnel ==
- Christopher Autopchuk – art direction
- Rick Babtist – trumpet
- William Baker – copyist
- Russell Bartmus – copyist
- Leanne Becknell – woodwind
- Steve Becknell – French horn
- Tom Bender – mixing assistant
- Gordon Berg – copyist
- Wayne Bergeron – trumpet
- Charles Bisharat – violin
- David Blumberg – conductor, orchestral arrangements, copyist
- Chandler Bridges – engineer
- Robbie Buchanan – piano, arranger, conductor, keyboards, producer, orchestration, orchestral arrangements, track arrangement
- Caroline Campbell – violin
- Darius Campo – violin
- Dave Carpenter – upright bass
- Lily Chen – violin
- Paul Cohen – cello
- Vinnie Colaiuta – drums
- Dennis Collins – background vocals
- Larry Corbett – cello
- Rose Corrigan – woodwind
- Datz Pyle, Debbi – contractor
- Brian Dembow – viola
- Joel Derouin – violin
- Andrew Duckles – viola
- Bruce Dukov – concert master
- Katharine Edmonds – copyist
- Bill Edwards – copyist
- Johnson Enos – background vocals, vocal arrangement
- Tabitha Fair – background vocals
- Alma Fernandez – viola
- Gary Foster – woodwind
- Matt Funes – viola
- Steve Genewick – digital editing
- Mark Graham – copyist
- Alan Grunfeld – violin
- Mick Guzauski – mixing
- Al Hershberger – violin
- Dan Higgins – woodwind
- Sean Holt – background vocals
- Stephen Holtman – trombone
- Greg Huckins – woodwind
- Alexander Iles – trombone
- Bob Jackson – mastering assistant
- Sharon Jerry-Collins – background vocals
- Bashiri Johnson – percussion
- JoAnn Kane – copyist
- Ana Landauer – violin
- Jay Landers – liner notes, executive producer
- Natalie Leggett – violin
- Gayle Levant – harp
- Bill Liston – woodwind
- Dane Little – cello
- Doug Livingston – steel guitar
- Bob Ludwig – mastering
- Warren Luening – trumpet
- Larry Lunetta – trumpet
- Barry Manilow – producer
- Arif Mardin – orchestral arrangements
- Andy Martin – trombone
- Liane Mautner – violin
- Joe Meyer – French horn
- Jaclyn Morse – production coordination
- Helen Nightengale – violin
- Robin Olson – violin
- Michael O'Neill – photography
- Charles Paakkari – assistant engineer
- Sid Page – violin
- Alyssa Park – violin
- Searmi Park – violin
- Sara Parkins – violin
- Dean Parks – guitar
- Danny Perito – copyist
- Victor Pesavento – copyist
- Joel Peskin – woodwind
- Bill Reichenbach Jr. – trombone
- John A. Reynolds – French horn
- Eric Rigler – Uilleann pipes, Irish whistle
- Dennis Rivadeneira – mixing assistant
- William Ross – arranger, conductor, orchestration, orchestral arrangements, track arrangement
- Aaron J. Sala – background vocals, vocal arrangement
- Chris Soper – assistant engineer
- Ken Stacey – background vocals
- Tereza Stanislav – violin
- Beverley Staunton – background vocals
- Bette Sussman – background vocals, associate producer, vocal arrangement, track arrangement
- Phil Teele – trombone
- Fonzi Thornton – background vocals
- Cecilia Tsan – cello
- Jonathan Tunick – arranger, conductor, orchestration
- Karen Van Sant – viola
- Josephina Vergara – violin
- Shalini Vijayan – violin
- Windy Wagner – background vocals
- Randy Waldman – piano, keyboards
- Helen Barbara Werling – copyist
- Patrick Williams – arranger, conductor, orchestration, vocal arrangement, orchestral arrangements, track arrangement
- Frank Wolf – track engineer
- Terry Woodson – librarian, copyist
- Phil Yao – French horn
- Gina Zimmitti – contractor

== Charts ==
Chart performance for Cool Yule
Chart (2009)	Peak position
US Top Holiday Albums (Billboard)	6
US Digital Albums (Billboard)	13
US Billboard 200	33
