= Diva Las Vegas =

Album by Bette Midler

- Concert by Bette Midler
- Location: MGM Grand Garden Arena (Paradise, Nevada)
- Date(s): 18 January 1997
- No. of shows: 1

Bette Midler concert chronology
- Experience the Divine Again! (1994); Diva Las Vegas (1997); Bathhouse Betty Club Tour (1999)

Diva Las Vegas was a show at the MGM Grand Garden Arena in Las Vegas starring Bette Midler performing as singer and comedian. The one-time performance was filmed for television; HBO released it as a TV special originally broadcast on 18 January 1997 and repeated on 2 February 1997. Midler won the 1997 Primetime Emmy Award for Individual Performance in a Variety or Music Program for the special.

Among the songs performed were "The Rose", "Boogie Woogie Bugle Boy", "From a Distance", "Friends", "Wind Beneath My Wings", "Stay with Me" and "Do You Want to Dance?".

Bette's daughter Sophie von Haselberg appeared for a short time during the song "Ukulele Lady". She sat with the rest of the cast and musicians on stage playing a ukulele and singing the words.

== Personnel ==
=== Cast ===
- Bette Midler – herself, headliner, vocalist

=== Dancers ===
- Michelle Foreman
- Wendy Pasquale
- Karen Russell
- Natalie Webb

=== Musicians ===
- Bobby Lyle – piano and keyboards
- Buzz Feiten – guitar
- Danny Jacob – guitar
- Reggie Hamilton – bass
- Larry Cohn – keyboards
- Rayford Griffin – drums
- Lenny Castro – percussion
- Lynn Mabry – vocals
- Carol Hatchett – vocals
- Melanie Taylor – vocals
- Rhae Ann Theriault – vocals
- Marc Shaiman – additional music

=== Crew ===
- Marty Callner – director/producer
- Madalyn Minch – writer
- Bruce Vilanch – writer
- Lon Weyland – writer
- Bonnie Bruckheimer – executive producer
- Toni Basil – choreographer
- Peter Morse – lighting designer
- Troy Okoniewski – editor
- Jeff U'ren – editor
- Robert De Mora – production design/costume design

== Set list ==
The set list is according to the DVD chapter stops (28 in total). The soundtrack to this concert film has a different track listing and is much shorter in length.

1. "Viva Las Vegas"
2. Opening fanfare
3. "Friends"
4. "I Look Good"
5. "Miss Otis Regrets"
6. "Las Vegas"
7. "Spring Can Really Hang You Up the Most"
8. "Bed of Roses"
9. "The First Wives Club"
10. "You Don't Own Me"
11. "The 70's"
12. "The Rose"
13. "Burlesque - Pretty Legs (& Great Big Knockers)"
14. "Burlesque - Rose's Turn"
15. "Las Vegas Interlude"
16. "Drinkin' Again/MacArthur Park/Infomercial/Call Me"
17. "Boogie Woogie Bugle Boy"
18. "Bigotry/Bridge Over Troubled Waters/In the Navy/The Greatest Love of All"
19. "New York, New York"
20. "Ukulele Lady"
21. "From a Distance"
22. "Do You Wanna Dance?"
23. "To Comfort You"
24. "Stay with Me"
25. "Wind Beneath My Wings"
26. "Cast Introductions"
27. "The Glory of Love"
28. Closing credits

== Technical aspects ==
The concert was filmed in full frame (1.33:1) and the sound was recorded in Dolby Surround. On the DVD of this concert film, there are English subtitles and an animated menu screen with scene selections, but there are no bonus materials.

The concert runs for 123 minutes (2 hours and 3 minutes) in total, including credits. The DVD was not rated with an MPAA rating, but some releases are rated with an "M" for mature audiences (undoubtedly due to strong language and sexual innuendos).

To date, the special has not been officially released to home video in the US. A PAL VHS was issued in Europe, followed by a region 2 DVD. Most recently, a PAL DVD for regions 2-6 was included in a 2009 UK reissue of The Best Bette.

== Certifications ==
Region	Certification	Certified units/sales
Australia (ARIA)	2× Platinum	30,000^{^}
^{^} Shipments figures based on certification alone.
