= Stella Dallas (1925 film) =

1925 film

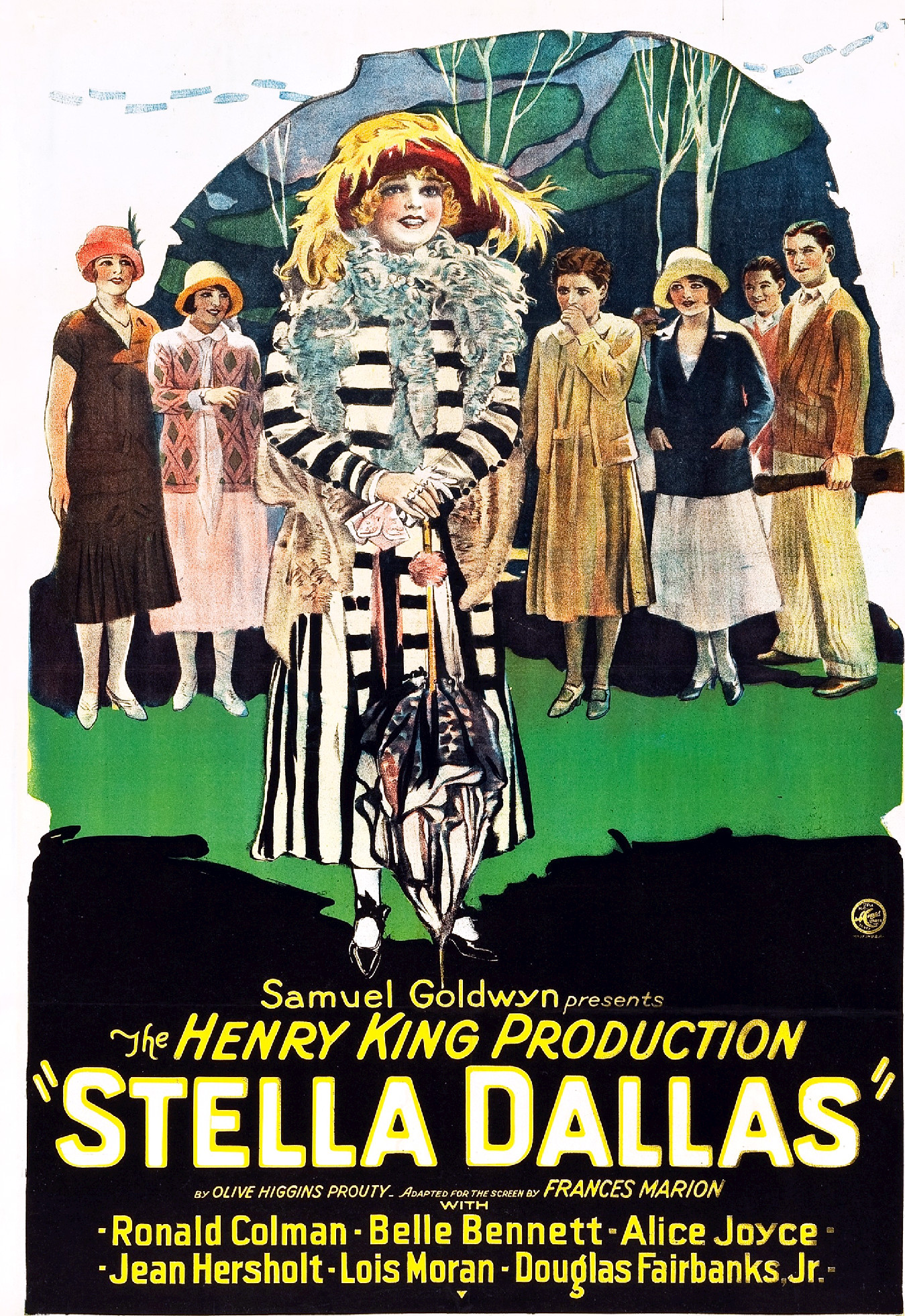
- Theatrical release poster
- Directed by: Henry King
- Written by: Frances Marion
- Based on: Stella Dallas; 1923 novel by Olive Higgins Prouty
- Produced by: Samuel Goldwyn
- Starring: Ronald Colman; Belle Bennett; Lois Moran
- Cinematography: Arthur Edeson
- Edited by: Stuart Heisler
- Production company: Samuel Goldwyn Productions
- Distributed by: United Artists
- Release date: November 16, 1925
- Running time: 110 minutes
- Country: United States
- Language: Silent (English intertitles)
- Budget: $500,000
- Box office: $1.5 million

Stella Dallas (1925)

Stella Dallas is a 1925 American silent drama film that was produced by Samuel Goldwyn, adapted by Frances Marion, and directed by Henry King. The film stars Ronald Colman, Belle Bennett, Lois Moran, Alice Joyce, Jean Hersholt, and Douglas Fairbanks Jr. Prints of the film survive in several film archives.

This was the first feature film adaptation of the 1923 novel Stella Dallas by Olive Higgins Prouty. Subsequent film versions were Stella Dallas (1937) and Stella (1990).

== Plot ==
As described in a review in a 1925 film magazine, upon the suicide of his father who has embezzled funds, Stephen Dallas, reared in luxury, forsakes his sweetheart Helen and hides in a mill town.

Lonely, he succumbs to the blandishments of Stella. For a while, their married life is happy, and a baby girl is born. Stella, however, never rises to Stephen's social level. She dresses gaudily, her ideas and tastes are crude, and her boon companion is a horseman of the coarse type. Stephen finally leaves her but agrees she can keep their child, Laurel.

Years pass. Laurel grows up. Stella comes to the realization that she is a drag on Laurel who takes after her father. Stifling her pride she agrees to a divorce so that Stephen can marry Helen, now a widow, to provide Laurel with a proper home and "mother," but Laurel refuses to leave her own mother. Stella, deciding that no sacrifice is too great for her daughter's happiness, hunts for her friend Ed, now a drunkard, and tells Laurel she is going to marry him. She sends her to visit her father and claims that she and Ed are going away for a year.

Laurel resumes her romance with a fine young fellow and marries him, and Stella in the rain outside watches the ceremony and leaves weeping but happy that her sacrifice has not been in vain.

== Cast ==
- Ronald Colman as Stephen Dallas
- Belle Bennett as Stella Dallas
- Alice Joyce as Helen Morrison
- Jean Hersholt as Ed Munn
- Beatrix Pryor as Mrs. Grosvenor
- Lois Moran as Laurel Dallas
- Douglas Fairbanks Jr. as Richard Grosvenor
- Charles Willis Lane as Stephen Dallas Sr.
- Vera Lewis as Mrs. Tibbetts
- Maurice Murphy as Morrison child
- Jack Murphy as Morrison child
- Newton Hall as Morrison child
- Charles Hatton as Morrison child (older)
- Robert W. Gillette as Morrison child (older)
- Winston Miller as Morrison child (older)
