= Stella Dallas (1937 film) =

1937 film by King Vidor

- Original theatrical poster
- Directed by: King Vidor
- Written by: Dramatization; Harry Wagstaff Gribble; Gertrude Purcell; Screenplay; Sarah Y. Mason; Victor Heerman; Joe Bigelow (uncredited)
- Based on: Stella Dallas by Olive Higgins Prouty
- Produced by: Samuel Goldwyn
- Starring: Barbara Stanwyck; John Boles; Anne Shirley
- Cinematography: Rudolph Maté
- Edited by: Sherman Todd
- Music by: Alfred Newman
- Production company: Samuel Goldwyn Productions
- Distributed by: United Artists
- Release date: August 6, 1937
- Running time: 106 minutes
- Country: United States
- Language: English
- Box office: $2 million (U.S. and Canada rentals)

Stella Dallas is a 1937 American melodrama film based on Olive Higgins Prouty's 1923 novel of the same name. It was directed by King Vidor and stars Barbara Stanwyck, John Boles, and Anne Shirley. At the 10th Academy Awards, Stanwyck and Shirley were nominated for Best Actress and Best Supporting Actress, respectively.

The film is the second of three film adaptations of Prouty's novel: it was preceded by a silent film of the same name in 1925, and followed by Stella in 1990. In February 2020, the film was shown at the 70th Berlin International Film Festival as part of a retrospective of Vidor's career.

== Plot ==
In 1919, in a Massachusetts factory town, Stella Martin, the daughter of a mill worker, is determined to improve her social standing. She sets her sights on Stephen Dallas, the advertising manager at the mill, encountering him at a moment of emotional vulnerability. Stephen’s father has committed suicide after losing the family fortune, leaving Stephen penniless. He withdraws from high society, intending to return to his fiancée, Helen Morrison, once he is financially secure, but just as he feels he has reestablished himself, he sees a newspaper announcement of Helen’s marriage. In the aftermath, Stephen and Stella enter a brief courtship and impulsively marry.

A year later, their daughter Laurel is born. To Stella’s surprise, motherhood awakens a strong maternal instinct. Even while dancing and socializing, she constantly thinks about her child. As Laurel grows, Stella’s ambitions shift from herself to her daughter’s future.

Stephen is devoted to Laurel, but she remains the only bond between husband and wife. He unsuccessfully tries to refine Stella’s manners and disapproves of her continued association with the coarse Ed Munn. When Stephen is offered a promotion requiring a move to New York, Stella urges him to accept, though she and Laurel remain behind. The couple separate but do not divorce, and Laurel sees Stephen only during visits or on vacations.

Years later, Stephen encounters Helen again, now a wealthy widow with three sons. They renew their acquaintance, and Stephen brings Laurel to stay at Helen’s mansion for a vacation. Laurel quickly grows close to Helen and her sons. Stephen then asks Stella, through his lawyer, for a divorce, but she refuses.

Stella later takes Laurel to an upscale resort, where Laurel meets Richard Grosvenor III, and the two fall in love. After recovering from a mild illness, Stella appears in public and becomes the subject of ridicule for her vulgar fashion. Embarrassed for her mother, Laurel insists they leave immediately without explanation. On the train home, Stella overhears other guests discussing her and learns the truth.

After meeting with Helen and observing her elegance, Stella agrees to divorce Stephen and asks whether Laurel can live with Helen and Stephen once they marry. Helen understands Stella’s sacrifice and agrees. When Laurel learns of the plan, she realizes her mother’s intentions and returns home. Stella, however, pretends she wants to be rid of Laurel so she can marry Ed and travel to South America, prompting the devastated Laurel to return to her father and Helen.

Some time later, Laurel and Richard prepare to marry. On her wedding day, Laurel is distressed that her mother has not sent even a letter of congratulations. Helen reassures her by suggesting Stella may not have received the news. Meanwhile, Stella stands outside in the rain, watching the ceremony through a window. Unnoticed among the onlookers, she observes her daughter’s wedding. After being turned away by a police officer, Stella leaves with her head held high and a faint smile on her tear-streaked face.

== Cast ==
- Barbara Stanwyck as Stella Dallas (née Martin)
- John Boles as Stephen Dallas
- Anne Shirley as Laurel Dallas, Stella and Stephen's daughter
- Barbara O'Neil as Helen Morrison (later Dallas)
- Alan Hale as Ed Munn, Stella's friend
- Marjorie Main as Mrs. Martin, Stella's mother
- George Walcott as Charlie Martin, Stella's brother
- Ann Shoemaker as Miss Phillibrown, Laurel's teacher
- Tim Holt as Richard Grosvenor III, Laurel's boyfriend
- Nella Walker as Mrs. Grosvenor, Richard's mother
- Bruce Satterlee as Con Morrison, Helen's eldest son
  - Jimmy Butler as Con Morrison (grown up)
- Jack Egger as John Morrison, Helen's middle son
- Dick Jones as Lee Morrison, Helen's youngest son

=== Uncredited ===
- Edmund Elton as Mr. Martin, Stella's father
- Charles Richman as Stephen Dallas Sr., suicide victim
- Olin Howland as Stephen's office clerk
- Harlan Briggs as Mr. Beamer, Stephen's boss
- Mildred Gover as Agnes, Stella's first maid
- George Meeker as Spencer Chandler, a well-known citizen of Millhampton
- Gertrude Short as Carrie Jenkins, Stella's friend
- Etta McDaniel as Edna, Stella's second maid
- Lillian Yarbo as Gladys, Stella's third maid
- Paul Stanton as Arthur W. Morley, Stephen's lawyer
- Edwin Stanley as Helen's butler
- Jessie Arnold as Ed's landlady
- Robert Homans as the policeman outside the wedding

== Production ==
Tim Holt, the son of Jack Holt, had his first proper role in a film with Stella Dallas. He played the same part that was performed by Douglas Fairbanks Jr., also the son of a film star, in the 1925 version of the film.

== Reception ==
=== Critical response ===
The movie premiered at the Radio City Music Hall, and in a contemporary review for The New York Times, critic Frank S. Nugent wrote that the character of Stella Dallas, first portrayed on the screen 12 years earlier, was outdated, but that the film's theme of motherly love endured: "[W]e cannot accept Stella Dallas in 1937. She is a caricature all the way. ... Stella, through the years, was changeless, but, where her daughter was concerned, she was eternal: the selfless mother." Nugent praised Stanwyck's performance, saying: "Miss Stanwyck's portrayal is as courageous as it is fine. Ignoring the flattery of make-up man and camera, she plays Stella as Mrs. Prouty drew her—coarse, cheap, common ... And yet magnificent as a mother."

Photoplay offered the opinion that this was a rare example in which the effort of remaking a silent film was justified by the quality of the new production and described it as a "major screen achievement". Praise was given for the "restraint" in King Vidor’s direction which resulted in "near perfect cinema". Of the performances, the reviewer commented that Barbara Stanwyck "is superbly suited in her role", Anne Shirley "in view of her past minor performances, shows surprising ability", John Boles and Alan Hale "are exceptional", Barbara O’Neil "brings grace and dignity" and Tim Holt "is a lad to watch".

Modern Screen’s Leo Townsend wrote that the film is "as honest and forthright as it is dramatic and exciting. Stella Dallas ranks as one of the best pictures of the year." He stated that King Vidor elicited "superb performances" and that he deserved "perhaps the lion's share of the credit" for the film's quality. He wrote, "Barbara Stanwyck, who has always been an actress of definite limitations, performs so skillfully in the title role that she is bound to receive serious consideration for this year's Academy Award. Anne Shirley … is almost as good as Miss Stanwyck, and Allan [sic] Hale … turns in a grand comedy portrayal. John Boles … is excellent, and Barbara O'Neill … is both attractive and capable. In addition, there is a splendid bit by Margaret [sic] Main, in the role of Miss Stanwyck's mother".

Harrison's Reports stated that the remake "surpasses" the original film, and described it as a "powerful, emotion-stirring, drama of mother love." Barbara Stanwyck's performance was praised as "superb."

Motion Picture Herald described the film as an "undiluted melodrama" and commended Vidor for drawing strong performances from Stanwyck and Hale, and wrote, "King Vidor allows Miss Stanwyck abundant footage for thorough exercise of her talent. He has been equally generous to Alan Hale, whose assignment it is to portray the gradual and alcoholic decline of an uncouth but constant suitor and friend in need."

Variety praised the film, while mentioning some inconsistencies, such as the fact that Stella and her daughter both wear clothes made by Stella, but the daughter is always dressed in good taste, while the mother is not.

Maclean's criticized the outlandish costumes worn by the title character, but praised the story as relevant for any decade, concluding that "the picture is handled with honesty, restraint and feeling."

On the review aggregator website Rotten Tomatoes, 90% of 10 critics' reviews of the film are positive, with an average rating of 6.9/10.

=== Accolades ===
| Award | Category | Nominee(s) | Result |
|---|---|---|---|
| Academy Awards | Best Actress | Barbara Stanwyck | Nominated |
| Academy Awards | Best Supporting Actress | Anne Shirley | Nominated |

The character Stella Dallas was nominated for inclusion on the American Film Institute's 2003 list AFI's 100 Years...100 Heroes & Villains, and is considered by many as among Stanwyck's signature roles. Japanese filmmaker Akira Kurosawa cited Stella Dallas as one of his favorite films.
