= Bette Midler Sings the Peggy Lee Songbook =

Studio album by Bette Midler
- Released: October 25, 2005
- Studios: O'Henry Sound Studios (Burbank, CA)
- Length: 37:41
- Label: Columbia
- Producer: Barry Manilow

Bette Midler chronology
Sings the Rosemary Clooney Songbook (2003)	Bette Midler Sings the Peggy Lee Songbook (2005)	Cool Yule (2006)

Singles from Sings the Peggy Lee Songbook
- 1. "Fever"

Bette Midler Sings the Peggy Lee Songbook is a studio album by American singer Bette Midler. Produced by Barry Manilow, it serves as a follow-up to their Grammy Award-nominated Bette Midler Sings the Rosemary Clooney Songbook (2003). Released in 2005, the Peggy Lee tribute was Midler's first album produced in the DualDisc format, although the DVD features were limited to a few short video clips; the initial release was affected by Extended Copy Protection technology.

== Promotion ==
The album spawned the single "Fever", a cover version of the 1956 Little Willie John record which was covered by Peggy Lee and whose 1958 rendition became the most widely known version of "Fever" and the singer's signature song. A remix of the song, produced by L.E.X, reached number 4 on the US Billboard Dance Club Songs chart in 2006.

== Critical reception ==
Professional ratings
Review scores
Source	Rating
AllMusic	3.5/5 stars

AllMusic editor John Bush called the album "a talented, affectionate record that may not add much to the cause but is a solid tribute [...] Midler's studied boredom in the verses is good enough, but when she reaches the uninhibited chorus, she reveals a marvel of catlike glee. The arrangements, most of them by Manilow, are very good, although they reveal a close knowledge of the originals that contributes to the reverence on display." John Anson, writing for the Lancashire Telegraph found that "it's all too easy to forget that as well as a comedian and actress, Miss M is a great blues and big band singer. This collection of songs originally sung by Peggy Lee gives her a chance to remind us of her vocal talents."

== Chart performance ==
Bette Midler Sings the Peggy Lee Songbook debuted and peaked at number ten on the US Billboard 200, selling 55,000 copies in its first week of release. This marked Midler's highest-charting album on the chart since Some People's Lives went to number six in 1991. By October 2006, it had sold 263,000 in the United States.

== Track listing ==
All tracks produced by Barry Manilow, co-produced by David Benson.

Bette Midler Sings the Peggy Lee Songbook track listing
No.	Title	Writer(s)	Length
1.	"Fever"	Eddie Cooley; John Davenport	3:38
2.	"Alright, Okay, You Win"	Mayme Watts; Sid Wyche	4:28
3.	"I Love Being Here with You" (duet with Barry Manilow)	Peggy Lee; Frank Loesser; Bill Schluger	2:46
4.	"Happiness Is a Thing Called Joe"	Harold Arlen; Yip Harburg	4:54
5.	"Is That All There Is?"	Jerry Leiber; Mike Stoller	4:26
6.	"I'm a Woman"	Leiber; Stoller	2:28
7.	"He's a Tramp"	Sonny Burke; Lee	2:39
8.	"The Folks Who Live on the Hill"	Oscar Hammerstein II; Jerome Kern	3:07
9.	"Big Spender"	Cy Coleman; Dorothy Fields	2:18
10.	"Mr. Wonderful"	Jerry Bock; Larry Holofcener; George David Weiss	4:33

Barnes & Noble bonus track
No.	Title	Writer(s)	Length
11.	"He Needs Me"	Arthur Hamilton	4:09

== Charts ==
Chart performance for Bette Midler Sings the Peggy Lee Songbook
Chart (2005)	Peak position
Scottish Albums (Official Charts)	42
UK Albums (Official Charts)	41
US Billboard 200	10
