= Stella (1990 film) =

1990 American drama film directed by John Erman

- Theatrical release poster
- Directed by: John Erman
- Screenplay by: Robert Getchell
- Based on: Stella Dallas; 1923 novel by Olive Higgins Prouty
- Produced by: Samuel Goldwyn Jr.
- Starring: Bette Midler; John Goodman; Trini Alvarado; Stephen Collins; Marsha Mason
- Cinematography: Billy Williams
- Edited by: Jerrold L. Ludwig; Bud Molin
- Music by: John Morris
- Production companies: Touchstone Pictures; The Samuel Goldwyn Company
- Distributed by: Buena Vista Pictures Distribution (North America and United Kingdom); The Samuel Goldwyn Company (International)
- Release date: February 2, 1990
- Running time: 109 minutes
- Country: United States
- Language: English
- Budget: $19 million
- Box office: $20.2 million

Stella is a 1990 American drama film produced by The Samuel Goldwyn Company and released by Touchstone Pictures. The screenplay by Robert Getchell is the third feature film adaptation of the 1923 novel Stella Dallas by Olive Higgins Prouty. Previous film versions were Stella Dallas (1937) and the silent film Stella Dallas (1925).

The title character Stella Claire is an extrovert, flamboyant single mother living in Watertown, New York, who is determined to give her daughter, Jenny, all of the opportunities that she never had, ultimately makes a selfless sacrifice to ensure her happiness. This film version differs from earlier versions in that Stella never marries the father of her child Dr. Stephen Dallas and in fact declines his proposal early in the film.

John Erman directed a cast that included Bette Midler as Stella and Trini Alvarado as Jenny, with John Goodman, Stephen Collins, Marsha Mason, Eileen Brennan, Linda Hart, Ben Stiller, and William McNamara in supporting roles.

== Plot ==
Stella is a feisty woman working in a bar when she meets and falls for the suave charms of the young Dr. Stephen Dallas. Although from opposite ends of the social spectrum, they start an affair that results in Stella becoming pregnant.

After he proposes, she rejects him and embarks upon raising their child, Jenny, as a single mother but is always helped and encouraged by her friend, local barfly Ed Munn. Stella is independent and is determined to provide her child and take on whatever jobs she must to raise her daughter properly.

When Jenny is 4 years old, her father Stephen suddenly reappears on the scene and is determined to get to know his daughter. At first reluctant to allow him, Stella is persuaded to allow contact, and a happy bond develops between the father and daughter.

As Jenny grows up, she becomes torn between her father's rich and well-connected background and her loyalty and love for her mother who is poor and free spirited but devoted to her daughter. She also despises the perceived relationship she sees developing between Stella and Ed, who is now a broken alcoholic. Jenny eventually meets and falls for Pat Robbins, a boy from her father's world. Stella realizes that the disparities in her own and Jenny's father's backgrounds might now jeopardize her daughter's future happiness.

== Cast ==
- Bette Midler as Stella Claire
- John Goodman as Ed Munn
- Trini Alvarado as Jenny Claire
  - Ashley Peldon as Jenny Claire (age 3)
  - Alisan Porter as Jenny Claire (age 8)
- Stephen Collins as Dr. Stephen Dallas
- Marsha Mason as Janice Morrison
- Eileen Brennan as Mrs. Wilkerson
- Linda Hart as Debbie Whitman
- Ben Stiller as Jim Uptegrove
- William McNamara as Pat Robbins

== Production ==
According to John Candy's biography, he was in talks to play Stella Claire's working class love interest Ed Munn. However, when he was informed that Bette Midler demanded he do a screen test, Candy became incredulous proclaiming "who the (expletive) does she think she is?!" and declined. John Goodman was eventually cast in the role.

== Reception ==
On Metacritic the film has a score of 45% based on reviews from 15 critics, indicating "mixed or average reviews". Peter Rainer quipped in his Los Angeles Times review, "Do we really need to be put through another version of Stella Dallas? Is this the vehicle that Bette Midler thinks will reclaim her serious-actress status? If so, she's greatly misunderstood her gifts, which stand in raucous, subversive contrast to everything this sudsy weepie represents. Directed by John Erman, freighted with a musical score of soaring banality, this 20-year saga of an uneducated, working-class single mother who sacrifices everything to give her daughter the chance she never had is so recklessly shameless it verges on camp parody." In The Washington Post, critic Rita Kempley stated: "From bathhouse chanteuse to Lemon Joy diva, from self-proclaimed queen of camp, sass and tactlessness to goddess of suds, sap and pap -- yes, you have come a long way, Baby Divine. Gone is the Bette Midler of Clams on the Half Shell and Ruthless People, the better Midler, and in her place is this new middling piddler." Janet Maslin of The New York Times thought Midler was miscast, but praised her performance saying "Bette Midler, too old for the film's opening and too smart for its resolution, isn't exactly the right actress, but she's a lot closer than might have been expected. Ms. Midler manages to gloss over the story's inconsistencies, play up its charming aspects, and generally bluster her way through . . . her exuberance is most helpful in overshadowing the inconvenient aspects of this story." A far more positive review came from critic Roger Ebert who wrote that "Stella is the kind of movie that works you over and leaves you feeling good, unless you absolutely steel yourself against it. Go to sneer. Stay to weep."

At the 11th Golden Raspberry Awards, Midler was nominated for the Golden Raspberry Award for Worst Actress and Jay Gruska and Paul Gordon were nominated for the Golden Raspberry Award for Worst Original Song ("One More Cheer").

=== Box office ===
Stella debuted at No. 2 in Canada and the United States behind Driving Miss Daisy. Total US gross for the film was $20,240,128.

== Home media ==
The film was issued on VHS on Touchstone Home Video (Cat. #995) on August 29, 1990, and proved more successful on home video. Stella was released on DVD on April 8, 2003. The film was presented in widescreen format, no special features were included.
