= Bette Midler Sings the Rosemary Clooney Songbook =

Studio album by Bette Midler
- Released: September 30, 2003
- Recorded: May 19–23, 2003
- Studio: Sony Music Studios (Culver City, CA); The Hop (Studio City, CA); Schnee Studios (North Hollywood, CA)
- Length: 30:51
- Label: Columbia
- Producer: Barry Manilow; Robbie Buchanan

Bette Midler chronology
Bette (2000)	Bette Midler Sings the Rosemary Clooney Songbook (2003)	Sings the Peggy Lee Songbook (2005)

Singles from Sings the Rosemary Clooney Songbook
- 1. "White Christmas"

Bette Midler Sings the Rosemary Clooney Songbook is a 2003 studio album by the American singer Bette Midler, produced by Barry Manilow, their first collaboration in over two decades. The album was Midler's first for Columbia and Sony Music, after nearly 30 years with Warner Music Group.

Following the June 2002 death of singer Rosemary Clooney, Manilow claims to have had a dream about producing a tribute album with Midler providing vocals. Midler shared in the liner notes: "When Barry approached me ("I had this dream!") about recording an album of Rosemary's standards, I was excited, but apprehensive. I wanted to be respectful, but I felt we had to find something new to say as well, and in these (mostly) new arrangements...I believe we have."

Bette Midler Sings the Rosemary Clooney Songbook peaked at #14 on the Billboard 200 with 71,000 copies sold in its initial week of release, and been certified Gold by the RIAA. The album's success prompted Midler to release a Peggy Lee tribute album in 2005.

== Critical reception ==
Professional ratings
Review scores
Source	Rating
AllMusic	4/5 stars
The Rolling Stone Album Guide	3/5 stars

AllMusic editor Matt Collar rated the album four stars out of five. He found that "Midler's plucky blonde persona and genre-crossing style and Manilow's modern day blend of Mercer and Porter make this album work – most of the time [...] Midler – who can carry a tune on personality alone – sounds elegant and alive here and Manilow's classy orchestral arrangements frame the proceedings with the urbane glow of nostalgia for a time – be it the '50s or the '70s – when a big band, a great song, and blonde with a nice voice were all you needed for a good time."

== Track listing ==
1. "You'll Never Know" (Mack Gordon, Harry Warren) – 1:44
2. "This Ole House" (Stuart Hamblen) – 3:02
3. "On a Slow Boat to China" (Frank Loesser) – 2:31 – Duet With Barry Manilow
4. "Hey There" (Richard Adler, Jerry Ross) – 3:30
5. "Tenderly" (Walter Lloyd Gross, Jack Lawrence) – 3:11
6. "Come On-a My House" (Ross Bagdasarian, Sr., William Saroyan) – 1:50
7. "Mambo Italiano" (Bob Merrill) – 2:50
8. "Sisters" (Irving Berlin) – 2:53 – Duet with Linda Ronstadt
9. "Memories of You" (Eubie Blake, Andy Razaf) – 3:20
10. "In the Cool, Cool, Cool of the Evening" (Hoagy Carmichael, Johnny Mercer) – 2:44
11. "White Christmas" (Irving Berlin) – 3:16

== Personnel ==
- Chuck Berghofer – bass guitar
- Kenny Blackwell – mandolin
- Robbie Buchanan – piano
- Jorge Calandrelli – conductor
- Vinnie Colaiuta – drums
- George Doering – guitar
- Ray Ellis – conductor
- Gregg Field – drums
- Barry Manilow – piano
- Bette Midler – vocals
- Dean Parks – guitar
- Herb Pedersen – banjo
- Hans Stamer – background vocals
- Warren Stanyer – background vocals
- Beverly Staunton – background vocals
- David Steele – background vocals
- Michael Thompson – guitar
- Randy Waldman – piano
- Steve Welsh – piano
- Patrick Williams – conductor

== Charts ==
Chart performance for Bette Midler Sings the Rosemary Clooney Songbook
Chart (2003)	Peak position
Australian Albums (ARIA)	28
US Billboard 200	14

== Certifications ==
Certifications for Bette Midler Sings the Peggy Lee Songbook
Region	Certification	Certified units/sales
United States (RIAA)	Gold	500,000^{^}
^{^} Shipments figures based on certification alone.
