= Stella Dallas (novel) =

1923 novel by Olive Higgins Prouty

- Author: Olive Higgins Prouty
- Language: English
- Publisher: Houghton Mifflin
- Publication date: 1923
- OCLC: 286072

Stella Dallas is a 1923 novel by Olive Higgins Prouty and published by Houghton Mifflin, written in response to the death of her three-year-old daughter from encephalitis. It tells the story of the eponymous protagonist, a working-class woman who marries a rich businessman but struggles to adapt to her new life. After the marriage fails, she sacrifices her own happiness for the sake of her daughter.

The novel was subsequently adapted into a stage play in 1924 and movies in 1925, 1937, and 1990. The 1937 King Vidor and Sam Goldwyn production brought Academy Award nominations to Barbara Stanwyck and Anne Shirley. The novel was also the basis for the radio serial Stella Dallas, which aired daily for 18 years as a soap opera. Prouty was reportedly displeased with her characters' portrayals therein.
