= Friends (Bette Midler song) =

Single by Bette Midler

from the album The Divine Miss M
- B-side: "Chapel of Love"
- Released: 1973
- Recorded: 1972
- Studio: Atlantic Recording Studios, New York City
- Genre: Pop rock, vocal
- Length: 2:59
- Label: Atlantic
- Songwriters: Buzzy Linhart; Mark "Moogy" Klingman
- Producers: Ahmet Ertegun, Barry Manilow, Geoffrey Haslam

Bette Midler singles chronology
"Boogie Woogie Bugle Boy" (1972)	"Friends" (1973)	"In the Mood" (1973)

"Friends" (also titled "(You Got to Have) Friends") is a 1973 hit single by Bette Midler. It was written by Buzzy Linhart and Mark "Moogy" Klingman. In the United States, the song reached No. 9 on the Adult Contemporary chart and reached No. 40 on the Billboard Hot 100 chart.

== Background ==
A version of "Friends" was recorded by one of the song's co-writers, Buzzy Linhart. More of a rock sound than a pop sound, Linhart's version had an alternative title, "(You Got to Have) Friends". Bette Midler was one of Linhart's close friends during the early 1970s. While rehearsing for an audition for a Broadway show called Mirror Cracked, Linhart sang to Midler a song that he and his songwriting partner Mark "Moogy" Klingman had just written, called "Friends". After hearing the song, Midler asked Linhart if she could sing "Friends" during a show that she was performing in at the Continental Baths in New York. Klingman and Linhart attended the show and were impressed with the performance. Soon after, Midler recorded the song on her debut album The Divine Miss M.

== Charts ==
Chart (1973)	Peak position
Canada Top Singles (RPM)	57
Canada Adult Contemporary (RPM)	17
US Billboard Hot 100	40
US Adult Contemporary (Billboard)	9
US Cash Box Top 100	40

== In popular culture ==
The song "Friends" can be heard during the final scene and closing credits of the 1973 mystery film The Last of Sheila.

It was covered by Barry Manilow on his 1973 debut album.

The song was also sung by the 1974-75 cast of Zoom during the "ZOOM was presented by" end credits reintroducing the cast members.

Also, the song was performed on The Muppet Show Episode 115 by the Muppets and Candice Bergen, who is the guest star on that episode in 1976.

The song was used as a commercial outro for the unsold Jay Wolpert produced game show pilot called Fast Friends hosted by Bob Goen in 1984.

A cover version of this song is played during a car chase in a Hardcastle and McCormick episode called "Duet for Two Wind Instruments" (Season 3 Episode 12) in 1985.

A rendition of the song is heard on the film Shrek, performed by Donkey, voiced by Eddie Murphy in 2001.
