= Hocus Pocus =

Hocus-pocus is an exclamation used by magicians, usually the magic words spoken when bringing about some sort of change.

Hocus Pocus, Hokus Pokus, or variants may also refer to:

== Books ==
- Hocus Pocus (novel), a 1990 novel by Kurt Vonnegut
- Hocus Pocus: A Tale of Magnificent Magicians, a 2007 book by illusionist Paul Kieve
- Hokus Pokus, the 2007 book in the Sisterhood: Rules of the Game series by Fern Michaels

== Film, television, and plays ==
- Hokuspokus, a 1926 German play by Curt Goetz
  - Hokuspokus (film), a 1930 German film adaptation of the 1926 Curt Goetz play, directed by Gustav Ucicky
  - Hocuspocus (1953 film), a West German film, starring Curt Goetz himself, directed by Kurt Hoffmann
  - Hocuspocus (1966 film), a West German film in color, directed by Kurt Hoffmann
- Hokus Pokus (1949 film), the 115th short subject starring American slapstick comedy team the Three Stooges
- Hocus Pocus, the rabbit who turns on his magician owner, Professor Hinkle in the 1969 Christmas television special Frosty the Snowman
- Hokus Pokus, a 1989 skateboarding video released by H-Street
- Hocus Pocus (franchise)
  - Hocus Pocus (1993 film), a Halloween-themed fantasy-comedy film by Disney, starring Bette Midler, Sarah Jessica Parker, and Kathy Najimy
  - Hocus Pocus 2, the sequel released in 2022
  - Hocus Pocus 3, the third film in the series currently in development at Walt Disney Pictures
- "Hocus Pocus" (SpongeBob SquarePants), a 2007 SpongeBob SquarePants episode from Season 4
- "Hocus Pocus" (QI), a 2010 episode of the UK TV series

== Gaming ==
- Hocus Pocus (video game), a 1994 Apogee MS-DOS game

== Music ==
=== Band ===
- Hocus Pocus, a 1967 music band later known as Heart
- Hocus Pocus, a 1968 music band later known as UFO
- Hocus Pocus, a 1994 music band previously known as Doop
- Hocus Pocus (group), a 1995 French hip-hop group

=== Album ===
- Hocus Pocus (soundtrack), a soundtrack album from the 1993 film
- Hocus Pocus (Enon album), a 2003 indie rock album by Enon
- Hocus Pocus (Kaela Kimura album), a 2009 J-pop album by Kaela Kimura
- Hocus Pocus, a series of albums by Japanese singer Takahiro Nishijima, known professionally as 'Nissy

=== Song ===
- "Hocus Pocus" (song), a 1971 song by the Dutch rock group Focus
- "Hokus Pokus" (song), a 1997 song by Insane Clown Posse
- "Hocus Pocus", a 2016 song by Animal Collective from Painting With

== See also ==
- Sir Hokus of Pokes, a character in the Oz book series
- Griever de Hocus, a character from Griever: An American Monkey King in China
- Point-of-care ultrasound (POCUS)
