= Hocus Pocus 2 (soundtrack) =

Hocus Pocus 2 (Original Soundtrack)

Soundtrack album by John Debney
- Released: September 30, 2022
- Recorded: 2021–2022
- Studios: Sony Scoring Stage, Sony Pictures Studios; Newman Scoring Stage, 20th Century Studios
- Genres: Film score; soundtrack
- Length: 1:08:36
- Label: Walt Disney
- Producer: John Debney

Hocus Pocus chronology
Hocus Pocus (1993)	Hocus Pocus 2 (Original Soundtrack) (2022)

John Debney chronology
Luck (2022)	Hocus Pocus 2 (2022)	80 for Brady (2023)

Hocus Pocus 2 (Original Soundtrack) is the soundtrack album for the 2022 fantasy comedy film Hocus Pocus 2; a sequel to the 1993 film Hocus Pocus. John Debney, who scored for the first film, returned for the sequel in October 2021. The album consisted of 28 tracks: two original songs, seven adapted songs and Debney's score containing the remainder of it. It was digitally released by Walt Disney Records on September 30, 2022 (the same day on the film's Disney+ release), and was followed by a physical release on November 11.

== Production ==
John Debney recalled on scoring Hocus Pocus 2, as a wonderful and emotional experience, and further said "It was quite a wonderful experience It was rather emotional. How often does a composer get to rework material that they wrote so many years ago, to try to make it fresh, and pay respect to its lineage". He archived the original sketches of the score he recorded for Hocus Pocus, and re-recorded them along with the fresh themes he composed for the sequel. He felt it as an interesting education, to replay original cues and worked well with the film, and further Debney said "I've also grown as a composer in different ways. The new material, the new themes for this film, they're for a more contemporary audience that likes darker sounds. It's the encapsulation of new material, the old material, and then the blending of the two, and it worked out really well."

Debney opined that creating darker sounds for the film was akin to the composition for The Sorcerer's Apprentice (2010), that had a magical witchcraft score" from the classical world. While the score for the first film had female choir, he opted for using a solo female vocals, to give a "more personal, almost childlike sound that evokes a much darker palette". On the instrumentation of the film's score, Debney said:

"There are a lot of contemporary techniques – we're using the strings and manipulating them and having them do glissandi, and do trimming things; a lot of tonal things with choir getting tonal textures here and there. I'll let the readers a little bit under the hood: our demos are sounding so good these days that many times my demo sounds bigger than the orchestra. That can be good - and it can be bad. In this case, the orchestra was big-sounding, but I really needed some of the darker colours and basslines of the synthetics to really make it fill up the screen, as it were."

Debney wrote new themes for the Sanderson Sisters, which Debney described it as "sing-songy dark waltz" (Note: a strange melody consisting an octave leap in the tune.) fashioned theme, and added "It's in the lighter moments, sometimes you'll hear it as Sarah's waltz or there's a great scene towards the end of the film when I get a very dark version with the horns and the Wagner tubas." The recording consisted of two sessions held at the Newman Scoring Stage in 20th Century Studios and Sony Scoring Stage, as he felt that "each stage had its own distinct tone"; nearly 80 minutes of orchestral music have been recorded for the film.

== Songs ==
Apart from Debney's score, the album featured two songs performed by Bette Midler, Sarah Jessica Parker and Kathy Najimy, who played the Sanderson Sisters. The first track is titled "The Witches Are Back", a re-written version of the Elton John single, "The Bitch Is Back" (1974), featuring additional lyrics by Midler and Marc Shaiman. The second song titled, "One Way or Another", is a cover of the 1979 single by Blondie. Other tracks include: "Skeleton Sam" by LVCRFT, "Planet Claire" by The B-52's, "Ghosted" by DBone and The Remains, "Afraid of the Night" by DBone and The Remains and Earl St. Clair, "Hocus Pocus Voo Doo" by Big Bob Kornegay, and a remixed version of Rockwell's "Somebody's Watching Me" by The Urban Renewal Project. Some of the tracks, featured in the film and not included in the soundtrack include, "Skate" by Silk Sonic and "Sarah's Theme" (an original song) by Jessica Parker.

== Track listing ==
All tracks are written by John Debney, except where indicated.

No.	Title	Writer(s)	Performer(s)	Length
1.	"Yes Salem, We're Back! (dialogue)"		Bette Midler; Sarah Jessica Parker; Kathy Najimy	0:12
2.	"The Witches Are Back"	Bernie Taupin; Elton John; Bette Midler (additional lyrics); Marc Shaiman (additional lyrics)	Midler; Parker; Najimy	1:44
3.	"Skeleton Sam"	Evan Bogart; Justin Gray; Sarah Elizabeth Barrios	LVCRFT	2:54
4.	"Planet Claire"	Henry Mancini; Fred Schneider; Keith Strickland	The B-52's	4:37
5.	"Ghosted"	Derek "DBone" Reckley; Sandy Chila	DBone and The Remains	2:28
6.	"Somebody's Watching Me – Urban Renewal Project Remix"	Rockwell	Rockwell; The Urban Renewal Project	3:56
7.	"Hocus Pocus Voo Doo"	Bob Kornegay; James Steward	Big Bob Kornegay	2:18
8.	"Afraid of the Night"	Reckley; Earl Johnson; Chila; Timothy Matthew Young	DBone and The Remains; Earl St. Clair	3:00
9.	"One Way or Another (Hocus Pocus 2 Version)"	Debbie Harry; Nigel Douglas Harrison	Midler; Parker; Najimy	2:27
10.	"Salem 1653"			1:32
11.	"Banished Thee"			2:01
12.	"I Don't Have a Temper"			2:49
13.	"Lighting the Black Flame"			1:30
14.	"Sanderson's Storm"			0:55
15.	"Let's Steal Their Souls!"			1:24
16.	"Salt Bags"			1:06
17.	"The Power Spell"			2:28
18.	"Cobweb the Cat/Hourglass"			1:58
19.	"Digging Up Billy"			2:37
20.	"Lift the Curse and Let Us Out"			2:24
21.	"I Need Your Head/Meeting the Mayor"			2:12
22.	"Forbidden Wood"			3:50
23.	"Is Becca a Witch?"			5:21
24.	"Finishing the Spell"			2:15
25.	"Sarah and Mary Disappear"			5:40
26.	"Making Amends with Gilbert"			3:06
27.	"Cobweb Canole"			0:36
28.	"Hocus Pocus Main Theme"			1:16
Total length:				68:36

== Promotion ==
On October 10, 2022, as a Disney+ Night tribute, the track "The Witches Are Back" was performed by Jessie James Decker and Alan Bersten, at the 31st season of Dancing with the Stars. Debney was set to perform the score from the sequel at the live concert tribute to the film, titled Hocus Pocus in Concert. The event was held in London from October 23-28, 2022.

== Reception ==
The musical numbers and Debney's score were highlighted as the positive aspects off the film. Ani Bundel of Elite Daily opined that the songs are "spooky bangers" and are "just begging to be part of your Halloween playlist". Zoe Adams of Heart further added that the songs "make the perfect soundtrack for Halloween".

== Charts ==
Chart performance for Hocus Pocus 2 (Original Motion Picture Soundtrack)
Chart (2022)	Peak position
UK Album Downloads (OCC)	35

== Release history ==
Release dates and formats for Hocus Pocus 2 (Original Motion Picture Soundtrack)
Region	Date	Format(s)	Label	Ref.
Various	September 30, 2022	Digital download; streaming	Walt Disney	
Various	November 11, 2022	CD	Walt Disney	
