= Hocus Pocus (franchise) =

Disney media franchise

- Created by: David Kirschner; Mick Garris
- Original work: Hocus Pocus
- Owner: The Walt Disney Company
- Years: 1993–present

Films and television
- Films: Hocus Pocus (1993); Hocus Pocus 2 (2022); Hocus Pocus 3 (upcoming)
- Short film: Hocus Pocus: As Told by Chibi (2022)
- Television special: Hocus Pocus 25th Anniversary Halloween Bash (2018)

Games
- Video games: Disney Heroes: Battle Mode (2021); Disney Magic Kingdoms (2022)

Audio
- Soundtracks: Hocus Pocus (1993); Hocus Pocus 2 (2022)

Miscellaneous
- Toy: Lego Hocus Pocus
- Theme park attractions: Halloween Screams (2009–present); Hocus Pocus Villain Spelltacular (2015–present)

Hocus Pocus is an American media franchise consisting of two films, a sequel novelization, and other Disney media and merchandise. The series was created by David Kirschner and Mick Garris.

== Films ==
Film	U.S. release date	Director	Screenwriter(s)	Story by	Producer(s)	Release type	Status
Hocus Pocus	July 16, 1993	Kenny Ortega	Mick Garris and Neil Cuthbert	David Kirschner and Mick Garris	David Kirschner and Steven Haft	Theatrical	Released
Hocus Pocus 2	September 30, 2022	Anne Fletcher	Jen D'Angelo	David Kirschner & Blake Harris and Jen D'Angelo	Lynn Harris	Disney+ original	Released

=== Hocus Pocus (1993) ===
300 years ago, in 1693, in Salem, Massachusetts, the Sanderson sisters were hanged by the population of Salem after a boy named Thackery Binx tried to stop the witches and was turned into an immortal black cat while saving his sister Emily. Before they die, Winifred (the oldest of the sisters) casts a spell stating they will return when a virgin lights a black candle in their house. In the present day, 1993, a newcomer from Los Angeles, California, Max, is bullied at school by two bullies, and has a crush on his schoolmate Allison. On Halloween night, his parents force him to go trick-or-treating with his sister Dani while they go to a party. Max and Dani stumbles upon the house of Allison and decide to go to the house of the Sanderson sisters. While at the house, Max lights a black candle and brings back Winifred, along with her sisters Sarah and Mary Sanderson. The sisters have but one night to suck the essence of the children of Salem and survive for more than one night before sunrise. But Max, Allison, and Dani want to avoid their wish to come true, so they team up with a 300-year-old cat and Winifred's lover, Billy Butcherson, to save the day.

=== Hocus Pocus 2 (2022) ===
In 1653, in Salem, the teenage Winifred Sanderson is banned from the village by the local Reverend Traske after refusing to marry John Pritchett. After causing havoc in the town, she runs with sisters Sarah and Mary to a forbidden forest. There, they meet the Mother Witch, who gives Winifred a magic spell book. In the present day, 29 years after the events of the first film, in 2022, an aspirant witch named Becca is celebrating her 16th birthday with her friend Izzy. When the owner of a magic store named Gilbert gives a magic black candle to Becca for her birthday, she goes to the forest with Izzy along with their other friend Cassie and they accidentally summon the Sanderson sisters. Winifred, Sarah, and Mary Sanderson return to seek children to eat and plan revenge against Reverend Traske's descendants. The trio must figure out how to stop the child-hungry witches from wreaking havoc on the world.

=== Hocus Pocus 3 (upcoming) ===
In October 2022, executive producer Adam Shankman stated that the storyline involving Becca in the second film allows for future projects, including potential spin-offs. By February 2023, Midler stated that while nothing was official she was open to returning in a third film. Kathy Najimy, Sarah Jessica Parker, Belissa Escobedo, and Lilia Buckingham as well as original film stars Omri Katz, Vinessa Shaw, and Jason Marsden each expressed interest in returning for a third installment. In June 2023, Sean Bailey, president of Walt Disney Studios Motion Picture Production, confirmed that a third film is in development, and planned for a release on Disney+. A few days later, Omri Katz expressed interest in reprising his role as Max Dennison for the third film only if asked by Disney. Later that month, it was announced that Anne Fletcher will once again serve as director, with a script written by Jen D'Angelo. In October 2023, D'Angelo confirmed that work on the script had already begun. In July 2024, Midler confirmed that the film was still in development. Later that month, during an appearance on QVC's Busy This Week, she confirmed that she still has not seen a script for the film yet, but has heard rumblings of one. The following year, in July 2025, Sarah Jessica Parker revealed on Watch What Happens Live with Andy Cohen that while the development progress on the movie was slow, conversations are currently ongoing to try to make it happen. In October 16, 2025, Tobias Jelinek, who played Jay Taylor in the original film, expressed his interest in reprising his role in the third film. Two days later, on October 18, during an appearance on Watch What Happens Live with Andy Cohen, Bette Midler confirmed that there was a script for the movie, citing discussions, budget and rewrites talks were ongoing. Later that same month, Thora Birch, who played Dani Dennison in the original film, stated that she was "super open" to returning to her role in the third film. In May 2026, a third film was officially announced, with Midler, Parker, and Najimy confirmed to reprise their roles.

== Television ==
=== Special ===
On October 20, 2018, a special entitled Hocus Pocus 25th Anniversary Halloween Bash aired on Freeform. The special featured interviews with members of the cast, including Bette Midler, Sarah Jessica Parker, and Kathy Najimy, as well as a costume contest hosted by Sharon and Kelly Osbourne. It was filmed at the Hollywood Forever Cemetery.

=== Potential series ===
In September 2022, franchise creator and executive producer for Hocus Pocus 2 David Kirschner, stated that he has ideas for a spin-off television series. Inspired by Buffy the Vampire Slayer, Kirschner stated that the concept revolves around Salem's supernatural history, including characters whose names appear on the tombstones during the first film.

== Short film ==
=== Hocus Pocus: As Told by Chibi (2022) ===
In 2022, Disney Channel ran a short titled Hocus Pocus: As Told by Chibi. This continues the trend started by Big Hero 6: The Series shorts spin-off Big Chibi 6 The Shorts and continued with several Disney franchises. The short was released on October 15, 2022, simplifies the plot of the first Hocus Pocus.

== Cast and characters ==
List indicators

This section includes characters who will appear or have appeared in more than two films in the series.

- An empty grey cell indicates the character was not in the film, or that the character's official presence has not yet been confirmed.
- ^{A} indicates an appearance through archival footage or audio.
- ^{V} indicates a voice-only role.
- ^{Y} indicates a younger version of the character.

Characters	Films		
Characters	Hocus Pocus	Hocus Pocus 2	Hocus Pocus 3
Characters	1993	2022	TBA
Winifred "Winnie" Sanderson	Bette Midler	Bette Midler Taylor Paige Henderson^{Y}	TBA
Sarah Sanderson	Sarah Jessica Parker	Sarah Jessica Parker Juju Brener^{Y}	TBA
Mary Sanderson	Kathy Najimy	Kathy Najimy Nina Kitchen^{Y}	TBA
William "Billy" Butcherson	Doug Jones	Doug Jones Austin J. Ryan^{Y}	TBA
Maximilian "Max" Dennison	Omri Katz	Uncredited Actors	TBA
Danielle "Dani" Dennison	Thora Birch	Uncredited Actors	TBA
Allison Watts	Vinessa Shaw	Uncredited Actors	TBA
David Dennison	Charles Rocket		
Jennifer Dennison	Stephanie Faracy		
Thackery Binx	Sean Murray Jason Marsden^{V}		
Miss Olin	Kathleen Marshall		
Emily Binx	Amanda Shepherd	Amanda Shepherd^{A}	
Master Devil	Garry Marshall	Garry Marshall^{A}	
Medusa Lady	Penny Marshall	Penny Marshall^{A}	
Ernie "Ice"	Larry Bagby		TBA
Jay	Tobias Jelinek		TBA
Elijah	Steve Voboril		
Mr. Binx	Norbert Weisser	Norbert Weisser^{A}	
Gilbert		Sam Richardson Jaylin Pryor^{Y}	TBA
Becca		Whitney Peak	TBA
Izzy		Belissa Escobedo	TBA
Jefry Traske		Tony Hale	TBA
Reverend Traske		Tony Hale	
Mother Witch		Hannah Waddingham	TBA
Cassie Traske		Lilia Buckingham	TBA
Mike		Froy Gutierrez	TBA

== Additional crew and production details ==
Film	Crew/Detail					
Film	Composer	Cinematographer	Editor	Production companies	Distributing company	Running time
Hocus Pocus	John Debney	Hiro Narita	Peter E. Berger	Walt Disney Pictures, Touchwood Pacific Partners 1	Buena Vista Pictures Distribution	1 hr 36 mins
Hocus Pocus 2	John Debney	Elliot Davis	Julia Wong	Walt Disney Pictures, David Kirschner Productions, Weimaraner Republic Pictures, Disney+ Original Films	Disney+	1 hr 43 mins

== Reception ==
=== Viewership ratings ===
In 2009, during ABC Family's (now Freeform) 13 Nights of Halloween lineup, a broadcast of the first film garnered 2.5 million viewers. In 2011, an October 29 airing became the lineup's most watched program, garnering 2.8 million viewers. In 2018, the lineup, now known as 31 Nights of Halloween during its 25th anniversary year, the first week of Hocus Pocus viewings garnered 8.2 million viewers.

==== SVOD viewership ====
According to Whip Media, Hocus Pocus was the most watched movie across all platforms in the United States during the week of October 31, 2021. According to Whip Media, Hocus Pocus was the 2nd most watched movie across all platforms in the United States during the week of September 30, 2022 to October 2, 2022, the 7th during the week of October 9, 2022, and the 9th during the week of October 23, 2022.

In October 2022, Disney+ reported Hocus Pocus 2 was the service's most-viewed-film premiere in the United States, based on the number of hours streamed in the first three days of its release. Disney later reported that Hocus Pocus 2 was the service's most-viewed film.

According to Whip Media, Hocus Pocus 2 was the 2nd most anticipated film of September 2022, the most watched straight-to-streaming title of 2022 in its first three days, as of October 2022, the most watched film across all platforms in the United States during the week of September 30, 2022, to October 2, 2022, the 2nd during the week of October 9, 2022, the 4th during the week of October 23, 2022, as well as the 4th during the week of October 30, 2022, and the 9th during the week of November 4, 2022 to November 6, 2022. According to the streaming aggregator Reelgood, Hocus Pocus 2 was the most watched program across all platforms during the weeks of October 5, 2022, and October 14, 2022.

=== Box office performance ===
Film	Release date	Box office gross				Box office ranking		Budget	Ref(s)
Film	Release date	United States opening weekend	North America	Other territories	Worldwide	All time North America	All time worldwide	Budget	Ref(s)
Hocus Pocus	July 16, 1993	$8,125,471	$44,101,060	$1,046,929	$45,147,989	#2,056	—N/a	$28 million	
Hocus Pocus 2	September 30, 2022	—N/a	—N/a	—N/a	—N/a	—N/a	—N/a	$40 million	
Totals			44,101,060	1,046,929	45,147,989			$68 million	—N/a

=== Critical and public response ===
Film	Critical		Public
Film	Rotten Tomatoes	Metacritic	CinemaScore
Hocus Pocus	40% (63 reviews)	43 (27 reviews)	B+
Hocus Pocus 2	65% (157 reviews)	56 (32 reviews)	—N/a

== In other media ==
=== Events ===
- In October 2011, the Houston Symphony celebrated various horror and Halloween classics, including Hocus Pocus, with "The Hocus Pocus Pops".
- In October 2013, D23 held a special screening of Hocus Pocus at the Walt Disney Studios in Burbank, California, to honor the 20th anniversary of the film. Nine of the cast and crew gathered for the screening, and hundreds of D23 members attended. Returning members included Kathy Najimy, David Kirschner, Thora Birch, Doug Jones, Vinessa Shaw, and Omri Katz.
- During her Divine Intervention Tour in 2015, Bette Midler appeared on stage dressed as Winifred Sanderson. Her Harlettes appeared with her dressed as Mary and Sarah, and the three of them performed the film's version of "I Put a Spell on You".
- In October 2020, the cast reunited for "In Search of the Sanderson Sisters: A Hocus Pocus Hulaween Takeover". The one-hour broadcast was virtual due to the COVID-19 pandemic, and the proceeds went to the New York Restoration Project. Members of the cast who participated were Bette Midler, Sarah Jessica Parker, Kathy Najimy, Thora Birch, Omri Katz, Vinessa Shaw, and Doug Jones. Other notable participants of the benefit included Meryl Streep, Mariah Carey, Cassandra Peterson, Glenn Close, Billy Crystal, Jamie Lee Curtis, Todrick Hall, Jennifer Hudson, Anjelah Johnson-Reyes, Michael Kors, Adam Lambert, George Lopez, Alex Moffat, Martin Short, Sarah Silverman, John Stamos, Kenan Thompson, Sophie von Haselberg, and Bella Hadid.
- The City of Salem has celebrated its connection to Hocus Pocus, while local filming sites have become an attraction for fans as the film's legacy has grown over the years. In 2018, the Haunted Happenings Grand Parade, an annual Salem festival held every October, was Hocus Pocus-themed in honor of the film's 25th anniversary. A representative for Destination Salem also reported a huge uptick in tourism for the 25th anniversary year, stating: "There's always been a 'Hocus Pocus' component to the visitors to Salem, especially in October. But it's like the film's following grows every year."

=== Literary ===
Novelization

In July 2018, a book entitled Hocus Pocus and the All-New Sequel was released, containing a novelization of film and a sequel story. The sequel focuses of Max and Allison's daughter, Poppy, who grew up hearing the family story of the original film and parents who avoid Halloween as much as possible. Poppy is skeptical of the tale and ends up in the Sanderson house on Halloween, 25 years to the day the original film takes place, in an attempt to prove there is nothing to the story.

Behind the Scenes

In September 2016, entertainment critic Aaron Wallace published Hocus Pocus in Focus: The Thinking Fan's Guide to Disney's Halloween Classic, the first full-length book written about the film. The book includes a foreword by Thora Birch and afterword by Mick Garris. Billed as a "lighthearted but scholarly look at the film", the book analyzes the film's major themes, which it identifies as festivity, nostalgia, home, horror, virginity, feminism, Broadway-style musical moments, sibling rivalry, "Spielbergian" filmmaking style, Disney villain traditions, and more. Wallace also analyzes Walt Disney World's Hocus Pocus Villain Spelltacular as part of the film's legacy and includes "the largest collection of Hocus Pocus fun facts and trivia ever assembled", complete with extensive endnote citations.

=== Video games ===
The Sanderson sisters appear as playable characters in Disney video games such as Disney Magic Kingdoms (2016) and Disney Heroes: Battle Mode (2018).

=== Stage adaptation ===
During an interview on The Big Seance Podcast in September 2021, creator David Kirschner revealed that a Broadway adaptation of the original film is in development." During an interview leading up to the release of Hocus Pocus 2 in September 2022, he stated that "I just want to pinch myself, and I'm just afraid that I'm going to be 9 years old and on a Little League field again. But it's just so wonderful just to stand back and watch all of this ... I think you're going to be very pleased." Kenny Ortega, the director of the original film, previously revealed to Forbes in September 2020 of his interest to direct the production, stating "I think a Hocus Pocus musical would be great fun, really great fun."

=== Attractions ===
Hocus Pocus Villain Spelltacular

In September 2015, the Hocus Pocus Villain Spelltacular was introduced at the Magic Kingdom as part of Mickey's Not-So-Scary Halloween Party at Walt Disney World. The show features the Sanderson sisters who try to make a villain party and summon or attract various Disney villains in the process.

Halloween Screams

Since 2009, "I Put a Spell on You" which features prominently in the first movie, plays during the audience exit for the fireworks show Halloween Screams for Mickey's Halloween Party at Disneyland.

=== Lego set ===
On July 4, 2023, Hocus Pocus: The Sanderson Sisters’ Cottage (set number: 21341) was released and is based on a scene from the first Hocus Pocus. The winning project's announcement came over two months before the release of the sequel Hocus Pocus 2. The set consists of 2316 pieces with 6 minifigures. The set included Lego minifigures of the three Sanderson Sisters (Winifred, Sarah and Mary), Max, Danni, Allison and Thackery Binx as a black cat.

== See also ==
- Halloweentown (film series)
- List of films about witchcraft
- List of films set around Halloween
