= 31 Nights of Halloween =

Seasonal programming block on Freeform

- Network: Fox Family (1998–2001); ABC Family (2002–2015); Freeform (2016–present)
- Launched: October 19, 1998; 28 years ago
- Country of origin: United States
- Formerly known as: 13 Days of Halloween (1998–2001); 13 Nights of Halloween (2002–2017)
- Format: Horror films and Halloween-based programming
- Running time: Nightly, annually from October 19 to 31 (until 2017); Nightly, annually from October 1 to 31 (2018–present)
- Original language: English

31 Nights of Halloween (formerly 13 Days of Halloween and 13 Nights of Halloween) is an American seasonal programming block on Freeform. It originally began airing in 1998, after the Family Channel became Fox Family, and was continued through the channel's change into ABC Family, and later, Freeform. The 13 Days of Halloween block was created mainly due to the success of the channel's 25 Days of Christmas, which had started two years earlier; the two blocks remain as the network's tentpoles. The special block lasted from October 19 until Halloween night, covering the thirteen days before the holiday. Starting in 2018, the program aired throughout the whole month of October.

== History ==
From 1998 to 2004, the block consisted mainly of made-for-TV movies aimed at an older audience, such as Casper: A Spirited Beginning, The Haunting of Seacliff Inn, Lost Souls, The Spiral Staircase, When Good Ghouls Go Bad, Deadly Invasion: The Killer Bee Nightmare, Tower of Terror, The Hollow, and Grave Secrets: The Legacy of Hilltop Drive, and Halloween themed specials such as Scariest Places on Earth and Ghost Stories.

Then starting in 2006, the lineup shifted more towards feature films aimed at a younger audience such as Hocus Pocus, The Haunted Mansion, The Addams Family and its sequel, Monsters, Inc., and the Harry Potter film series. Hocus Pocus emerged as the block's sleeper hit, and by the end of the 2010s it had become the most prominently featured film in the block, earning an all-day marathon on Halloween itself.

The programming block was not aired in 2003 as ABC Family's new executives decided not to air the block for reasons that remain unclear, but it returned in 2004. Over the following years, the block focused more on family-oriented feature films and away from specific Halloween-based programs.

In 2011, ABC Family switched the focus of the programming block to its original purpose (primarily Halloween/Horror related films), while still remaining appropriate for children and families. Films that air during the lineup are usually edited for time constraints and for profane content, such as language or sexuality, to appeal towards all audiences.

With the launch of Freeform in 2016, the block remained largely the same, continuing to show Halloween-based family films.

On May 15, 2018, Freeform announced that the block will be renamed to 31 Nights of Halloween, meaning the lineup will start on the very first day of October rather than October 19.

In 2023, Freeform was permanently removed from Spectrum cable systems as part of the resolution of a carriage dispute between Spectrum and parent company The Walt Disney Company. As part of an initiative to keep Freeform's content available through Disney's streaming platforms, Disney made most of the 31 Nights of Halloween library available through Disney+ under the "Hallowstream" banner.

For 2026, most of the block's acquired series and non-Halloween films were dropped; added in 2026 was a new original limited-run series, the ten-episode Coven Academy, created specifically for the block.

== Programming ==
=== Current Halloween specials ===
- Toy Story of Terror!

=== Current series ===
- Coven Academy

=== Current films ===
- The Addams Family
  - The Addams Family
  - Addams Family Values
- The Adventures of Ichabod and Mr. Toad
- Arachnophobia
- Beetlejuice
- Casper
- Cruella
- Dark Shadows
- Edward Scissorhands
- Frankenweenie
- Ghostbusters series
  - Ghostbusters (1984)
  - Ghostbusters II
  - Ghostbusters (2016)
  - Ghostbusters: Afterlife
  - Ghostbusters: Frozen Empire
- The Haunted Mansion series
  - The Haunted Mansion (2003)
  - Haunted Mansion (2023)
- Hocus Pocus series
  - Hocus Pocus
  - Hocus Pocus 2
- Little Shop of Horrors
- Maleficent franchise
  - Maleficent
  - Maleficent: Mistress of Evil
- Monsters, Inc. franchise
  - Monsters, Inc.
  - Monsters University
- The Nightmare Before Christmas
- Scooby-Doo series
  - Scooby-Doo
  - Scooby-Doo 2: Monsters Unleashed
- Sleepy Hollow
- Sony's Spider-Man (Sam Raimi/Tobey Maguire universe)
  - Spider-Man (2002)
  - Spider-Man 2
- Something Wicked This Way Comes
- Spooky Buddies (Air Bud(dies) franchise)
- Sweeney Todd: The Demon Barber of Fleet Street

== Ratings ==
In 2008, viewers averaged 1.2 million. For 2009, the lineup averaged 1.4 million viewers, up from the previous year. Hocus Pocus drew record numbers of near 2.5 million, while Edward Scissorhands drew over 1 million viewers. Total viewers dropped in 2010, averaging just 1.2 million viewers. In 2011, Pretty Little Liars Halloween themed episode, "The First Secret", at the time, the lineup's most watched program. The special episode aired with more than 2.5 million viewers. Viewers for the entire lineup broke record, averaging 1.6 million viewers in 2011, thanks to debuts such as Coraline. The October 29 airing of Hocus Pocus drew the 13 Nights of Halloween's highest viewers ever, with 2.8 million.

=== 2010s ===
==== 2012 ====
In 2012, the second Halloween-themed episode of Pretty Little Liars, "This is A Dark Ride" guest-starring former American Idol contestant Adam Lambert drew 2.8 million viewers. ABC Family announced that the episode had become the lineup's most watched programming in their key demographics in the block's fourteen-year history. Due to the success of previous years airings of Hocus Pocus, multiple airings were scheduled throughout the 2012 lineup. The first initial broadcast of the film on October 23 was watched by 1.6 million viewers. Broadcasts of the film on the nights of October 28 and 31 were watched by 1.9 million and 1.3 million viewers respectively. The network premiere of the film The Sorcerer's Apprentice on October 28 was watched by 2.1 million viewers. Overall viewers for the 2012 season were down from the previous year, with an average of 1.5 million viewers.

==== 2014 ====
ABC Family released the 2014 schedule on September 10, 2014.

The popular programming event, now in its 16th year, started October 19 and concluded on October 31. The schedule features brand-new Halloween-themed episodes of Melissa & Joey and Baby Daddy, an all-new Pretty Little Liars fan appreciation special, plus the scary prank specials Freak Out. The stunt will also include the network television premieres of Dark Shadows and ParaNorman, and prime time airings of Hocus Pocus, Beetlejuice, and Monsters Inc.

Ratings for the 2014 event were generally even across the board with prior years. October 19, the first day of the event, held ratings of Harry Potter, 1.5 million viewers, Toy Story of Terror, 1.7 million, and a prime time airing of Monsters Inc. gaining 1.7 million viewers. The Pretty Little Liars special airing October 21 had 1.3 million viewers while Melissa and Joey registered 1.1 million. The network airing of Dark Shadows on October 24 registered a mediocre 1 million viewers. An airing of The Adams Family had a decent 1.21 million viewers while a Halloween airing of Casper had 1.4 million viewers. The highest rated programs of the event were Monsters Inc at, 1.7 million on October 19, and Hocus Pocus on October 26, also at 1.7 million.

==== 2015 ====
The 2015 line up was released on September 2.

The highest rated event for 2015's 13 Nights of Halloween was the premiere of Monsters University at 2.081m viewers, up from 2012's high of 1.7m. Hocus Pocus, which aired a staggering ten times during the event saw its highest rated showing at 1.7m viewers, even with previous years. The Adams Family highest rated showing peaked at 1.6m viewers. Overall the rest of the event peaked around 1 million viewers. The 2015 lineup averaged 1.1905m viewers, down dramatically from previous years.

==== 2016 ====
ABC Family rebranded itself as Freeform in 2016, but continued airing 13 Nights of Halloween.

13 Nights of Halloween lineup was released on September 14, 2016. The 2016 line up features films such as Hocus Pocus, Corpse Bride, Scooby-Doo, Scooby-Doo 2: Monsters Unleashed, Monsters University, Practical Magic, and Death Becomes Her. The line up for Halloween day includes Steven Spielberg's classic The Goonies, The Addams Family, Addams Family Values, and two back to back airings of Disney's cult classic Hocus Pocus.

Ratings for 2016's 13 Nights were overall down. Hocus Pocus was the highest rated film, with its highest viewing at 1.308M on October 23. The rest of the Hocus Pocus airings stayed around 1.000M consistently. Monsters University gained 1.234M on that same date. The highest rated showing of The Addams Family was 1.116M on October 20.

==== 2017 ====
13 Nights of Halloween lineup was released on September 12, 2017. The schedule includes films such as the 2003 incarnation of The Haunted Mansion, The Addams Family, The Sorcerer's Apprentice, Sleepy Hollow, Edward Scissorhands, Charlie and the Chocolate Factory, and Bewitched. A Tim Burton film marathon and a Hocus Pocus marathon on Halloween were also included in the schedule.

==== 2018 ====
Starting in 2018, the special airs throughout the whole month of October. The full lineup included classics like Edward Scissorhands, Toy Story of Terror!, ParaNorman, The Witches of Eastwick, Monster House, Hotel Transylvania, Monsters, Inc., Monsters University, The Haunted Mansion, The Nightmare Before Christmas, Clue, and The Addams Family. The entire marathon then concluded with six back-to-back screenings of Hocus Pocus on October 31. There were also several nostalgic flicks with no Halloween tie-in featuring Mulan, Bolt, The Goonies, Charlie and the Chocolate Factory, The Hunchback of Notre Dame, Frozen, The Breakfast Club, Jurassic Park, Big Hero 6, Willy Wonka and the Chocolate Factory, The Parent Trap and Mrs. Doubtfire. Multiple Halloween-themed episodes of The Middle were also aired.

On October 6, 942,000 viewers tuned in to watch the network premiere of Maleficent, followed by the premiere of Warm Bodies, which was followed by 376,000 people. On October 7, the network premiere of Sweeney Todd: The Demon Barber of Fleet Street was watched by 395,000 viewers. The Freeform premiere of The Witches of Eastwick on October 22 was followed by 584,000 people.

On October 14, the Decorating Disney: Halloween Magic special premiered with 932,000 total viewers tuning in to the show, hosted by Cierra Ramirez from Freeform's The Fosters and Good Trouble, that gave viewers a look on how Disney parks and ships are decorated for Halloween overnight. The special was followed up by the Freeform premiere of Hotel Transylvania, which was watched by 683,000 total viewers.

A Hocus Pocus 25th Anniversary Halloween Bash special premiered on the network on October 20, as part of the 31 Nights of Halloween lineup. Original stars from the movie, Bette Midler, Sarah Jessica Parker, Kathy Najimy and more joined the special. Vanessa Hudgens and Jordan Fisher hosted and had special performances by Dove Cameron, Jordin Sparks and more. The special was the most-watched show of the 2018 edition of 31 Nights of Halloween, with over 1,397,000 people tuning in.

==== 2019 ====
The programming focus again spanned the entire "31 Nights" of October, with a lineup including The Nightmare Before Christmas, Hocus Pocus, Scooby-Doo and Scooby-Doo 2: Monsters Unleashed, Monsters, Inc., Edward Scissorhands, The Addams Family and Addams Family Values, Hotel Transylvania, ParaNorman, Monster House, Corpse Bride, and the first two Ghostbusters films. It also features the network premieres of Goosebumps, Mostly Ghostly: One Night in Doom House, the first three Scream films, and the specials Monsters vs. Aliens: Mutant Pumpkins from Outer Space and Scared Shrekless. This was also the first year to feature short marathons of Treehouse of Horror episodes of The Simpsons. It featured non-Halloween family films such as Willy Wonka & the Chocolate Factory, Hook, Matilda, Finding Nemo, Finding Dory, National Treasure, 101 Dalmatians, Iron Man, Charlie and the Chocolate Factory, Moana, Mrs. Doubtfire, Zootopia and The Incredibles.

=== 2020s ===
==== 2020 ====
This seasonal lineup features frequent airings of Gremlins, Beetlejuice, Casper, The Craft, The Mummy and The Mummy Returns. It also features the network premieres of The Scorpion King, The Mummy: Tomb of the Dragon Emperor, Hotel Transylvania 2, Hotel Transylvania 3: Summer Vacation, and the 2016 Ghostbusters film. In addition, this holiday block includes Halloweentown, Halloweentown II: Kalabar's Revenge, Twitches and Twitches Too. The only non-Halloween films in this seasonal television schedule are Willy Wonka and the Chocolate Factory, The Goonies, Jumanji, Matilda and Shrek.

==== 2021 ====
This year's seasonal lineup includes the network premieres of Maleficent: Mistress of Evil, Men in Black II, The House with a Clock in Its Walls, Miss Peregrine's Home for Peculiar Children, Fright Night, Goosebumps 2: Haunted Halloween, Cowboys & Aliens, The Huntsman: Winter's War, and the first three Jaws films. This is also the first year to feature short marathons of Family Guy Halloween episodes. It features a few non-Halloween film classics including Mrs. Doubtfire, Hook, Willy Wonka and the Chocolate Factory, Charlie and the Chocolate Factory, The Goonies, and Men in Black.

==== 2022 ====
This year's seasonal lineup includes frequent airings of the 1990 The Witches film, the 2016 Ghostbusters film, Goosebumps 2: Haunted Halloween, the Hotel Transylvania trilogy, The House with a Clock in Its Walls, and Miss Peregrine's Home for Peculiar Children. It also features the network premieres of Buffy the Vampire Slayer, Get Out, Happy Death Day, Happy Death Day 2U, A Quiet Place, and the 2018 Halloween film.

==== 2023 ====
This year's lineup includes several airings of the Twilight film series, the 1986 horror comedy musical Little Shop of Horrors, and regular staples of the block such as Hocus Pocus, The Addams Family, Halloweentown, Goosebumps, and The Nightmare Before Christmas. It also features the network premieres of Encanto, Zombies, and Zombies 2. Non-Halloween films featured during the block include Sam Raimi's Spider-Man trilogy and Marc Webb's Amazing Spider-Man duology. To promote the release of the recent Goosebumps series, the series' first two episodes were aired during the block.

==== 2024 ====
This year's lineup includes several airings of Hocus Pocus, Beetlejuice, Casper, the 2003 Haunted Mansion film, Goosebumps 2: Haunted Halloween, Ghostbusters: Afterlife, Halloweentown, and The Nightmare Before Christmas. It also features the network premieres of Hocus Pocus 2, the 2023 Haunted Mansion film, Arachnophobia, Something Wicked This Way Comes, Muppets from Space, and The Adventures of Ichabod and Mr. Toad. Non-Halloween films featured in the block include Mrs. Doubtfire, both The Incredibles films, the first three Despicable Me films, and the first four Pirates of the Caribbean films. To promote the release of the Goosebumps series' second season, a marathon consisting of the series' first season was aired during the block.

==== 2025 ====
This year's lineup includes regular staples of the block, including Hocus Pocus, Casper, The Addams Family, Addams Family Values, Beetlejuice and The Haunted Mansion. Several films were aired together in double features, such as Hotel Transylvania and Hotel Transylvania 2, Halloweentown and Halloweentown II: Kalabar's Revenge, and Hocus Pocus and Hocus Pocus 2. October 13 is dedicated to the films of Tim Burton, with airings of Sweeney Todd: The Demon Barber of Fleet Street, Sleepy Hollow, Edward Scissorhands and The Nightmare Before Christmas. Other films which also aired during the block include The Witches, Beastly, Goosebumps 2: Haunted Halloween, and Maleficent and its sequel, Maleficent: Mistress of Evil. Several non-Halloween films also aired throughout the block, including Matilda, Mrs Doubtfire, Encanto, Aladdin, 101 Dalmatians, Alice in Wonderland and its sequel, Alice Through the Looking Glass, and films from the Pirates of the Caribbean franchise.

==== 2026 ====
This year's block features airings of Hocus Pocus, Hocus Pocus 2, The Addams Family, Addams Family Values, The Haunted Mansion, Casper, Scooby Doo, Scooby Doo 2: Monsters Unleashed, Beetlejuice, Monsters Inc, and Monsters University. The Ghostbusters franchise is also heavily featured, with frequent airings of Ghostbusters, Ghostbusters 2, Ghostbusters, Ghostbusters: Afterlife and the network premiere of Ghostbusters: Frozen Empire. October 16th is dedicated to the films of Tim Burton, with airings of Sweeney Todd: The Demon Barber of Fleet Street, Edward Scissorhands, Dark Shadows, The Nightmare Before Christmas and Sleepy Hollow. The only non-Halloween themed films aired in this year's block are Sam Raimi's Spider-Man trilogy, and an airing of Spider Man: Homecoming. The block also featured the premiere of a new original teen drama series, Coven Academy.
