= Hoku (disambiguation) =

Hoku (Hoku Ho Clements, born 1981) is an American singer.

Hoku may also refer to:

- Hoku (album), a 2000 album by Hoku
- Hoku Awards, or Na Hoku Hanohano Awards, a music award in Hawaii
- Hoku Garza, Hawaiian reggae musician

== See also ==
- Hocus Pocus (disambiguation)
- Griever de Hocus, a character from Griever: An American Monkey King in China
- Sir Hokus of Pokes, a character from Oz
