= Hocus Pocus (soundtrack) =

Hocus Pocus: Original Motion Picture Soundtrack

Soundtrack album by John Debney
- Released: October 1, 2013
- Recorded: June 1993
- Studio: Todd-AO
- Genre: Film score
- Length: 74:25
- Label: Intrada
- Producer: Douglass Fake

Hocus Pocus chronology
Hocus Pocus: Original Motion Picture Soundtrack (2013)	Hocus Pocus 2 (2022)

Hocus Pocus: Original Motion Picture Soundtrack is the score for the 1993 Walt Disney Pictures Halloween comedy film of the same name. It was composed and conducted by John Debney and performed by the Hollywood Studio Symphony.

The soundtrack was first officially released on October 1, 2013, over twenty years after the film's release, by Intrada Records. The album included the complete film score along with bonus material.

== Background ==
In 1993, Debney's agency released a promotional CD containing 19 tracks from the film, in hopes of a future commercial release. However, it did not come to fruition, and the promo has since become a rare collector's item. The film did not have a soundtrack album available to the public until Intrada Records released their special complete edition in late 2013.

As a result of the score being cut from its original running time of over 60 minutes down to 43 minutes in Debney's promo, as well as all the music from the prologue sequence being removed, many bootleg recordings of the score were leaked online, most containing all the music from the film in addition to never-before-heard alternates, some of which did not appear on the official release.

The music was conducted by Debney and orchestrated by Brad Detcher and Don Davis. James Horner was originally slated to score the film, but became unavailable at the last minute, so Debney had only two weeks to score the 96-minute film. Prior to the production of the film, Horner wrote a two-minute theme for Sarah (commonly known as "Come Little Children"), which ended up being used in the film, and featured in Intrada's edition of the score (officially titled "Sarah's Theme").

The song "Almost Unreal" by Roxette was written for the film, hence the lyric "I love when you do that hocus pocus to me". At the last minute the producers replaced them with En Vogue, though they too were ultimately dropped. "Almost Unreal" ended up being used for the film adaptation of the Nintendo game series Super Mario Bros., which was released two months prior.

== Track listing ==
All tracks are written by John Debney, except track 10 by Wolfgang Amadeus Mozart and track 21 with music by James Horner and lyrics by Brock Walsh. Track 21 is performed by Sarah Jessica Parker.

Intrada Special Edition
No.	Title	Length
1.	"Main Title"	1:31
2.	"Garden of Magic/Thackery Follows Emily"	2:27
3.	"Witches' Lair"	5:43
4.	"To the Stake"	0:27
5.	"Death to the Witches"	1:11
6.	"Meeting Allison"	2:05
7.	"Max Loses Shoes"	0:38
8.	"Hallowe'en"	1:12
9.	"Max and Dani"	1:22
10.	"Divertimento #17 in D, K. 334"	3:46
11.	"To the Witches' House We Go"	2:25
12.	"The Black Candle"	2:24
13.	"Witches on a Rampage"	4:26
14.	"Graveyard Attack"	3:56
15.	"The Calming Circle"	3:02
16.	"The Master"	0:18
17.	"Fingers"	1:09
18.	"Springing the Trap"	4:39
19.	"Winnie's Lament"	3:06
20.	"Witches Flight"	3:17
21.	"Sarah's Theme"	2:11
22.	"Max Fools the Witches"	2:54
23.	"Winnie Catches Up"	0:49
24.	"Billy Speaks"	1:31
25.	"Witches Capture Dani"	4:52
26.	"Witches Demise/Resurrection"	4:51
27.	"End Credits"	3:19
28.	"Witches' Lair Pt. 3" (original version)	0:31
29.	"Witches Take Dani" (alternate)	1:26
30.	"Winnie Catches Up" (alternate)	0:40
31.	"String Tremolo"	0:24
32.	"End Credits" (alternate)	1:53
Total length:		74:25

Original promo
No.	Title	Length
1.	"Main Titles"	1:17
2.	"Max Meets Allison"	2:03
3.	"Halloween"	0:40
4.	"To the Witches' House We Go"	1:41
5.	"Max Lights the Enchanted Candle"	1:45
6.	"Escape from Witches' Lair"	2:06
7.	"Brother/Sister Theme"	1:53
8.	"Witches on a Rampage"	1:23
9.	"Graveyard Attack"	3:03
10.	"Witches on Holiday"	1:47
11.	"Who Stole the Brooms?"	1:03
12.	"Witches Tricked/Safe Again?"	2:46
13.	"Winnie's Lament/The Capture"	3:57
14.	"Setting the Trap/Scherzo"	2:53
15.	"Brother/Sister Talk"	1:22
16.	"Winnie Flies/Zombie Speaks"	2:14
17.	"Witch Attack"	4:47
18.	"Conflagration/Resurrection"	4:51
19.	"End Titles"	1:34
Total length:		43:05

=== Unassembled cue list ===
1. "Main Title"
2. "Main Title Pt. 2"
3. "Garden of Magic No. 1"
4. "Thackery Follows Emily"
5. "Witches' Lair Pt. 1"
6. "Witches' Lair Pt. 2"
7. "Witches' Lair Pt. 3"
8. "To the Stake"
9. "Death to the Witches"
10. "Meeting Allison"
11. "Max Loses Shoes"
12. "The Closet"
13. "Hallowe'en"
14. "Max and Dani"
15. "Divertimento #17 in D, K. 334"
16. "To the Witches' House We Go"
17. "What's That?"
18. "The Black Candle"
19. "The Girls Come Home"
20. "Escape from the Witches' Lair"
21. "Witches on a Rampage"
22. "Get the Book!"
23. "Binx's Story"
24. "Graveyard Attack"
25. "Evil Intent"
26. "The Calming Circle"
27. "Winnie Wants Children"
28. "The Master"
29. "Fingers"
30. "Hallowe'en Holiday"
31. "Springing the Trap - Part 1"
32. "Springing the Trap - Part 2"
33. "Up in Smoke Aftermath"
34. "Is It Safe?"
35. "Ernie Goes Too Far"
36. "Winnie's Lament"
37. "Witches Flight"
38. "Witches Take Dani"
39. "Sarah's Theme (Garden of Magic No. 2)"
40. "Max Fools the Witches"
41. "Winnie Catches Up"
42. "Billy Speaks"
43. "Witches Capture Dani Pt. 1"
44. "Witches Capture Dani Pt. 2"
45. "Witches Demise/Resurrection"
46. "String Tremolo (Bridge to End Song)"
47. "End Credits Pt. 1"
48. "End Credits Pt. 2"
