= Luck (soundtrack) =

Luck (Soundtrack from the Apple Original Film)

Film score by John Debney
- Released: August 5, 2022
- Recorded: 2021–2022
- Studios: Air Lyndhurst Studios, London
- Genre: Film score
- Length: 67:18
- Label: Milan
- Producer: John Debney

John Debney chronology
Marry Me (2022)	Luck (2022)	Hocus Pocus 2 (2022)

Luck (Soundtrack from the Apple Original Film) is the score album to the 2022 film of the same name, released by Milan Records on August 5, 2022, the same day as its Apple TV+ release. The album featured 30 tracks from the original score composed and conducted by John Debney and a cover of the 1983 song "Lucky Star" performed by Eva Noblezada (who stars as the protagonist) and additional vocals by Alana Da Fonseca, also included in the album.

== Development ==
Tanya Donelly and Mt. Joy were initially intended to score for the film, before they were replaced by John Debney in November 2021. Debney called it as a "dream come true" moment on writing music for the film, and said that he "fell in love with the idea of a Land Of Luck which mirrors and influences our own world". He dedicated the main theme to his own granddaughter.

Re-recording mixer Gary A. Rizzo, who worked on the film had praised Debney's score at the Mix magazine's annual Sound for Film & TV conference, saying "He's very good with Sam's theme and [the cat] Bob's theme. It's wonderful music. In my job, I'm constantly evaluating to see what works and what doesn't — and, emotionally, what we need out of the scene. It could be a sound effect or it could be music. It's one of the billions of decisions we have to make every day."

== Reception ==
Filmtracks.com wrote "Luck enjoys near-perfect execution of the genre by Debney. While music like this typically earns a four-star rating, this score achieves a fifth star because of its vibrant and engaging mix. Each solo element is masterfully placed for the best emphasis, and the brass in particular truly shines when present. Listeners allergic to wholesome major-key goodness may find little of value, but Debney's handling of the concept is more than lucky from start to finish." Soundtrack World wrote "What I love about the music for Luck is its delightfulness. There are some darker moments in the movie, but they are never genuinely harmful in a musical way; it is a children's movie, after all. The music for Luck is an excellent score from start to finish and should lift your spirits when you are listening to it."

Some critics had given praise for John Debney's score, despite giving mixed critical response. Deadline Hollywood critic Pete Hammond, called the score as "atmospheric", and Lovia Gyarkye of The Hollywood Reporter called it as "upbeat". Alex Maidy of JoBlo.com wrote "The soundtrack is also very nice with a solid score composed by John Debney." Amy Amatangelo of Paste Magazine "The soaring, uplifting score by composer John Debney is one of the movie's biggest assets."

== Accolades ==
It is intended to be the possible contender for "Best Original Score" category at the 95th Academy Awards and 80th Golden Globe Awards, respectively, according to Variety.

Award	Date of ceremony	Category	Recipient(s)	Result	Ref.
Hollywood Music in Media Awards	November 16, 2022	Best Original Score in an Animated Film	John Debney	Nominated	

== Track listing ==
No.	Title	Length
1.	"Samantha's Theme"	2:08
2.	"Sam and Hazel"	0:51
3.	"Good Luck All Day Long"	3:22
4.	"Unlucky Day"	2:13
5.	"Bob the Cat"	1:44
6.	"A Great Job"	0:27
7.	"A Penny Lost"	1:13
8.	"Chasing a Cat"	2:51
9.	"Sam Meets Bob"	1:54
10.	"Land of Luck"	2:47
11.	"Hazmat Bunnies"	2:16
12.	"Making Good Luck"	2:05
13.	"Good Morning"	1:56
14.	"Randomizer"	2:24
15.	"I Got This"	0:47
16.	"Bunny Drone Activation"	1:17
17.	"Lucky Star" (Eva Noblezada)	1:16
18.	"A Lift in Between"	4:35
19.	"Anything Is Possible"	2:19
20.	"Bad Luck in Between"	2:20
21.	"Bad Luck, Bad Cat"	2:45
22.	"She Has You"	2:47
23.	"Meet Rootie"	2:03
24.	"With These Two Stones"	2:51
25.	"Bad Luck is Good / Fixing the Randomizer"	5:04
26.	"A Forever Family"	3:28
27.	"One Year Later"	2:44
28.	"Luck Theme"	1:54
29.	"Luck Teaser"	1:15
30.	"The Penny Depot"	1:42
Total length:		67:18
