= Belissa Escobedo =

American actress

- Occupation: Actress
- Years active: 2014–present

Belissa Escobedo is an American actress. She made her debut starring in the ABC romantic comedy-drama series The Baker and the Beauty (2020). She later appeared in films Hocus Pocus 2 (2022) and Blue Beetle (2023).

== Career ==
In 2014, Escobedo, Rhiannon McGavin, and Zariya Allen performed their poem "Somewhere in America" on The Queen Latifah Show. Escobedo's breakthrough role was in ABC's 2020 series The Baker and the Beauty. In 2021, she appeared in two episodes of American Horror Stories. She played Bianca in the 2022 comedy film, Sex Appeal. Later that year, Escobedo co-starred in the fantasy comedy film Hocus Pocus 2. In 2023 she appeared in the comedy-drama Sid Is Dead, and the superhero film Blue Beetle.

In 2024, Escobedo was cast opposite Reba McEntire in her NBC comedy series, Happy's Place playing her 20-something sister. The show was renewed for a third season.

== Filmography ==
=== Film ===
Year	Title	Role	Notes
2021	Helping Amy	Amy	Short film
2022	Sex Appeal	Bianca	
2022	Hocus Pocus 2	Izzy	
2023	Sid Is Dead	Luna Peralta	
2023	Blue Beetle	Milagro Reyes	

=== Television ===
Year	Title	Role	Notes
2020	The Baker and the Beauty	Natalie Garcia	Series regular, 9 episodes
2020	Don't Look Deeper	Cari	Series regular, 7 episodes
2021	American Horror Stories	Shanti	2 episodes
2024–present	Happy's Place	Isabella	Main cast
