= Mickey's Not-So-Scary Halloween Party =

Annual Halloween-themed event

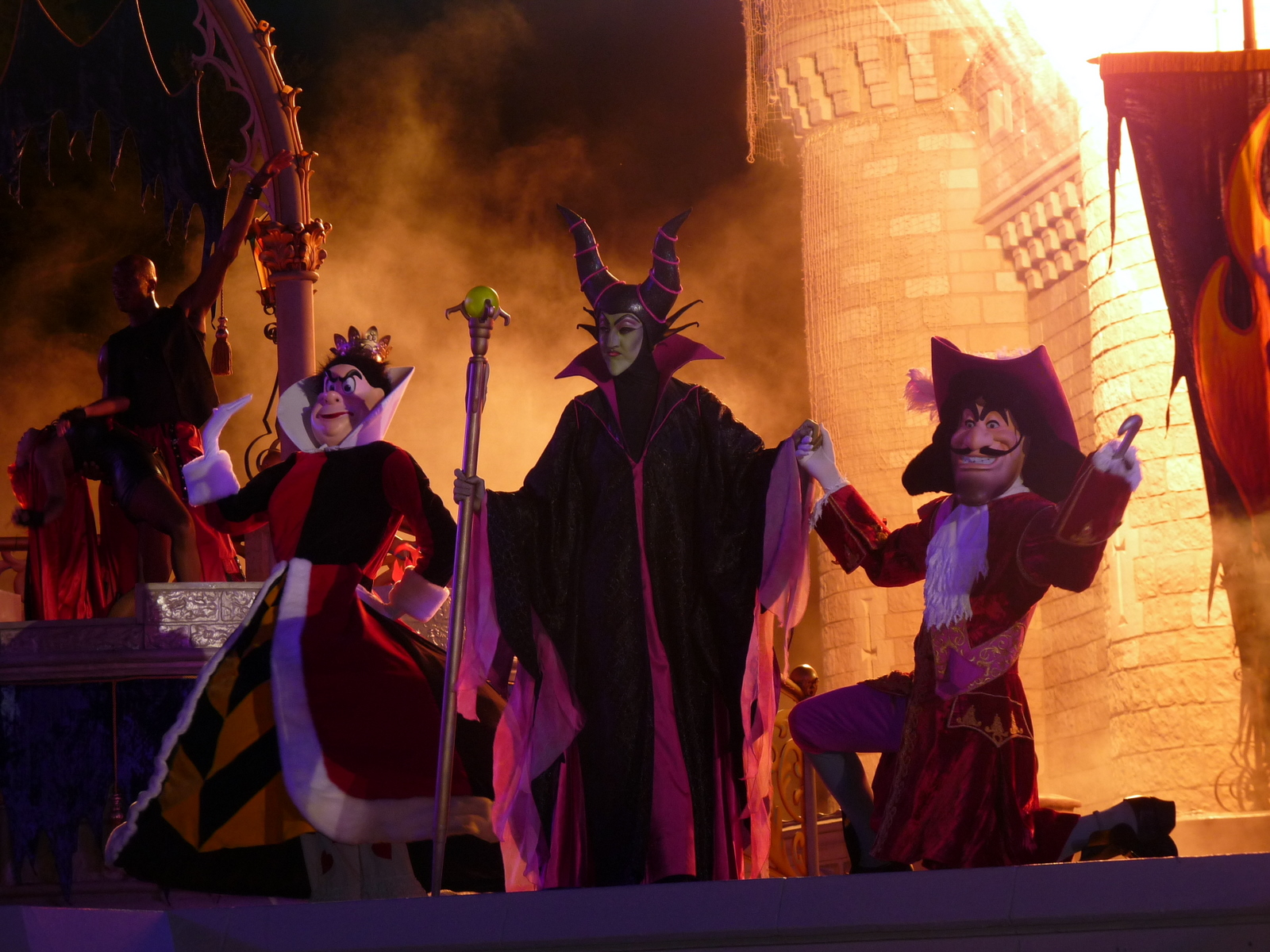
- Maleficent, the Queen of Hearts, and Captain Hook at Mickey's Not-So-Scary Halloween Party

Magic Kingdom
- Status: Operating
- Opening date: 1995

Disneyland Paris
- Name: The Not-So-Scary Party of Adventureland; French: La Fête Pas-Si-Trouille of Adventureland
- Area: Adventureland
- Status: Operating
- Opening date: 2008

Ride statistics
- Attraction type: Seasonal event
- Theme: Halloween
- Season: August–November
- Owner: Disney Parks
- Website: Official website

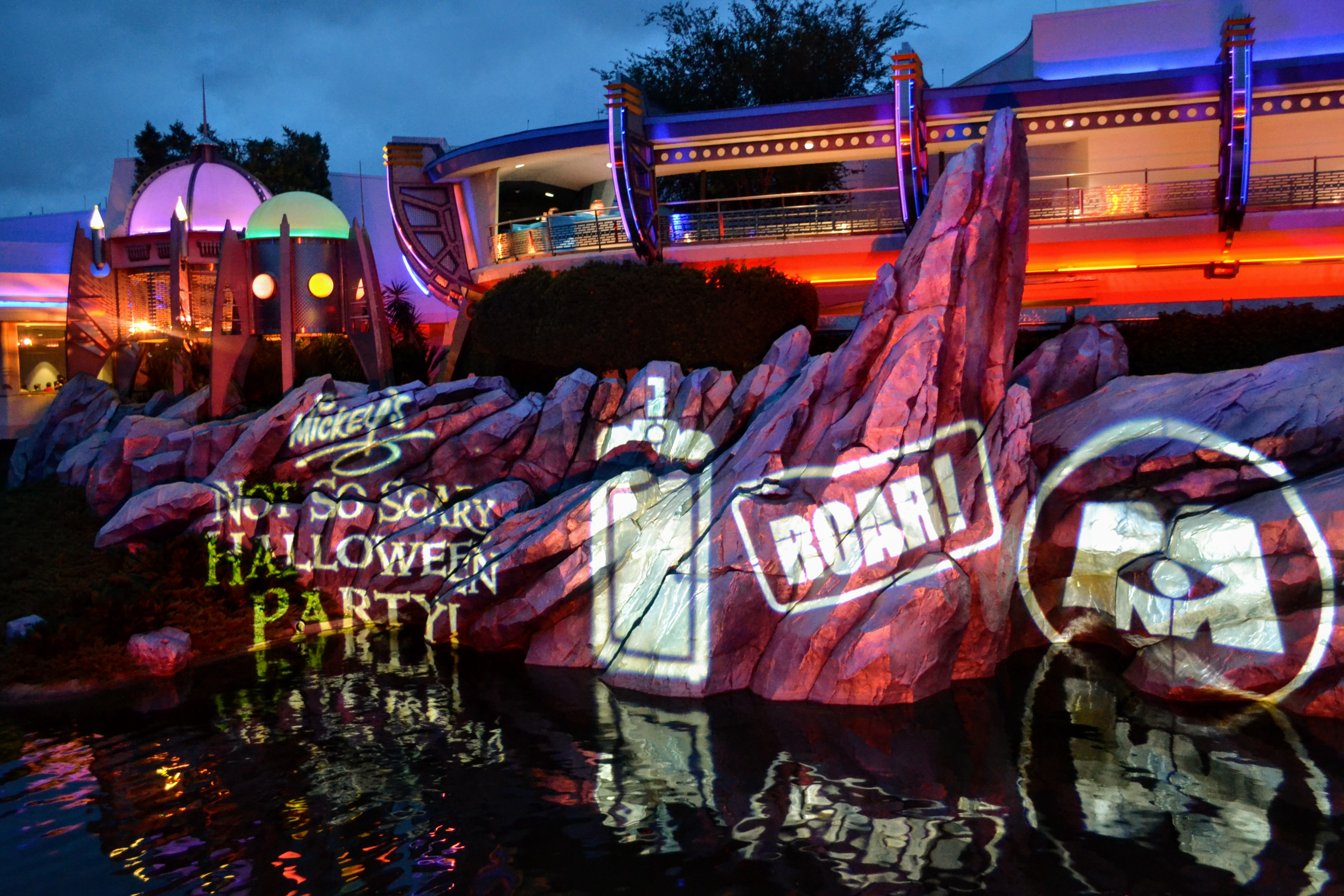

Mickey's Not-So-Scary Halloween Party (MNSSHP) is a separate-admission Halloween-themed event held annually during the months of August, September, October, and November at the Magic Kingdom theme park of the Walt Disney World Resort in Lake Buena Vista, Florida, near Orlando, and at Disneyland Paris outside Paris, France. The party began as a response to the Halloween Horror Nights event at Universal Studios Florida. Disney's event caters to a traditional family atmosphere, whereas Universal's has more of a "fright-centered" event with their monsters.

The event encourages guests to dress up in Halloween costumes and celebrate the season with themed events throughout the park. Regular park rules prohibit guests over the age of fourteen years from dressing in costume, but this rule is waived for the Halloween event, although adults dressed as a Disney character are prohibited from signing autographs or posing for pictures with other guests.

The event begins at 7pm on select nights but guests with a ticket for the event can enter Magic Kingdom beginning at 4pm.

In 2020, Disney cancelled all Mickey's Not-So-Scary Halloween Party celebrations due to delays and restrictions related to the COVID-19 pandemic. A smaller-scale event, Disney After Hours Boo Bash, replaced it for 2021. Mickey's Not-So-Scary Halloween Party returned to the Magic Kingdom on August 13, 2022.

== Walt Disney World ==
The event regularly takes place at Magic Kingdom mid-August until October 31 or November 1. In 2019, the event was dedicated in memory of Russi Taylor, Disney Legend and long-time voice actress of Minnie Mouse, who died earlier that year.

=== Trick-or-treating ===
Unlike regular hours, the events include trick-or-treating throughout the Magic Kingdom with special treat locations being identified by large inflatable towers. Guests are provided small trick-or-treat bags when they arrive and Mars' Wrigley sponsors the candy that is handed out.

=== Stage shows, meet and greets, and parties ===
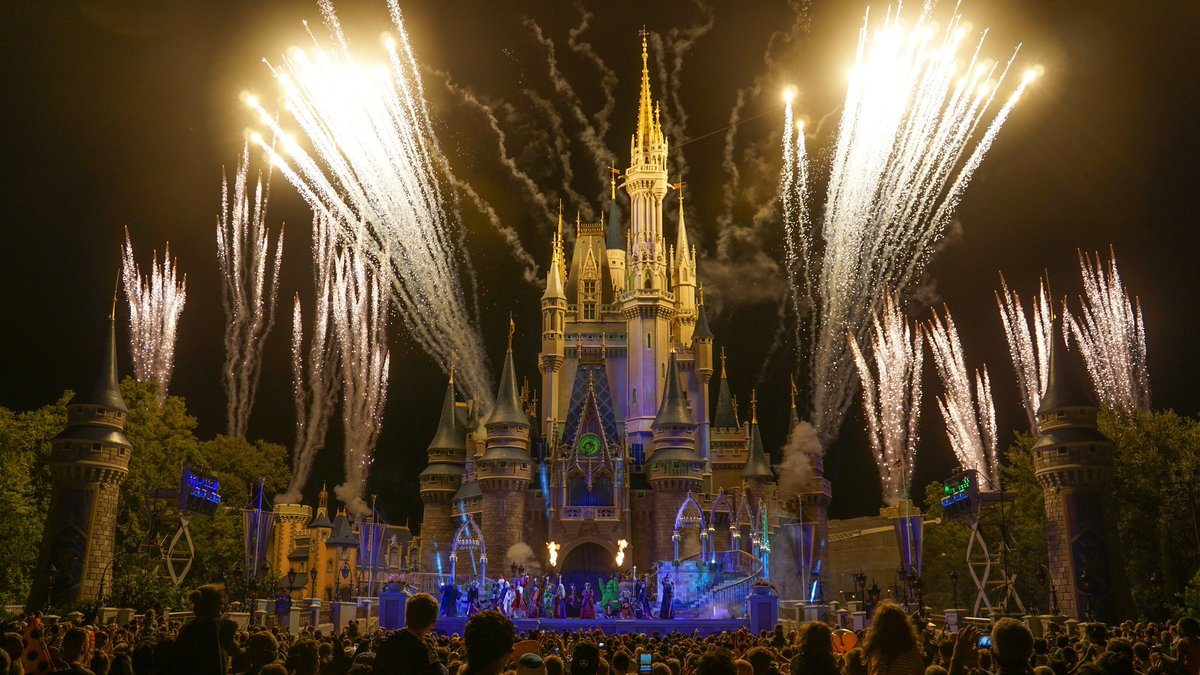
Finale of the Hocus Pocus Villain Spelltacular.

Originally, a stage show and meet-and-greet with animated Disney Villains led by Dr. Facilier titled The Disney Villains Mix and Mingle, was held at the Cinderella Castle Forecourt Stage. After the show, the villains dispersed to different areas of the park for meet and greet opportunities. The show ended in 2014. The following year, a new stage show titled Hocus Pocus Villain Spelltacular debuted in the same venue with Winifred Sanderson, Sarah Sanderson and Mary Sanderson from Hocus Pocus, as well as appearances from other Disney Villains. Keith David, Ken Page, Susanne Blakeslee, and Jason Marsden reprise their roles as the voices of Dr. Facilier from The Princess and the Frog, Oogie Boogie from Tim Burton's The Nightmare Before Christmas, Maleficent from Sleeping Beauty, and Thackery Binx from Hocus Pocus, respectively. Disney replaced pirate band Rusty Cutlass in Adventureland with a rotation of pirate shows beginning in 2026.

=== Mickey's Boo To You Halloween Parade ===
As is the norm at Disney theme parks, a parade and a fireworks show are the centerpieces of the event. The holiday-themed parade, entitled "Mickey's Boo To You Halloween Parade", features a pre-parade ride by the Headless Horseman from The Legend of Sleepy Hollow. The parade features various Disney characters (Mickey and Minnie, Donald and Daisy, Winnie the Pooh, Tigger and their friends) in Halloween costumes, Big Al, Shaker, and Wendell from The Country Bear Jamboree attraction, and a live-action version of the three hitchhiking ghosts from the Haunted Mansion attraction. The villains are also in the parade with a unit of their own. Besides the Haunted Mansion dancers, Hitchhiking Ghosts, the hoedown dancers, and the barn unit, the parade and soundtrack were changed in 2005.

In 2019, additional updates to the parade were made, including the addition of two new Tomorrowland-themed floats (one featuring Buzz Lightyear and alien explorers and the other with the Incredibles and Edna Mode) and a new spectral bride from the Haunted Mansion.

During the second parade, Cruella's Halloween Hideaway is available for an additional charge. This "party within a party" comes with reserved parade viewing plus themed savory and sweet food items and both alcoholic and non-alcoholic beverages.

=== Disney's Not So Spooky Spectacular! ===
The nighttime fireworks show, Disney's Not So Spooky Spectacular!, is presented in lieu of the regular nightly show, Happily Ever After. The show features fireworks, projection mapping, lasers, and searchlights at Cinderella Castle, and stars Jack Skellington (Chris Sarandon), Mickey Mouse (Bret Iwan), Minnie Mouse (Kaitlyn Robrock), Donald Duck (Tony Anselmo), and Goofy (Bill Farmer). The show debuted in 2019.

The current show serves as a replacement for Happy HalloWishes: A Grim Grinning Ghosts' Spooktacular in the Sky, which was based on the Haunted Mansion and featured dark music from the Disney library of animated films. Prior to that show's debut in 2005, a revival of the classic fireworks show, Fantasy in the Sky, was shown along with a three-minute holiday-themed finale featuring the Old Witch from Snow White and the seven dwarfs as the host of this Finale. The soundtrack for both the fireworks and parade are available on an in-park CD as of 2007 titled "Magic Kingdom Event Party Music", which also includes music from Mickey's Pirate and Princess Party.

During the fireworks, a special dessert party is available for an additional fee. This dessert party provides guests with reserved viewing of the fireworks along with themed treats and desserts.

== Disneyland Paris ==
For the first time ever, a Not-So-Scary Halloween Party took place outside the US in 2008. In October, Disneyland Paris hosted "Mickey's Not-So-Scary Halloween Party" (translated in French in "La Fête Pas-Si-Trouille of Adventureland"); these evenings offered access to several attractions, different shows especially created (Merlin and the Witch Academy, The Halloween Magician), and a Disco Party. Streetmospheres and Meet'n'Greet with Disney Characters gave the Park a special and spooky atmosphere.

For the second year, Disneyland Paris hosted once again four of these family-centered events on October 9, 16, 23, and 27, 2009. The first rumors announced a wider area than the previous year (including Adventureland, Fantasyland and Frontierland), and a new Villain Show could take place on the Central Hub Stage.

The idea of these events remains to bring more families to the park during their annual Halloween events with a separate ticket like their annual "Soirée Halloween Disney" ("Disney's Halloween Party"), which has been run on All Hallow's Eve since 1997, and is darker in tone than those in the US and Tokyo Disneyland, but not as scary than the Hong Kong Disneyland events.
