= Hocus Pocus 2 =

2022 film by Anne Fletcher

- Release poster
- Directed by: Anne Fletcher
- Screenplay by: Jen D'Angelo
- Story by: David Kirschner; Blake Harris; Jen D'Angelo
- Based on: Characters by: Mick Garris; David Kirschner
- Produced by: Lynn Harris
- Starring: Bette Midler; Sarah Jessica Parker; Kathy Najimy; Sam Richardson; Doug Jones; Whitney Peak; Belissa Escobedo; Tony Hale; Hannah Waddingham
- Cinematography: Elliot Davis
- Edited by: Julia Wong
- Music by: John Debney
- Production companies: Walt Disney Pictures; David Kirschner Productions; Weimaraner Republic Pictures
- Distributed by: Disney+
- Release date: September 30, 2022
- Running time: 104 minutes
- Country: United States
- Language: English
- Budget: $40 million

Hocus Pocus 2 is a 2022 American fantasy comedy film directed by Anne Fletcher, written by Jen D'Angelo and produced by Walt Disney Pictures. It is the second in the Hocus Pocus film series, and features Bette Midler, Sarah Jessica Parker, Kathy Najimy, and Doug Jones reprising their roles from the first film. Sam Richardson, Whitney Peak, Belissa Escobedo, Tony Hale, and Hannah Waddingham join the cast.

Filming took place from October 2021 to January 2022 at Chase Farm in Lincoln, Rhode Island. It was released on Disney+ on September 30, 2022. The film received mixed reviews from critics, and earned three nominations at the 75th Emmy Awards, including Outstanding Television Movie. A third film is in development.

== Plot ==
In 1653 Salem, Massachusetts, Reverend Traske banishes a 16-year-old Winifred Sanderson after she "defied church authority" by refusing to marry John Pritchett. Rather than be away from her sisters, Mary and Sarah, Winifred takes them to a forest. There, they meet the Mother Witch, who gives Winifred a magic book for her birthday; she also warns the trio against ever casting the Magicae Maxima spell, which makes the user "all-powerful". The Mother Witch teaches the trio how to keep their youth by using children. The sisters get revenge on the Reverend by cursing his home, which is engulfed in flames.

In 2022, 29 years after the sisters were resurrected by the Black Flame Candle, Salem teenagers Becca and Izzy prepare to celebrate Halloween and Becca's 16th birthday but turn down a party invite from their former friend, Cassie Traske. Becca and Izzy visit a magic shop, housed in the Sandersons' former cottage; the owner, Gilbert, gives Becca a candle for an annual birthday that is another Black Flame Candle. As there is a full moon and the girls are virgins, the candle resurrects the Sanderson sisters. The girls outwit the sisters in a Walgreens and flee to the magic shop, where they find that Gilbert tricked them into reviving the witches, having seen them on Halloween in 1993 and having read how to make the candle in the spell book.

The sisters catch up to the girls and see a campaign flyer belonging to Mayor Jefry Traske, Cassie's father and one of Reverend Traske's direct descendants. Winifred decides they will cast the Magicae Maxima spell to eliminate him and take revenge on modern Salem. The sisters trap Izzy and Becca in the basement and leave to hunt down the mayor, whose blood is needed to complete the spell. They force Gilbert to collect the other ingredients.

The girls escape and head to the Traske house to warn the mayor while the sisters find their way to the town's Halloween carnival and enchant the citizens to help them find the mayor. Meanwhile, Gilbert digs up Billy Butcherson, who has been entombed since 1993. He needs Billy's head for the spell but tricks him into helping him collect the other ingredients first. The girls reunite with Cassie and trap the sisters in a salt circle in Cassie's garage before Mayor Traske returns home. The three girls make up, but their reunion is interrupted when the sisters escape the circle and kidnap Cassie to use her blood instead. Becca and Izzy follow them to the forbidden forest where Gilbert has assembled the ingredients and discover that Becca, like the sisters, is a natural witch.

The sisters partially cast the spell and increase their power, but Becca distracts them while Izzy rescues Cassie. Becca convinces Book that it does not have to answer to Winifred, and she and Book flee into the forest. Book shows them the warning against the Magicae Maxima spell, stating that whoever casts it must give up what they cherish most as the price for the power. The girls agree to warn Winifred of the price of the spell but are too late, and she becomes all-powerful as Mary and Sarah fade to dust. Winifred begs the girls to use their newfound powers to save her sisters. While they cannot save them, Becca, Cassie, and Izzy join in a coven and cast a reuniting spell, so Winifred happily fades away to be with her sisters.

Gilbert and Billy rejoin the girls, and Billy starts to fade away, realizing that Winifred's spells have been undone. The girls decide to give Book a new home and continue practicing magic as they walk into the night. As they leave, a crow, identical to one that the Mother Witch shapeshifted into, flies overhead.

In a post-credit scene, it is revealed that inside Gilbert's shop there is another Black Flame Candle.

== Cast ==
- Bette Midler as Winifred "Winnie" Sanderson, the oldest of the three Sanderson sisters. As the leader of the trio, Winifred is often frustrated by her younger sisters' incompetence.
  - Taylor Paige Henderson as young Winifred Sanderson
- Sarah Jessica Parker as Sarah Sanderson, the youngest and most beautiful yet dim-witted of the three Sanderson sisters. Sarah's magical gift is a hypnotic siren call, which she uses to lure children.
  - Juju Brener as young Sarah Sanderson
- Kathy Najimy as Mary Sanderson, the middle of the three Sanderson sisters. Mary has the magical ability to track children with an enhanced sense of smell.
  - Nina Kitchen as young Mary Sanderson
- Whitney Peak as Becca, a high school student and aspiring witch who accidentally conjures the Sanderson Sisters on her 16th birthday.
- Belissa Escobedo as Izzy, Becca's best friend. She accidentally conjures the Sanderson Sisters with Becca.
- Lilia Buckingham as Cassie Traske, the Mayor's daughter and an estranged popular friend of Becca and Izzy
- Sam Richardson as Gilbert, the owner of the Olde Salem Magic Shoppe, the former home of the Sanderson Sisters
  - Jaylin Pryor as teen Gilbert
- Doug Jones as William "Billy" Butcherson, a former love interest of Winifred. She spitefully poisoned him when she caught him with her sister Sarah. He is raised from the dead as a zombie
  - Austin J. Ryan as young William "Billy" Butcherson
- Tony Hale as Jefry Traske, the Mayor of Salem and father of Cassie.
  - Hale also played Reverend Traske, Jefry and Cassie's 17th century ancestor
- Hannah Waddingham as the Mother Witch, a witch who gifts the spell book to the young Sanderson Sisters.
- Froy Gutierrez as Mike, Cassie's boyfriend
- Ginger Minj, Kornbread Jeté, and Kahmora Hall as drag queens impersonating Winifred, Mary, and Sarah, respectively, during a contest.

Amanda Shepherd, Norbert Weisser, Garry Marshall and Penny Marshall make uncredited appearances as Emily Binx, Mr. Binx, Master Devil and Medusa Lady through archive footage from the first film. Additionally, three stand-in extras portrayed Max Dennison, Dani Dennison and Allison Watts, the three protagonists of the first film, originally portrayed by Omri Katz, Thora Birch and Vinessa Shaw, in a flashback sequence narrated by Gilbert to the Sanderson Sisters. Skyla Sousa, Aiden Torres, and Emma Kaufman portray three teenage girls cosplaying as the Sanderson Sisters on Halloween.

== Production ==
=== Development ===
In July 2014, it was announced that The Walt Disney Company was developing a supernatural-themed film about witches and that Tina Fey was on board as a producer and star. However, Deadline Hollywood debunked rumors that the film was a sequel to Hocus Pocus. In November 2014, Bette Midler said in a Reddit "Ask Me Anything" that she was ready and willing to return for a sequel as Winifred Sanderson. She also said her co-stars Sarah Jessica Parker and Kathy Najimy were interested in reprising the roles of Sarah and Mary Sanderson as well, but stressed that Disney had yet to greenlight any sequel, encouraging fans of the original film to persuade Disney to make one. In November 2015, Midler stated in a Facebook Q&A that "after all these years and all the fan demand, I do believe I can stand and firmly say an unequivocal no" in response to a question about a sequel.

In June 2016, actor Doug Jones mentioned that Disney had been considering a sequel, and behind the scenes discussions were in place to possibly continue the series. In October 2016, while promoting her HBO series Divorce, Sarah Jessica Parker was asked by Andy Cohen about a sequel. Her response was "I would love that. I think we've been very vocal that we're very keen", yet she insisted that fans should encourage Disney to develop a sequel. In Hocus Pocus in Focus: The Thinking Fan's Guide to Disney's Halloween Classic, author Aaron Wallace identifies several potential approaches for a sequel, but notes that the project's biggest challenge is the Walt Disney Studios' interest in tentpole projects that promise very high box office returns.

In September 2017, Hocus Pocus writer Mick Garris admitted that he was working on a script for Hocus Pocus 2 after years of rumors and speculation and that it would potentially be developed as a television film for Disney Channel, Freeform or ABC. It was later confirmed that it would be instead a remake to air on Freeform, with The Royals writer Scarlett Lacey attached to write and the original film producer David Kirschner executive producing, with original director Kenny Ortega not expected to be involved. The following month, Midler said she was not fond of the idea of a remake and she would not be taking part in it regardless she was offered some kind of role or not, expressing doubts on how they would be able to successfully recast her role as Winifred Sanderson.

In February 2018, Jones revealed that there had been talks to do a sequel set twenty years after the original film and that he was approached to be involved on it, though he admitted that he was still interested on reprising his role as Billy Butcherson. In July 2018, a book titled Hocus Pocus and the All-New Sequel was released, containing a novelization of the film and a sequel story. The sequel focuses on Max and Allison's daughter, Poppy, who grew up hearing the family story of the original film and parents who avoid Halloween as much as possible. Poppy is skeptical of the tale and ends up in the Sanderson house on Halloween, twenty-five years to the day after the movie, in an attempt to prove there is nothing to the story.

In October 2019, a sequel was announced to be in development as a Disney+ exclusive film, with a screenplay written by Jen D'Angelo. In March 2020, Adam Shankman signed on to direct Hocus Pocus 2 concurrently to his work on the Enchanted sequel Disenchanted.

=== Casting ===
On November 1, 2019, Bette Midler, Sarah Jessica Parker, and Kathy Najimy expressed interest in reprising their roles as the Sanderson sisters in the sequel. In September 2020, Midler revealed that she has entered talks to return in the film as Winifred, and in October 2020, she said she would return alongside Parker and Najimy, though their returns were not officially confirmed until May 2021. In October 2021, it was announced that Taylor Paige Henderson had been cast as one of the three leads. Shortly afterwards, Sam Richardson was reported to be in final negotiations to join the cast in an undisclosed role. That same month, Tony Hale joined the cast as the mayor of Salem, Jefry Traske, and the full supporting cast was confirmed on October 31, 2021, including Hannah Waddingham and the return of Doug Jones, who portrayed William "Billy" Butcherson in the original film. In March 2022, it was announced that Thora Birch would not be reprising the role of Dani Dennison from the previous film. Birch later revealed she would have appeared in the film but was unable to due to a scheduling conflict. In the summer of that year, it was then announced that Sean Murray, Larry Bagby, Tobias Jelinek, Omri Katz, and Vinessa Shaw would also not be reprising their roles as Thackery Binx, Ice, Jay, Max, and Allison, respectively. In March 2023, during a Hocus Pocus reunion at the 2023 90's Con in Hartford, Connecticut, Birch, Shaw, Marsden, and Katz revealed that they were never contacted or considered for the sequel, and revealed there was a possibility for working their characters into the script before Disney decided to go in a different route for the sequel.

=== Pre-production ===
On October 29, 2020, Midler stated that a story outline for the sequel had been completed, which she praised as "pretty great" along with Najimy and Parker. On November 3, Midler revealed that the producers were trying to re-hire several members of the first film's production team that are alive and had not retired, as they felt much of the success of the first film came from the work of the behind-the-scenes team. In April 2021, Anne Fletcher replaced Shankman as the director due to his directing duties with Disenchanted, although he did remain as an executive producer on the film.

=== Filming ===
Production was scheduled to begin in the middle of 2021, in Salem, Massachusetts. In September 2021, sets for Hocus Pocus 2 were confirmed being built at Chase Farms in Lincoln, Rhode Island, and Washington Square in Newport, Rhode Island. Filming began on October 18, 2021, in Providence, Rhode Island, under the working title Black Flame. All scenes Samuel Skelton High School was shot in the Moses Brown School (exteriors) and in the La Salle Academy (interior).

Filming also took place on November 8, 2021, in Newport's Washington Square taking place in a modern Salem, Massachusetts. On December 10, 2021, filming began in Federal Hill, which was transformed with a Halloween-themed backdrop. On January 26, 2022, Midler confirmed that filming had completed.

== Music ==
In October 2021, it was announced that John Debney, the composer of the original film, was set to return to score the sequel. The soundtrack, which features two new songs in addition to Debney's score, was released digitally by Walt Disney Records on September 30, 2022, and was released physically on November 11, 2022.

== Marketing ==
The first teaser trailer was released on June 28, 2022. The teaser trailer reached 43.6 million views in its first 24 hours while on Twitter, the #HocusPocus became a top trend of the day on Twitter following the teaser's debut. The social media conversation was also the most gender balanced of the comps at 51 percent male and 49 percent female. On August 29, 2022, a first look at Doug Jones as Billy was released showing the character resurrected again by the Sanderson sisters. On September 9, 2022, the official trailer for the film premiered at the 2022 D23 Expo and was released online afterward. On September 21, 2022, the first look at RuPaul's Drag Race trio as the Sanderson Sisters plus a new brand poster were released. After the release of the film, in October, 2022, the Sanderson Sisters and other material based on the film were included in the video game Disney Magic Kingdoms for a Halloween Event focused on Hocus Pocus 2, although with the characters involved in a new storyline unrelated to the events of the film.

== Release ==
Hocus Pocus 2 was released on September 30, 2022, on Disney+.

The film made its broadcast-TV debut on October 6, 2024, as a part of Freeform's 31 Nights of Halloween line-up. The sequel also had subsequent airings on FX and ABC's Wonderful World of Disney.

== Reception ==
=== Viewership ===
According to market research company Parrot Analytics, which looks at consumer engagement in consumer research, streaming, downloads, and on social media, Hocus Pocus 2 was the most in-demand "horror" movie in the U.S., with demand 59.39 times the average movie, in the first four days of October. Whip Media, which tracks viewership data for the more than 21 million worldwide users of its TV Time app, reported that Hocus Pocus 2 was the most-streamed film in the U.S. from September 30 to October 2. It maintained strong rankings throughout October, including second place in the week of October 9, fourth place in the weeks of October 23 and October 30, and ninth place in the week of November 6. The streaming aggregator Reelgood, which tracks real-time data from 5 million U.S. users for original and acquired content across SVOD and AVOD services, reported the film as the most-streamed program in the U.S. for the week ending October 5.

The Walt Disney Company announced that Hocus Pocus 2 was its most-viewed film premiere in the U.S. within the first three days of release. Disney later reported it as the most-viewed film on Disney+ at that time. Whip Media also reported that Hocus Pocus 2 was the most-watched straight-to-streaming title of 2022 in its first three days. Nielsen Media Research, which records streaming viewership on certain American television screens, calculated that Hocus Pocus 2 was streamed for 2.725 billion minutes from September 26 to October 2, making it the second most-streamed film during that week. Hocus Pocus 2 recorded the largest opening weekend for a film in Nielsen's streaming rankings, with 2.7 billion minutes viewed following its September 30 premiere. It surpassed the previous record held by Encanto, which drew 2.2 billion minutes during its first three days, and Frozen 2, which registered 2.17 billion minutes following its debut on Disney+ on March 15. In the following week, Hocus Pocus 2 was streamed for 1.099 billion minutes, making it the most-streamed film for a second consecutive week.

=== Critical response ===
The review aggregator website Rotten Tomatoes reported an approval rating of 65% based on 157 reviews, with an average rating of 5.8/10. The website's critics consensus reads, "Hocus Pocus 2 is basically a boiling cauldron of nostalgia, but that's more than enough for this belated sequel to cast a reasonably effective spell." Metacritic gave it a weighted average score of 56 out of 100 based on 32 critics, indicating "mixed or average" reviews.

Ani Bundel of NBC News stated that the film is a joyful experience, appealing to both young children just discovering Halloween and teenagers who still enjoy family movies. However, Bundel emphasized that the film is primarily aimed at viewers aged 25 and older, whom Disney has spent the last two decades cultivating to appreciate a new installment of this emerging cult classic franchise. Claire Shaffer of The New York Times noted that, despite the film being a clear effort by Disney to bolster its Disney+ platform, it successfully captures the nostalgic charm of the original while also offering a creative update to its humor. Jennifer Green of Common Sense Media awarded the movie four out of five stars, praising its positive messages, role models, and diverse character representations. She described the film as a "campy but entertaining sequel." Amelia Emberwing of IGN rated the film 7 out of 10, noting that while the returning Sanderson sisters capture the magic of the original Hocus Pocus, and new characters provide fresh appeal, Hannah Waddingham's role was underutilized. Emberwing pointed out that despite some subpar greenscreen effects, the film retains a charming Disney Channel Original Movie feel.

Lovia Gyarkye of The Hollywood Reporter observed that the Sanderson sisters maintain their sharp wit and humor as they navigate modern-day Salem on Halloween, making playful remarks about contemporary life. However, Gyarkye noted that while they still embody a thirst for evil and a disdain for children, their edge is softened by the film's approach to toning down their villainous nature. Nell Minow of RogerEbert.com rated the film three and a half stars out of four, stating that Hocus Pocus 2 successfully appeals to fans of all generations. Minow noted that the sequel honors the original while incorporating modern updates and welcome diversity, reducing violence and adding a slightly sweeter tone. Jude Dry of IndieWire gave the sequel a "B-" score and described it as a "totally satisfactory" return for the Sanderson sisters, though the plot largely mirrors the original, with updated jokes. Dry noted that the sisters’ once sharp edge has softened, with the film leaning on a contrived sisterly bond to conclude the story. The review also pointed out that the script introduces a saccharine tone and an overt teen feminist message, suggesting that some elements might have been better left in the past.

Benjamin Lee of The Guardian rated the film two out of four stars, expressing disappointment in the sequel. Lee remarked that while Bette Midler returns alongside her child-killing sisters, the follow-up falls flat, largely due to its excessive efforts to soften the villains. Helen O'Hara of Empire rated the movie two out of five stars, criticizing it for being as unevenly plotted as the original while lacking the element of surprise. O'Hara remarked that the film is not "good" and suggested that there should be better options between its "gooey and ghoulish" tone.

=== Accolades ===
The film is one of the media that received the ReFrame Stamp for the years 2022 to 2023. The stamp is awarded by the gender equity coalition ReFrame and industry database IMDbPro for film and television projects that are proven to have gender-balanced hiring, with stamps being awarded to projects that hire female-identifying people, especially women of color, in four out of eight key roles for their production.

Year	Award	Category	Nominee	Result	Ref.
2022	Hollywood Music in Media Awards	Original Score – Streamed Live Action Film (No Theatrical Release)	John Debney	Nominated	
2022	People's Choice Awards	The Comedy Movie of 2022	Hocus Pocus 2	Nominated	
2022	Queerty Awards	Next Big Thing	Hocus Pocus 2	Won	
2023	Make-Up Artists and Hair Stylists Guild Awards	Best Period and/or Character Hair Styling	Cheryl R. Marks, Curtis William Foreman and Mandy Lyons	Nominated	
2023	Kids' Choice Awards	Favorite Movie	Hocus Pocus 2	Nominated	
2023	Kids' Choice Awards	Favorite Movie Actress	Sarah Jessica Parker	Nominated	
2024	Primetime Emmy Awards	Outstanding Television Movie	Hocus Pocus 2	Nominated	
2024	Primetime Emmy Awards	Outstanding Fantasy/Sci-Fi Costumes	Salvador Pérez Jr., Elizabeth Shelton and Gala Autumn	Nominated	
2024	Primetime Emmy Awards	Outstanding Music Composition for a Limited or Anthology Series, Movie or Special (Original Dramatic Score)	John Debney	Nominated	
2024	Astra TV Awards	Best Streaming Movie	Hocus Pocus 2	Nominated	
2024	Saturn Awards	Best Television Presentation	Hocus Pocus 2	Nominated	
2024	Artios Awards	Film, Non-Theatrical Release	Cathy Sandrich Gelfond, Amanda Mackey, Carolyn Pickman (Location Casting), Matt Bouldry (Location Casting), Kyle Crand (Location Casting) and Erica Berger (Associate Casting Director)	Nominated	

== Sequel ==
In October 2022, executive producer Adam Shankman stated that the storyline involving Becca allows for future projects, including potential spin-offs. By February 2023, Bette Midler stated that while nothing was official she was open to returning in a sequel. Kathy Najimy, Sarah Jessica Parker, Belissa Escobedo, and Lilia Buckingham as well as original film stars Omri Katz, Vinessa Shaw, and Jason Marsden each expressed interest in returning for a third installment. In June 2023, Sean Bailey, president of Walt Disney Studios Motion Picture Production, confirmed that a third film is in development, and planned for a release on Disney+. A few days later, Omri Katz expressed interest in reprising his role as Max Dennison for the third film only if asked by Disney. Later that month, it was announced that Anne Fletcher will once again serve as director, with a script written by Jen D'Angelo. In October 2023, D'Angelo confirmed that work on the script had already begun. In July 2024, Midler confirmed that the film was still in development. Later that same month, during an appearance on QVC's Busy This Week, she confirmed that she has not seen a script for the film yet, but has heard rumblings of one. The following year, in July 2025, Parker revealed on Watch What Happens Live with Andy Cohen that while the development progress on the movie was slow, conversations are currently ongoing to try to make it happen. On October 16, 2025, Tobias Jelinek, who played Jay Taylor in the original film, expressed his interest in reprising his role in the third film. Two days later, on October 18, during an appearance on Watch What Happens Live with Andy Cohen, Midler confirmed that there was a script for the movie, citing discussions, budget and rewrites talks were ongoing. Later that same month, Thora Birch, who played Dani Dennison in the original film, stated that she was "super open" to returning to her role in the third film. In May 2026, a third film was officially announced with Midler, Parker, and Najimy confirmed to reprise their roles.

== See also ==
- List of films about witchcraft
- List of films set around Halloween
