= Hocus Pocus (1993 film) =

1993 film by Kenny Ortega

- Theatrical release poster by Drew Struzan
- Directed by: Kenny Ortega
- Screenplay by: Mick Garris; Neil Cuthbert
- Story by: David Kirschner; Mick Garris
- Produced by: David Kirschner; Steven Haft
- Starring: Bette Midler; Sarah Jessica Parker; Kathy Najimy; Omri Katz; Thora Birch; Vinessa Shaw
- Cinematography: Hiro Narita
- Edited by: Peter E. Berger
- Music by: John Debney
- Production companies: Walt Disney Pictures; Touchwood Pacific Partners; David Kirschner Productions
- Distributed by: Buena Vista Pictures Distribution
- Release date: July 16, 1993
- Running time: 96 minutes
- Country: United States
- Language: English
- Budget: $28 million
- Box office: $53.2 million

Hocus Pocus is a 1993 American fantasy Halloween comedy film directed by Kenny Ortega from a screenplay by Mick Garris and Neil Cuthbert, and a story by David Kirschner and Garris. It follows a comically villainous trio of witches (Bette Midler, Sarah Jessica Parker, and Kathy Najimy) who are inadvertently resurrected by a teenage boy (Omri Katz) in Salem, Massachusetts, on Halloween night.

The film was released in North America on July 16, 1993, by Walt Disney Pictures. Upon its original release, it received mixed reviews from critics and was initially a box-office bomb, possibly losing Disney around $16.5 million during its theatrical run. However, largely through many annual airings on Disney Channel and Freeform (formerly ABC Family, Fox Family, and The Family Channel) all throughout the month of October, Hocus Pocus has been rediscovered by audiences, resulting in a yearly spike in home media sales of the film every Halloween season. The annual celebration of Halloween has helped make the film a cult classic.

The film spawned a franchise, consisting of a sequel novelization, a theme park attraction, a TV special, and even a short film. A sequel, Hocus Pocus 2, written by Jen D'Angelo and directed by Anne Fletcher, was released on September 30, 2022, on Disney+, with a third film currently in the works.

== Plot ==
On October 31, 1693, in Salem, Massachusetts, Thackery Binx discovers that his younger sister Emily has been abducted by the three witches Winifred, Mary and Sarah Sanderson. Binx confronts the Sanderson sisters at their cottage, but not in time to save Emily, whose life force they have drained to keep themselves young. The witches punish Binx for interfering by turning him into an immortal black cat, so he must live forever with his guilt. Binx's friend Elijah rallies the townsfolk to apprehend the Sandersons; they are condemned to death, but Winifred casts a curse during the hanging, claiming that a virgin will light the Black-Flame Candle in the cottage on a day when the full moon and All Hallows' Eve coincide, resurrecting the sisters. Binx vows to thwart the witches' plans when they return.

Three centuries later, teenage Max Dennison, who has recently moved to Salem from Los Angeles, reluctantly takes his younger sister Dani out trick-or-treating. They meet up with his new classmate Allison Watts, on whom he has a crush. Max, Dani, and Allison visit the former Sanderson cottage, which is now an abandoned museum. Max, who believes the story of the witches is "hocus pocus", inadvertently resurrects the witches by lighting the Black-Flame Candle. The witches attempt to suck out Dani's soul, but Max intervenes. Binx arrives and reveals that he can talk; following Binx's instructions, Max steals Winifred's spellbook, and the children flee to a cemetery, which the witches cannot step into as it is hallowed ground. From a distance, Winifred raises her former fiancé, Billy Butcherson, from his grave and sends him after the children, forcing them to leave the cemetery. Winifred also reveals to her sisters that, unless they can suck the life out of at least one child, the three of them will turn to dust when the sun rises.

Max, Dani, and Allison hurry to a Halloween party that most of the town's adults are attending. Max tries to warn his parents and the other adults of the danger, but the witches take the stage and use a performance of "I Put a Spell on You" to enchant the partying adults to dance until they die. Binx and the three children then lure the witches into the local high school's pottery kiln and burn them alive; the witches temporarily disintegrate, but the curse revives them after the children have gone.

Not realizing that the witches have survived, Max and Allison open the spellbook, hoping to reverse the curse on Binx. This action allows the witches to find the children, abduct Binx and Dani, and retrieve the spellbook. Sarah uses her siren-like singing to mesmerise all of Salem's children, luring them to the Sanderson cottage; however, Max and Allison rescue Dani and Binx by briefly tricking the witches into believing that the sun has risen an hour early.

Back at the cemetery, Billy catches up to the children, cuts open his stitched mouth with Max's knife, and reveals that he hates Winifred and is on their side. The witches snatch Dani back after attacking the children from the air, and Winifred attempts to use their last vial of potion to suck out Dani's life force. Binx attacks Winifred to make her drop the potion, resulting in her throwing him to the ground near Emily's grave. Max catches and drinks the potion to save Dani. Winifred takes Max on her broomstick to suck out his life force, and the two of them fight in mid-air. The rest of the party fend off Mary and Sarah, while Max and Winifred fall off the broom into the hallowed ground of the cemetery, causing Winifred to turn to stone. The sun rises, turning Mary and Sarah into dust, with Winifred's stone body also exploding into dust shortly after. With the witches vanquished, Billy gratefully returns to his grave to sleep while, at the same time, Binx dies in his cat form. Dani discovers the body of Binx and begins to weep, but his spirit, now free and returned to human form due to the curse being broken, thanks the children. Emily's spirit then appears to escort her brother to the afterlife.

In a mid-credits scene, the enchanted adults are freed from the spell and leave the Halloween party, exhausted from dancing all night. The bullies Jay and Ice who are trapped in the Sanderson museum still wait in their cages to be freed, while the living eye on the witches' spellbook opens and looks around, suggesting the Sanderson Sisters may return.

== Cast ==
- Bette Midler as Winifred "Winnie" Sanderson, the buck-toothed eldest of the sisters, and the most intelligent and powerful witch in the family
- Sarah Jessica Parker as Sarah Sanderson, the most beautiful but dim-witted sister and youngest witch who uses her siren-like voice to lure in children
- Kathy Najimy as Mary Sanderson, the middle sister who can smell out children
- Omri Katz as Maximilian "Max" Dennison, a sarcastic and smart-aleck virgin teenager from Los Angeles who has recently moved to Salem, Massachusetts
- Thora Birch as Danielle "Dani" Dennison, Max's 8-year-old snarky sister who loves Halloween
- Vinessa Shaw as Allison Watts, Max's love interest and classmate
- Charles Rocket as David "Dave" Dennison, Max and Dani's father
- Stephanie Faracy as Jennifer "Jenny" Dennison, Max and Dani's mother
- Sean Murray as Thackery Binx, a kindhearted intelligent teenage boy from 1693 cursed to live as an immortal black cat
  - Jason Marsden as voice of Thackery Binx
- Kathleen Freeman as Miss Olin, a teacher at Jacob Bailey High School
- Doug Jones as William "Billy" Butcherson, Winifred's love interest who was poisoned by her in 1693 and resurrected as a zombie 300 years later. Karyn Malchus performs Billy when headless.
- Amanda Shepherd as Emily Binx, Thackery's little sister and 1693 victim of the Sanderson sisters
- Larry Bagby as Ernie "Ice", a teenage bully in 20th-century Salem
- Tobias Jelinek as Jay, a teenage bully in 20th-century Salem and Ice's best friend
- Steve Voboril as Elijah Morris, a friend of Thackery's in 1693
- Norbert Weisser as Mr. Binx, Thackery and Emily's father in 1693
- Joseph Malone as a singer at the party
- Jordan Redmond as The Little Angel
- Garry Marshall as Master Devil (uncredited), an unsuspecting homeowner in 20th-century Salem
- Penny Marshall as Medusa Lady (uncredited), an unsuspecting homeowner in 20th-century Salem

== Production ==
=== Development ===
In the 1994 TV documentary Hocus Pocus: Begin the Magic, and on the film's Blu-ray release, producer David Kirschner explains how he came up with the idea for the film one night. He and his young daughter were sitting outside and his neighbor's black cat strayed by. Kirschner invented a tale of how the Sanderson Sisters came about, stemming from the Winifred Brood.

Hocus Pocus started life as a script by Mick Garris, that was bought by Walt Disney Pictures in 1984. The film's working title was Disney's Halloween House; it was much darker and scarier, and its protagonists were all 12-year-olds. Garris and Kirschner pitched it to Steven Spielberg's Amblin Entertainment; Spielberg saw Disney as a competitor to Amblin in the family film market at the time and refused to co-produce a film with his "rival."

=== Writing ===
Various rewrites were made to the script to make the film more comedic and made two of its young protagonists into teenagers; however, production was stalled several times until 1992, when Bette Midler expressed interest in the script and the project immediately went forward.

=== Casting ===
While Cloris Leachman was originally considered for the role of Winifred Sanderson, the part was eventually given to Bette Midler. Midler stated that Hocus Pocus "was the most fun I'd had in my career up to that point".

Ortega met with Leonardo DiCaprio about playing the role of Max after being "impressed" by his audition but he was too busy to take on the role as he was working on What's Eating Gilbert Grape. Rosie O'Donnell was offered the role of Mary Sanderson but she declined as she did not want to play a mean witch.

=== Filming ===
The film is set in Salem, Massachusetts, but most of it was shot on sound stages in Burbank, California. However, its daytime scenes were filmed in Salem and Marblehead, Massachusetts, during two weeks of filming with the principal cast.

Pioneer Village, a recreation of early-colonial Salem, was used for the opening scenes set in 1693. Other locations included Old Burial Hill in Marblehead, where Max is accosted by Ice and Jay, the Old Town Hall in Salem, where the town Halloween party takes place, and Phillips Elementary School, where the witches are trapped in a kiln. The exterior of Max and Dani's house is a private residence on Ocean Avenue in Salem.

== Music ==
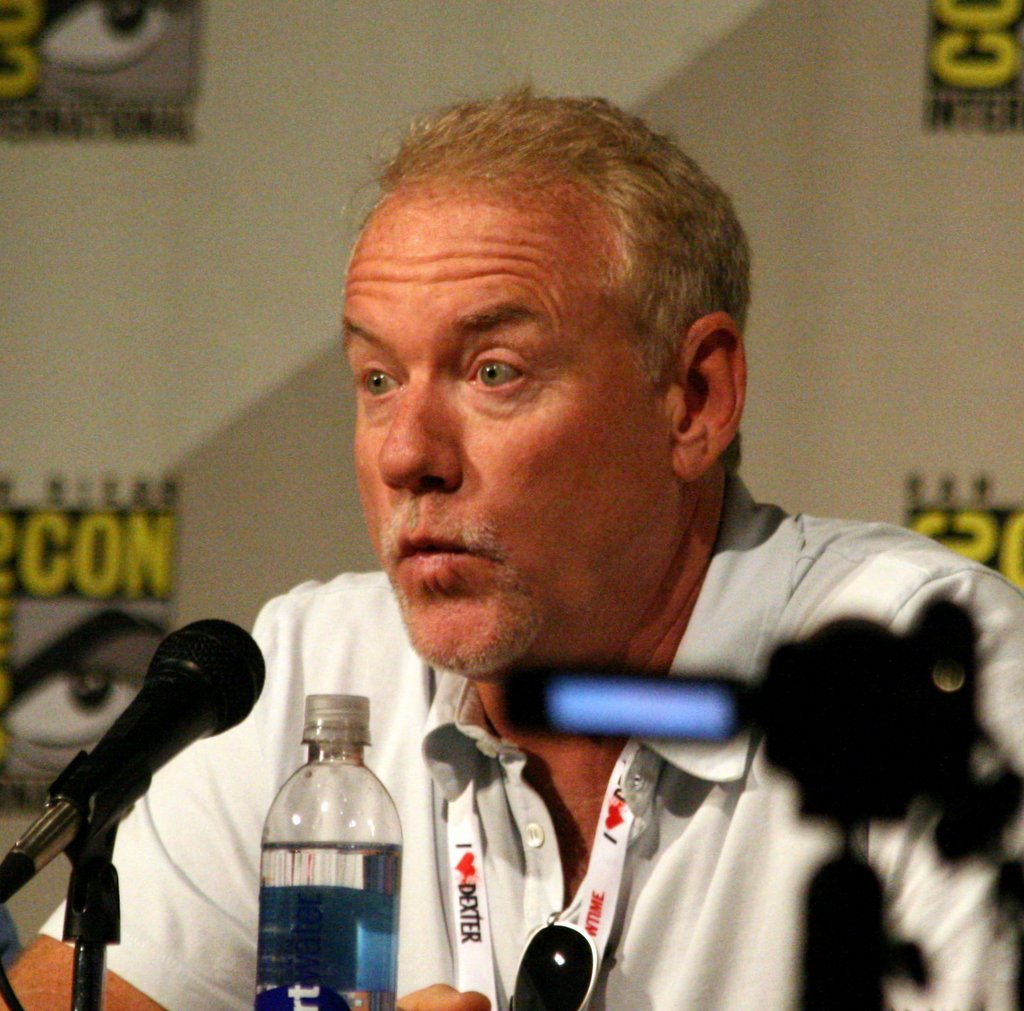
John Debney composed the film's score.

The musical score for Hocus Pocus was composed and conducted by John Debney. James Horner was originally slated to score the film, but became unavailable at the last minute, so Debney had to score the entire film in two weeks. Even though he did not score the film, Horner came back to write the theme for Sarah (sung by Sarah Jessica Parker, more commonly known as "Come Little Children") which is featured in Intrada's Complete Edition of the score.

Debney released a promotional score through the internet containing 19 tracks from the film. Bootlegs were subsequently released across the internet, primarily because the promotional release missed the entire opening sequence music.

=== Songs ===
- "Sarah's Theme" – music by James Horner; lyrics by Brock Walsh; performed by Sarah Jessica Parker
- "I Put a Spell on You" – written by Jay Hawkins and produced and arranged by Marc Shaiman; performed by Bette Midler
- "Witchcraft" – written by Cy Coleman, Carolyn Leigh; performed by Joe Malone
- "I Put a Spell on You" – written by Jay Hawkins; performed by Joe Malone
- "Sabre Dance" – written by Aram Khachaturian, arranged by George Wilson
- Chants and Incantations – conceived and written by Brock Walsh

== Release ==
The film was theatrically released by Walt Disney Pictures in the United States and Canada on July 16, 1993. The film received mixed reviews from film critics at the time of its release. was not a critical or commercial success upon its release, possibly losing Disney around $16.5 million during its theatrical run. However, largely through many annual airings on Disney Channel and Freeform (formerly ABC Family) all throughout the month of October, Hocus Pocus has been rediscovered by audiences, resulting in a yearly spike in home video sales of the film every Halloween season. The annual celebration of Halloween has helped make this film a cult classic.

=== Home media ===
Walt Disney Home Video released the film on VHS and LaserDisc in the United States and Canada on January 5, 1994. and later to DVD on June 4, 2002. Following the film's release on DVD, it has continued to show strong annual sales, raking in more than $1 million in DVD sales each October. In the mid-to-late 1990s, the film was rebroadcast annually all throughout October on ABC and Disney Channel before switching over to ABC Family's 13 Nights of Halloween lineup in the 2010s. The film has continuously brought record viewing numbers to the lineup, including a 2009 broadcast watched by 2.5 million viewers. In 2011, an October 29 airing became the lineup's most watched program, with 2.8 million viewers. On September 4, 2012, the film was released on Blu-ray. Disney re-released the film on Blu-ray and Digital HD on September 2, 2018, as part of the film's 25th anniversary. The new release contains special features, including deleted scenes and a behind-the-scenes retrospective. On 15 September 2020, the film was released on Ultra HD Blu-ray in 4K resolution with HDR. The movie has grossed $40,627,466 in domestic weekly DVD sales and $16,588,298 in weekly Blu-ray sales in the United States.

Hocus Pocus was made available to stream on Disney+ at launch. Whip Media, which tracks viewership data for the more than 25 million worldwide users of its TV Time app, calculated that Hocus Pocus was the seventh most-streamed movie in the U.S. during the week of October 31, 2021. It ranked second from September 30 to October 2, 2022, seventh during the week of October 9, 2022, and ninth during the week of October 23, 2022.

== Reception ==
=== Box office ===
Hocus Pocus was released July 16, 1993, and came in fourth place on its opening weekend behind Jurassic Park, In the Line of Fire and The Firm, grossing $8.1 million. It dropped from the top ten ranking after two weeks of release. The film was released the same day as Free Willy. According to Kirschner, Disney chose to release Hocus Pocus in July to take advantage of children being off school for the summer.

In October 2020, amid the COVID-19 pandemic, Hocus Pocus was re-released in 2,570 theaters. It made $1.9 million over the weekend, finishing second behind Tenet. The following two weekends it made $1.2 million and $756,000, respectively.

=== Critical response ===
On review aggregator Rotten Tomatoes, Hocus Pocus has an approval rating of 42% based on 65 reviews. The website's critical consensus reads, "Harmlessly hokey yet never much more than mediocre, Hocus Pocus is a muddled family-friendly effort that fails to live up to the talents of its impressive cast." Metacritic assigned the film a weighted average score of 43 out of 100, based on 27 critics, indicating "mixed or average" reviews. Audiences polled by CinemaScore gave the film an average grade of "B+" on an A+ to F scale.

Gene Siskel, reviewing for The Chicago Tribune, remarked that the film was a "dreadful witches' comedy with the only tolerable moment coming when Bette Midler presents a single song". Roger Ebert in The Chicago Sun-Times gave the film one star out of a possible four, writing that it was "a confusing cauldron in which there is great activity but little progress, and a lot of hysterical shrieking". The Miami Herald called it "a pretty lackluster affair", adding this comment: "Despite the triple-threat actress combo, Hocus Pocus won't be the Sister Act of 1993. There are a lot of gotta-sees this summer, and this isn't one of them."

Janet Maslin of The New York Times wrote that the film "has flashes of visual stylishness but virtually no grip on its story". Ty Burr of Entertainment Weekly gave the film a C−, calling it "acceptable scary-silly kid fodder that adults will find only mildly insulting. Unless they're Bette Midler fans. In which case it's depressing as hell"; and stating that while Najimy and Parker "have their moments of ramshackle comic inspiration, and the passable special effects should keep younger campers transfixed [...] [T]he sight of the Divine Miss M. mugging her way through a cheesy supernatural kiddie comedy is, to say the least, dispiriting." Kim Newman of Empire gave the film two stars out of five, writing, "Trying to break expectations isn't always a wise idea and here Disney show how not to do it. With this supposed-family movie, they disappoint on nearly every level. The plot is weak, the action poor and it's got Bette Midler, simply dreadful."

=== Accolades ===
Year	Award	Category	Nominee(s)	Result
1993	Awards Circuit Community Awards	Best Costume Design	Mary E. Vogt	Nominated
1993	Awards Circuit Community Awards	Best Makeup & Hairstyling	John M. Elliott Jr., John Calpin and Steve La Porte	Nominated
1994	Saturn Awards	Best Actress	Bette Midler	Nominated
1994	Saturn Awards	Best Costumes	Mary E. Vogt	Won
1994	Saturn Awards	Best Fantasy Film	Hocus Pocus	Nominated
1994	Saturn Awards	Best Special Effects	Buena Vista Visual Effects, Matte World Digital, Rhythm & Hues	Nominated
1994	Saturn Awards	Best Supporting Actress	Kathy Najimy	Nominated
1994	Saturn Awards	Best Supporting Actress	Sarah Jessica Parker	Nominated
1994	Youth in Film Awards	Best Youth Actor in a Voice-Over Role: TV or Movie	Jason Marsden	Nominated
1994	Youth in Film Awards	Best Youth Actor Leading Role in a Motion Picture: Comedy	Omri Katz	Nominated
1994	Youth in Film Awards	Best Youth Actor Leading Role in a Motion Picture: Comedy	Sean Murray	Nominated
1994	Youth in Film Awards	Best Youth Actress Leading Role in a Motion Picture: Comedy	Thora Birch	Won (Note: Tied with Christina Vidal for Life with Mikey)
1994	Youth in Film Awards	Best Youth Actress Leading Role in a Motion Picture: Comedy	Vinessa Shaw	Nominated

== Legacy ==
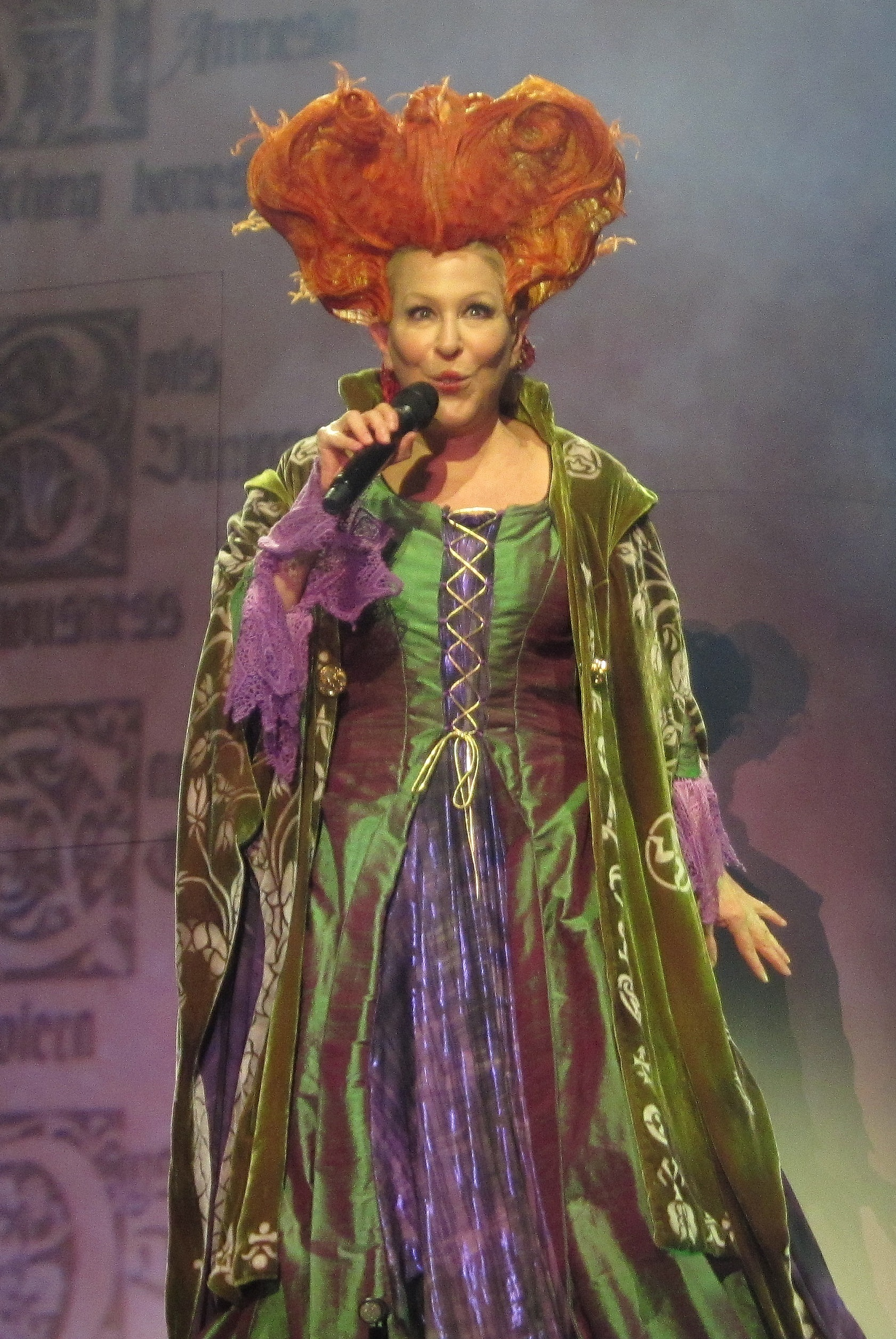
Midler dressed as Winifred Sanderson during her Divine Intervention Tour in 2015

Over the years, the film has achieved cult status. In its 25th anniversary year in 2018, the first week of Hocus Pocus viewings on Freeform averaged 8.2 million viewers. A special called the "Hocus Pocus 25th Anniversary Halloween Bash" was filmed at the Hollywood Forever Cemetery and features interviews with members of the cast, including Bette Midler, Sarah Jessica Parker, and Kathy Najimy, as well as a costume contest hosted by Sharon and Kelly Osbourne. It aired on Freeform October 20, 2018.

In October 2011, the Houston Symphony celebrated various horror and Halloween classics, including Hocus Pocus, with "The Hocus Pocus Pops". On October 19, 2013, D23 held a special screening of Hocus Pocus at the Walt Disney Studios in Burbank, California, to honor the 20th anniversary of the film. Nine of the cast and crew gathered for the screening, and hundreds of D23 members attended. Returning members included Kathy Najimy, David Kirschner, Thora Birch, Doug Jones, Vinessa Shaw, and Omri Katz.

During her Divine Intervention Tour in 2015, Bette Midler appeared on stage dressed as Winifred Sanderson. Her Harlettes appeared with her dressed as Mary and Sarah, and the three of them performed the film's version of "I Put a Spell on You."

On September 15, 2015, the Hocus Pocus Villain Spelltacular was introduced at the Magic Kingdom as a part of Mickey's Not-So-Scary Halloween Party. The show introduces new actresses as the Sanderson Sisters who try to make a villain party and summon or attract various Disney villains in the process. In September 2016, entertainment critic Aaron Wallace published Hocus Pocus in Focus: The Thinking Fan's Guide to Disney's Halloween Classic, the first full-length book written about the film. The book includes a foreword by Thora Birch and afterword by Mick Garris. Billed as a "lighthearted but scholarly look at the film", the book analyzes the film's major themes, which it identifies as festivity, nostalgia, home, horror, virginity, feminism, Broadway-style musical moments, sibling rivalry, "Spielbergian" filmmaking style, Disney villain traditions, and more. Wallace also analyzes Walt Disney World's Hocus Pocus Villain Spelltacular as part of the film's legacy and includes "the largest collection of Hocus Pocus fun facts and trivia ever assembled", complete with extensive endnote citations.

The City of Salem has celebrated its connection to Hocus Pocus, while local filming sites have become an attraction for fans as the film's legacy has grown over the years. In 2018, the Haunted Happenings Grand Parade, an annual Salem festival held every October, was Hocus Pocus-themed in honor of the film's 25th anniversary. A representative for Destination Salem also reported a huge uptick in tourism for the 25th anniversary year, stating: "There's always been a 'Hocus Pocus' component to the visitors to Salem, especially in October. But it's like the film's following grows every year.”

The cast reunited for "In Search of the Sanderson Sisters: A Hocus Pocus Hulaween Takeover", which aired on October 30, 2020. The one-hour broadcast was virtual due to the COVID-19 pandemic, and the proceeds went to the New York Restoration Project. Members of the cast who participated were Bette Midler, Sarah Jessica Parker, Kathy Najimy, Thora Birch, Omri Katz, Vinessa Shaw, and Doug Jones. Other notable participants of the benefit included Meryl Streep, Mariah Carey, Cassandra Peterson, Glenn Close, Billy Crystal, Jamie Lee Curtis, Todrick Hall, Jennifer Hudson, Anjelah Johnson-Reyes, Michael Kors, Adam Lambert, George Lopez, Alex Moffat, Martin Short, Sarah Silverman, John Stamos, Kenan Thompson, Sophie von Haselberg, and Bella Hadid.

In 2022, Disney Channel ran a short titled Hocus Pocus: As Told By Chibi. This continues the trend started by Big Hero 6: The Series shorts spin-off Big Chibi 6 The Shorts and continued with Amphibia, Phineas and Ferb, Halloweentown, Big City Greens, DuckTales, Tangled: The Series, Descendants, Moana, Zombies, The Ghost and Molly McGee, High School Musical, The Owl House, and Hamster & Gretel as Chibi Tiny Tales. The short was released on October 15, 2022, simplifies the plot of the first Hocus Pocus.

The Sanderson Sisters appear as playable characters in Disney video games such as Disney Magic Kingdoms and Disney Heroes: Battle Mode.

In 2023, Disney re-released the film in select theaters on October 6 to commemorate its 30th anniversary. In 2024, Disney re-released the film in select theaters again on October 18 to celebrate its 30th anniversary and the growing popularity of the movie.

=== Sequels ===
In a November 2014 interview, Bette Midler said that she was ready and willing to return for a sequel, and she also said that her co-stars Sarah Jessica Parker and Kathy Najimy were also interested in returning for a sequel. Midler stressed the fact that Disney had yet to greenlight any sequel. In October 2016, Sarah Jessica was asked the prospects of a sequel and said "I would love that. I think we've been very vocal that we're very keen."

In October 2019, a sequel which was going to be developed as a Disney+ exclusive film was announced, with a screenplay which was written by Jen D'Angelo. Midler, Parker, and Najimy all confirmed their interest in reprising their roles. In March 2020, Adam Shankman signed on to direct. In May 2021, it was confirmed that Midler, Parker, and Najimy would reprise their roles as the Sanderson Sisters and it was announced that the film would be released in 2022. The film was released on September 30, 2022.

Hocus Pocus 3 was officially announced in May 2026, with Midler, Parker, and Najimy confirmed to reprise their roles.

=== Possible musical adaptation ===
During an interview on The Big Seance Podcast in September 2021, creator David Kirschner revealed that a Broadway adaptation of the original film is in development. During an interview leading up to the release of Hocus Pocus 2 in September 2022, he stated that "I just want to pinch myself, and I'm just afraid that I'm going to be nine years old and on a Little League field again. But it's just so wonderful just to stand back and watch all of this ... I think you're going to be very pleased." Kenny Ortega revealed to Forbes in 2020 his interest in possibly returning to direct the production, saying "I think a Hocus Pocus musical would be great fun, really great fun."

== See also ==
- List of films about witchcraft
- List of films set around Halloween
- List of American films of 1993
