= Omri Katz =

American actor (born 1976)

- עמרי חיים כץ
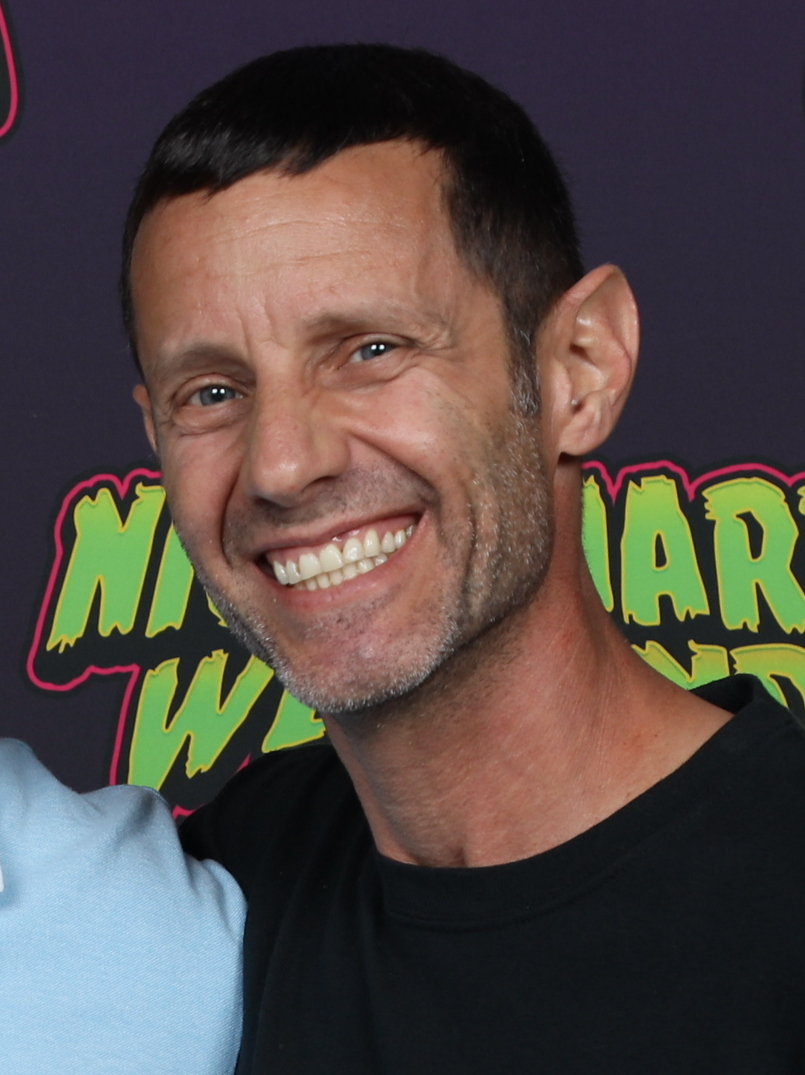
- Katz at Nightmare Weekend Richmond in 2023
- Born: Omri Haim Katz; May 30, 1976 (age 50); Los Angeles, California, U.S.
- Occupation: Actor
- Years active: 1983–2002

Omri Haim Katz (Hebrew: עמרי חיים כץ; born May 30, 1976) is an American retired actor. His television and film credits include the television series Dallas and Eerie, Indiana, and the movies Matinee, Adventures in Dinosaur City, and Hocus Pocus.

== Biography ==
Omri Haim Katz was born on May 30, 1976, (Note: Katz' birthday is May 30. He was 46 years old on October 27, 2022. His full birthdate, May 30, 1976, is calculated from these two facts.) to Israeli Jewish immigrants Yoram and Rina Katz. He has an older brother named Michael and an older sister named Lali. Katz resided in Israel for a year during his childhood. He has worked as a hairdresser.

== Filmography ==
=== Film ===
Year	Title	Role	Notes	Ref.
1993	Matinee	Stan		
1993	Hocus Pocus	Max Dennison		
2002	Journey Into Night	Sean	Short film	

=== Television ===
Year	Title	Role	Notes	Ref.
1983–1991	Dallas	John Ross Ewing III	Main cast (149 episodes)	
1984	Simon & Simon	Boy	Episode: "Yes, Virginia, There Is a Liberace"	
1991–1992	Eerie, Indiana	Marshall Teller	Main cast (19 episodes)	
1991	Zorro	Jack Adams	Episode: "The Man Who Cried Wolf"	
1991	Adventures in Dinosaur City	Timmy	TV film	
1992	The Torkelsons	Jason	Episode: "Double Date"	
1993–1995	The John Larroquette Show	Tony Hemingway	Recurring role (6 episodes)	
1996	Dallas: J.R. Returns	John Ross Ewing III	TV film	
1999	Freaks and Geeks	Brad	Episode: "Tests and Breasts"	
2000	General Hospital	Tattoo Artist	Episode dated April 26, 2000	

== Awards ==
Award	Year	Category	Work	Result
Soap Opera Digest Award	1984	Outstanding Youth Actor in a Prime-Time Soap Opera	Dallas	Won
Soap Opera Digest Award	1987	Outstanding Youth Actor/Actress on a Prime Time Serial	Dallas	Nominated
Young Artist Award	1984	Best Young Actor in a Daytime or Nighttime Television Series	Dallas	Nominated
Young Artist Award	1986	Exceptional Performance by a Young Actor in a Long Running Series Comedy or Drama	Dallas	Nominated
Young Artist Award	1987	Best Young Actor Starring in a Television Drama Series	Dallas	Nominated
Young Artist Award	1992	Best Young Actor Starring in a Television Series	Eerie, Indiana	Nominated
Young Artist Award	1994	Best Youth Actor Leading Role in a Motion Picture Comedy	Hocus Pocus	Nominated
