= Kathy Najimy =

American actress (born 1957)

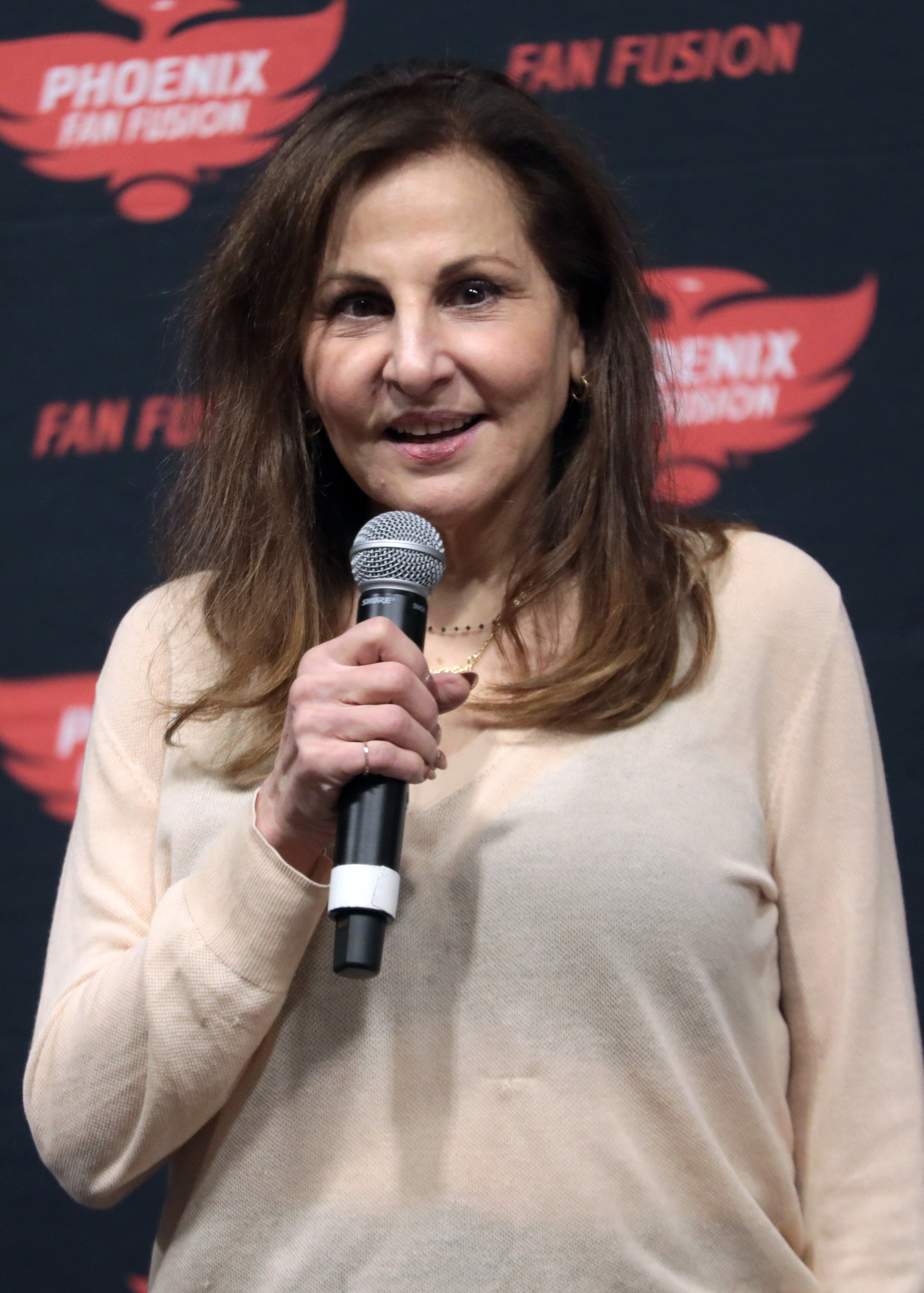
- Najimy in 2023
- Born: Kathy Ann Najimy; February 6, 1957 (age 69); San Diego, California, U.S.
- Occupations: Actress; activist
- Years active: 1981–present
- Spouse: Dan Finnerty (m. 1998)
- Children: Samia
- Website: www.kathynajimy.com

Kathy Ann Najimy (/nəˈdʒɪmi/ nə-JIM-ee; born February 6, 1957) is an American actress. She was first nationally known for her feminist play The Kathy and Mo Show, which she wrote and performed with Mo Gaffney. Najimy has had starring and supporting roles in many films, including Soapdish (1991), Sister Act (1992) and its sequel (1993), Hocus Pocus (1993) and its sequel (2022), Hope Floats (1998), The Wedding Planner (2001), Rat Race (2001), WALL-E (2008), Step Up 3D (2010), The Guilt Trip (2012), Tyler Perry's A Madea Christmas (2013), A Christmas Melody (2015), Dumplin' (2018), Music (2021), and Single All the Way (2021). Her television roles include Olive Massery on the NBC sitcom Veronica's Closet (1997–2000) and voicing Peggy Hill on the animated series King of the Hill (1997–2010, 2025–present).

== Early life ==
Kathy Ann Najimy was born on February 6, 1957, in San Diego, California, to Lebanese-American parents Samia (née Massery; Arabic: سامية ماسري) and Fred Najimy (Arabic: فريد نجمي), a postal worker. Her mother immigrated from Lebanon to the United States in 1946. She was raised Maronite Catholic and attended Crawford High School. Her father died when she was 14. She graduated from San Diego State University in 1995.

== Career ==
Najimy and Mo Gaffney's feminist comedy play The Kathy and Mo Show premiered in 1981 and had three long term New York City runs and generated two HBO specials, Parallel Lives and The Dark Side.

Najimy's film career began in the early 1990s, with a number of offbeat minor roles in The Fisher King, Soapdish, This Is My Life, The Hard Way. Her first major role was as Sister Mary Patrick in the 1992 comedy Sister Act, a role she reprised in 1993 in Sister Act 2. She also starred in Hocus Pocus as Mary Sanderson, alongside Bette Midler and Sarah Jessica Parker, and the 1994 made-for-TV movie In Search of Dr. Seuss as Kathy Lane. In 1999, she played the Stepmother in CinderElmo, a primetime special for Sesame Street. In 2001, she co-starred in the hit comedy film Rat Race alongside John Cleese, Rowan Atkinson, Cuba Gooding, Jr., Whoopi Goldberg, Jon Lovitz and Seth Green. She has made four movies with Goldberg (Soapdish, Sister Act 1 and 2, and Rat Race). Najimy starred in Disney and Pixar's Academy Award winning film WALL-E and Tyler Perry's A Madea Christmas.

From film, Najimy expanded into television roles, including a dramatic recurring role on Chicago Hope. She was part of the cast of Veronica's Closet from 1997 to 2000. She played Wendy Keegan in HBO's Veep for four seasons. She appeared with Ellen DeGeneres in three episodes of her sitcom Ellen, playing a different character each time (including a non-speaking cameo in the iconic "Puppy Episode"), and in the TV movie If These Walls Could Talk 2. Najimy was a series regular season 4 of Unforgettable, season 4 of The Big C, and season 3 of Numbers. She guest-starred on That's So Raven, Drop Dead Diva, Desperate Housewives, Ugly Betty, and Franklin & Bash. She starred in TNT's In Search of Dr. Seuss.

Najimy starred as Mae West in the Broadway hit Dirty Blonde. She appeared in V'Day's Vagina Monologues on Broadway and in Nassim Soleimanpour's plays White Rabbit Red Rabbit and Nassim. She is the co-creator and director of the musical revue Back to Bacharach and David, which ran in New York City in 1992 and 1993, and which she directed again in Los Angeles in April 2009.

Najimy starred as Peggy Hill in Fox's King of the Hill from 1997 to 2010. Her voice is featured in the animated films Brother Bear 2, The Jungle Book: Mowgli’s Story, Cats Don't Dance, and Tinkerbell. She has also lent her voice to hundreds of animated television shows and movies, including BoJack Horseman, Rapunzel's Tangled Adventure, American Dad!, Hercules, Pepper Ann, and played a role in the Nightmare Ned video game. In 2003, Najimy provided the voice of Margalo in Stuart Little: The Animated Series, taking over from Melanie Griffith, and in 2000 took over from Madeline Kahn as Mrs. Shapiro in Little Bill. She stars in Disney Junior's reboot of The Rocketeer and Amy Poehler's Duncanville.

In late July 2015, Najimy appeared in Disney's Descendants as the Evil Queen. Later that year, she took part in the successful Christmas TV movie A Christmas Melody starring Mariah Carey, Brennan Elliott, Lacey Chabert and Fina Strazza. It debuted on the Hallmark Channel on December 19, 2015. The film was viewed by 3.95 million people upon its debut.

She appeared in Netflix's 2018 film Dumplin' alongside Jennifer Aniston. Dumplin' was released on December 7, 2018, on the platform.

In 2021, she appeared in musical drama film Music, directed by singer-songwriter Sia. In the United States, it was released in select IMAX theatres for one night on February 10, 2021, and was followed by a premium video on demand release across the country on February 12. The same year, she starred in the Netflix Christmas romantic comedy Single All the Way alongside Michael Urie, Philemon Chambers and Jennifer Coolidge.

In 2022, Najimy reprised her role as Mary Sanderson in Hocus Pocus 2 for Disney+.

=== Other work ===
Najimy is an activist and frequently travels the country to speak on issues of equal rights, safety, and self esteem for women and girls, LGBTQ rights, AIDS awareness, domestic violence, body image, and civil rights. She has spoken at the Human Rights Campaign, Planned Parenthood, and PFLAG. She was a surrogate speaker for Hillary Clinton's 2016 presidential campaign. In 2004, Najimy was Ms. Magazine's Woman of the Year and a speaker at the March for Women's Lives. She is an active member of Time's Up.

Najimy has also worked with PETA on a number of animal welfare issues and posed with Todd Oldham for the "I'd Rather Go Naked Than Wear Fur" campaign. PETA gave her their Humanitarian of the Year award in 2000 and their Compassionate Action Award in 2014.

Najimy is a strong advocate for women's health and reproductive rights. She contributed to the groundbreaking book, The Choices We Made, which includes testimonials from women who believe in abortion rights. Najimy is vocal about issues regarding body image among women. In August 2006 she voiced her opinions over a remark made by Heidi Klum on the television series Project Runway after Klum said one model's outfit made her look plus-sized, which Najimy called "dangerous" and "irresponsible".

Najimy created and produced the off-Broadway play Gloria: A Life, about the life of activist Gloria Steinem. Starting in 2012, Najimy has been creating, directing, and co-writing personal monologues with actresses including Olivia Wilde, Amy Schumer, Zosia Mamet, Debra Messing, Rosie Perez, and Gabourey Sidibe. The pieces have been performed at Glamour Magazine's live evening of personal monologues titled "These Girls" and at the 2017 and 2018 MAKERS conference. Najimy is currently working on a documentary about the 53% of white women who voted for Donald Trump in 2016. She has performed her solo show, Lift Up Your Skirt, at many venues including the Adelaide Cabaret Festival, ICONS at Fire Island, and Feinstein's at The Nikko in San Francisco. She is also currently producing a television series about the women's movement.

Najimy uses her celebrity status to donate money to charities by appearing on game shows. She appeared as a contestant on a celebrity version of The Weakest Link where she won $50,000 for The Feminist Majority Foundation's Campaign to Stop Gender Apartheid in Afghanistan. She won the season 6 tournament of Celebrity Poker Showdown, donating the $100,000 to V-Day, an organization that helps stop violence against women and girls. She was also crowned Grand Champion on CBS's Gameshow Marathon in 2006, donating the $100,000 winnings to Girls Best Friend, a charity that helps empower girls. In 2013, Najimy was a contestant on Rachael vs. Guy: Celebrity Cook-Off on Team Rachael where she was playing for PETA, cooking only vegetarian food. She was eliminated on the Feb 3 episode, reaching third place.

Before she became a known actress, in 1981, Najimy was a contestant on Family Feud, which was used as the finale in Gameshow Marathon. Najimy and her family were winners on both shows. Najimy also appeared on the $25,000 Pyramid as a civilian contestant, on the episode dated July 31, 1985. She claimed, on the Pyramid show, that she also had been on American Bandstand. She returned to the "Pyramid" (The $100,000 Pyramid) on the June 26, 2016, episode as a celebrity guest opposite Rosie O'Donnell. She appeared once again in Season 2, Episode 7 on July 23, 2017, to play against Alexandra Wentworth, helping her contestant partner win the $150,000 grand prize.

== Personal life ==
In August 1998, Najimy married actor and singer Dan Finnerty of The Dan Band. Gloria Steinem officiated the ceremony. Najimy and Finnerty have one daughter, musician Samia.

== Filmography ==
=== Film ===
Year	Title	Role	Notes
1991	The Hard Way	Lang's "Girl Friday"	
1991	Soapdish	Tawny Miller	
1991	The Fisher King	Crazed Video Customer	
1992	Topsy and Bunker: The Cat Killers	Marge	
1992	This Is My Life	Angela	Credited as Kathy Ann Najimy
1992	Sister Act	Sister Mary Patrick	American Comedy Award for Funniest Supporting Actress in a Motion Picture; Nominated – MTV Movie + TV Award for Best Breakthrough Performance
1993	Hocus Pocus	Mary Sanderson	Nominated – Saturn Award for Best Supporting Actress
1993	Sister Act 2: Back in the Habit	Sister Mary Patrick	Nominated – American Comedy Award for Funniest Supporting Actress in a Motion Picture
1994	It's Pat	Tippy	
1994	Extraterrorestrial Alien Encounter	Dr. Jane Femus	Short
1995	Jeffrey	Acolyte	
1997	Cats Don't Dance	Tillie Hippo	Voice role
1997	Nevada	Ruth	
1998	Hope Floats	Toni Post	
1998	Zack and Reba	Ivy Simpson	
1998	Bride of Chucky	Motel Maid	
1998	The Jungle Book: Mowgli's Story	Chil	Voice role; Direct-to-video
2000	Attention Shoppers	Penelope	
2001	The Wedding Planner	Geri	
2001	Rat Race	Beverly 'Bev' Pear	
2005	Bam Bam and Celeste	Legba	
2006	Say Uncle	Maggie Butler	Associate producer
2006	Brother Bear 2	Aunt Taqqiq	Voice role; Direct-to-video
2008	WALL-E	Mary	Voice role
2008	Tinker Bell	The Minister of Summer	Voice role
2010	Step Up 3D	Mrs. Alexander	
2012	BearCity 2: The Proposal	Rose	
2012	Secret of the Wings	The Minster of Summer	Voice
2012	Stars in Shorts	Sid's Mother	
2012	The Guilt Trip	Gayle	
2013	A Madea Christmas	Kim Williams	
2016	No Letting Go	Dr. Nancy Harris	
2017	A Change of Heart	Ruthie	
2017	Dating My Mother	Lisa	
2017	Between the Shades	Herself	Documentary
2018	Dumplin'	Ms. Mitchellchuk	
2021	Music	Evelyn's Mom	
2021	Single All the Way	Carole	Direct-to-streaming
2022	Hocus Pocus 2	Mary Sanderson	Direct-to-streaming
2026	Hoppers	Dr. Sam	Voice role
2026	Hexed †	TBA	Voice role

=== Television ===
Year	Title	Role	Notes
1985	The $25,000 Pyramid	Herself (contestant)	Celebrity Guests: Constance McCashin & LeVar Burton
1985	Walls of Glass		
1991	The Kathy & Mo Show: Parallel Lives	Herself	Television special; also writer CableACE Award for Performance in a Comedy Special (shared with Mo Gaffney) (1993); Nominated – CableACE Award for Writing an Entertainment Special (shared with Mo Gaffney) (1993)
1994	In Search of Dr. Seuss	Kathy Lane	Television movie
1994	Ellen	Theresa / Lorna Irons / Woman in Gay Bar	3 episodes: "So Funny" (Season 2) / "Go Girlz" (Season 3) / "The Puppy Episode, Part 2" (Season 4)
1994	She TV	—N/a	Also writer (1 episode)
1995	The Kathy & Mo Show: The Dark Side	Herself	Television special; also writer CableACE Award for Comedy Special (shared with Mo Gaffney, Paula Mazur & Dean Parisot) (1995); CableACE Award for Performance in a Comedy Special (shared with Mo Gaffney) (1995)
1996	Adventures from the Book of Virtues	The Old Woman (voice)	Episode: "Self-Discipline"
1996	Chicago Hope	Dr. Barbara "Bix" Konstadt	Recurring role; 3 episodes Nominated – Viewers for Quality Television Award for Best Recurring Player (1996)
1997	Early Edition	Psychic	Episode: "Psychic"
1997	Shantay	Toyota Carter	Short
1997, 1999	Hey Arnold!	Madame Blanche (voice)	2 episodes
1997–2000	Veronica's Closet	Olive Massery	67 episodes OFTA Television Award for Best Supporting Actress in a Series (1998); OFTA Television Award for Best Supporting Actress in a Comedy Series (1998)
1997–2010, 2025–present	King of the Hill	Peggy Hill (voice)	Main role Annie Award for Outstanding Individual Achievement for Voice Acting by a Female Performer in an Animated Television Production (2001); OFTA Television Award for Best Voice-Over Performance (2001); Nominated – Annie Award for Outstanding Individual Achievement for Voice Acting by a Female Performer in an Animated Television Production (1998); Nominated – OFTA Television Award for Best Voice-Over Performance (1998, 2004, 2005)
1998–1999	Hercules	Thespis the Muse (voice)	2 episodes
1998–2000	Pepper Ann	Coach Doogan / Margot LaSandre / Additional voices	5 episodes
1999	The Wild Thornberrys	Ostrich #1 / Sand Grouse (voices)	Episode: "Have Yourself a Thornberry Little Christmas"
1999	The Sissy Duckling	Mother Duck #1 (voice)	Television film
1999	CinderElmo	Stepmother	Television movie
2000	If These Walls Could Talk 2	Doctor	Television movie; segment: "2000"
2000	Leaving Peoria	Dr. Beatrice Albright	Short
2000–2003	Little Bill	Mrs. Judith Shapiro (voice)	3 episodes; succeeded Madeline Kahn, the original voice of Mrs. Shapiro, shortly after her death in 1999.
2001–2003	Oswald	Bingette Bunny (voice)	4 episodes
2001	The Legend of Tarzan	Dania (voice)	Episode: "Tarzan and the Rift"
2002	The Scream Team	Mariah	Television movie
2003	The Mummy	Calliope / Aglaophone #2 (voices)	Episode: "The Enemy of My Enemy"
2003	Stuart Little	Margalo (voice)	Episode: "The Meatloaf Bandit"
2003	Ozzy & Drix	Loretta Epstein (voice)	Episode: "The Dream Factory"
2003	The Making of King of the Hill	Herself	Television documentary
2004	Higglytown Heroes	Photographer Hero (voice)	Episode: "The Legend of Higgsquatch"
2004	Rocket Power	Patsy (voice)	Episode: "Sammy's Fortune"
2005	Wayside: The Movie	Mrs. Jewls (voice)	Television movie
2005	Getting Played	Dr. Heidi Z. Klemmer	Television movie
2005	Balto III: Wings of Change	Dipsy (voice)	Video
2006	Scooby-Doo! Pirates Ahoy!	Sunny St. Cloud (voice)	Video
2006	Tom and Jerry: Shiver Me Whiskers	Blue Parrot Betty (voice)	Video
2006	Rugrats	Goosey (voice)	Direct-to-DVD episode: "Tales from the Crib: Three Jacks and a Beanstalk"
2006	That's So Raven	Lora Stelladora	Episode: "The Dress Is Always Greener"
2006–2007	Numb3rs	Dr. Mildred Finch	9 episodes
2007	The Suite Life of Zack & Cody	principal Mrs. Militich	Episode: "First Day of High School"
2008	Tinker Bell	Minister of Summer (voice)	Video
2009	Drop Dead Diva	Claire Porter	Episode: "The Magic Bullet"
2009	Desperate Housewives	Detective Denise Lapera	Episode: "Careful the Things You Say"
2010	Ugly Betty	Dr. Jayne Frankel	Episode: "Million Dollar Smile"
2010	RuPaul's Drag Race	Herself (Guest Judge)	Episode: "Country Queens"
2011	Mr. Sunshine	Myrna	Episode: "Employee of the Year"
2011	Five	Rocky	Television movie
2011	Deck the Halls	Alvirah Meehan	
2011–2012	Make It or Break It	Sheila / Sheila Baboyon / Kelly's Mom	5 episodes
2012	Men at Work	Sasha Ryan	Episode: "Heterotextual Male"
2012	How to Fall in Love	Kim	Television movie
2013	Rachael vs. Guy: Celebrity Cook-Off	Herself	Season 2 participant (Team Rachael)
2013	The Big C	Therapist	4 episodes
2013	Twisted	Mrs. Fisk	Episode: "Pilot"
2014–2015	Inside Amy Schumer	Herself	2 episodes
2014–2019	Veep	Wendy Keegan	10 episodes
2015–2021	Younger	Denise Heller	8 episodes
2015–2016	Unforgettable	Sandra Russo	Series regular, 10 episodes
2015	A Christmas Melody	Sarah	Hallmark television movie
2015	Descendants	The Evil Queen Grimhilde	Television movie
2015	Difficult People	Carol Donato	Episode: "The Children's Menu"
2016	Harvey Beaks	Hanzi / Angry Bride	4 episodes
2016	The Jamz	Dan	4 episodes Also consulting producer
2016–2017	Graves	Sylvia Miller	4 episodes
2016–2018	The $100,000 Pyramid	Herself (celebrity guest)	5 episodes
2017	Elementary	Rayna Carno	Episode: "Rekt in Real Life"
2017	BoJack Horseman	Marcy Jerominek (voice)	Episode: "Commence Fracking"
2017	The President Show	Ivana Trump	Episode: "I Came Up with Christmas: A President Show Christmas"
2018	Rapunzel's Tangled Adventure	Mother Maud (voice)	Episode: "Freebird"
2018	Crazy Ex-Girlfriend	Herself	Episode: "I Am Ashamed"
2019	The Good Fight	Judge Gayle Eno	Episode: "The One Where Diane and Liz Topple Democracy"
2019	Good Witch	Willow	Episode: "The Road Trip"
2019	American Dad!	Cheryl (voice)	Episode: "Pride Before the Fail"
2019	The Rocketeer	Sareena Second (voice)	Main role
2020–2022	Duncanville	Mayor, Additional voices	Recurring role
2020	Rise of the Teenage Mutant Ninja Turtles	Mayor Mira (voice)	Episode: "Raph's Ride-Along/Donnie vs. Witch Town"
2020	Robot Chicken	Mary Sanderson (voice)	Episode: "Ghandi Mulholland in: Plastic Doesn't Get Cancer"
2020	Elena of Avalor	Peaches (voice)	Episode: "Heart of The Jaguar"
2021	The Morning Show	Sylvia Portman	Episode: "My Least Favorite Year"
2022	Bee and PuppyCat: Lazy in Space	TempBot, Fighter (voice)	Episode: "Who Would Want This?"
2023	Blaze and the Monster Machines	The Green Queen (Voice)	Episode: "Super Wheels vs. The Green Queen"

=== Video games ===
Year	Title	Role	Notes
2000	King of the Hill	Peggy Hill	
2022	Warped Kart Racers	Peggy Hill	Archival recording

=== Music videos ===
Year	Title	Artist	Ref(s)
2021	"Gummy Bear"	Ginger Minj	

== Theater ==
Year	Title	Role	Notes
1986	The Further Adventures of Kathy and Mo	Performer	Off-Broadway; Also author
1989	The Kathy & Mo Show: Parallel Lives	Performer	Off-Broadway; Also playwright
2000	Dirty Blonde	Various characters	Broadway
2004	Afterbirth: Kathy & Mo's Greatest Hits	Performer	Off-Broadway; Also playwright
2016	White Rabbit Red Rabbit	Performer	Off-Broadway
2018	Nassim	Performer	Off-Broadway
2024	Gutenberg! The Musical!	Producer	Broadway

== See also ==
- List of Maronites
