= Vinessa Shaw =

American actress (born 1976)

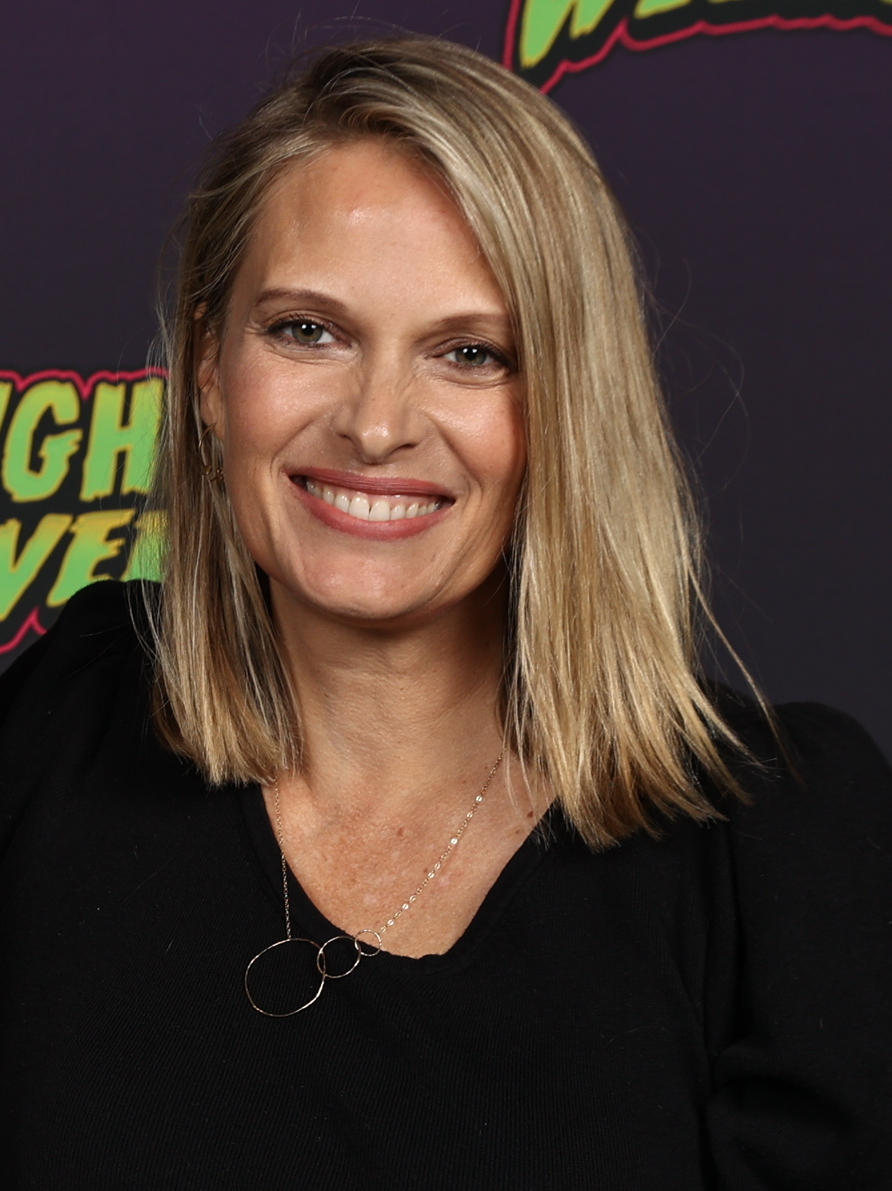
- Shaw at Nightmare Weekend Richmond in 2023
- Born: Vinessa Elizabeth Shaw; July 19, 1976 (age 50); Los Angeles, California, U.S.
- Occupations: Actress; model
- Years active: 1981–present
- Spouse: Kristopher Gifford (m. 2007)
- Children: 1
- Mother: Susan Damante
- Relatives: Natalie Shaw (sister)

Vinessa Elizabeth Shaw (born July 19, 1976) is an American film actress and model. She began her career as a child actress, making her feature film debut in the slasher film Home Sweet Home (1981). She had her breakout role in Disney's Halloween comedy-fantasy film Hocus Pocus (1993). Shaw also appeared in Ladybugs (1992) and L.A. Without a Map (1998).

While attending Barnard College, Shaw was cast in a supporting role in Stanley Kubrick's Eyes Wide Shut (1999), after which she decided to continue acting into her adulthood. Subsequent roles include in Kathryn Bigelow's period drama The Weight of Water (2000); the comedy 40 Days and 40 Nights (2002), the 2006 remake of Wes Craven's horror film The Hills Have Eyes, the western 3:10 to Yuma (2007), and the romantic drama Two Lovers (2008).

In 2014, Shaw was a supporting cast member in the Showtime drama Ray Donovan. During this period, she also appeared in several feature films, including Steven Soderbergh's psychological thriller Side Effects (2013), and the crime drama Cold in July (2014). Shaw later starred as Dr. Jane Mathis in the 2017 horror thriller Clinical. In 2021, Shaw starred in the horror film We Need to Do Something, as well as the biographical sports drama 12 Mighty Orphans.

== Life and career ==
=== 1976–1997: Early life and career ===
Vinessa Elizabeth Shaw was born in Los Angeles, California, to Larry Shaw and actress Susan Damante. Shaw's father, a native of Los Angeles, is a psychologist and former adjunct professor of psychology at Antioch University. Her name, Vinessa, spelled with an "i" rather than the common "a", was a variation of her grandfather's name, Vincent. She is of mixed Russian-Jewish, Italian, Irish, German, English, Mexican, Swedish, and Dutch ancestry. Her family's original surname was "Schwartz", owing to her father's partial Jewish heritage. Shaw was raised in her parents' Nichiren Buddhist faith.

Shaw made her first formal performance in a UCLA acting camp short at age 10, and subsequently toured with children's folk singer Peter Alsop at age 11. She also signed on with the Elite Models agency in 1989 at the age of 13 before beginning her acting career.

Shaw had made her feature film debut in the independent 1981 slasher film Home Sweet Home, which dealt with a serial killer targeting a family at Thanksgiving. She then landed parts in a handful of television roles, including the 1991 NBC television film Long Road Home, which marked her television debut. The following year, she had a supporting role in the family sports comedy Ladybugs, opposite Jonathan Brandis. Though not a box-office success, Ladybugs gained an audience through regular subsequent television broadcast, and helped establish a fan following for Shaw.

Shaw played a considerably larger role in the Disney Halloween-themed family film Hocus Pocus (1993) alongside Bette Midler, Sarah Jessica Parker, Kathy Najimy, Omri Katz, and Thora Birch. In the film, Shaw portrays a local teenager in a Massachusetts town that is overtaken by a trio of witches on Halloween night. Though a box-office bomb at the time of its release, the film went on to garner a significant fanbase in the ensuing years.

=== 1998–2005: Career expansion ===
In 1998, Shaw appeared in a lead role as an aspiring young actress in the comedy-drama film L.A. Without a Map, opposite David Tennant, Julie Delpy, and Vincent Gallo. The same year, Shaw enrolled at Barnard College in New York City, but ultimately dropped out to continue pursuing an acting career. Shaw was attending the college when she was approached by Stanley Kubrick for her role in Eyes Wide Shut (1999), playing a prostitute who is encountered by Tom Cruise's character and who discovers she has HIV. In a 2008 interview, Shaw stated that Kubrick was "very influential" to her and that he "was the first person who encouraged her to continue acting". At the time of being cast, she was in college and considering alternate career options. Following her role in Eyes Wide Shut, Shaw played parts in a handful of films including Kathryn Bigelow's mystery-drama The Weight of Water (2000) with Sarah Polley and Sean Penn, in which Shaw portrayed a Norwegian immigrant who is the victim of an axe murder; the film and its source novel are both partly based on a real double-murder that occurred on Smuttynose Island in 1873.

Shaw next starred opposite Chris Kattan in the slapstick mafia comedy Corky Romano (2001), portraying an FBI agent, followed by the romantic comedy 40 Days and 40 Nights (2002), in which she played the feisty ex-girlfriend of a young man (Josh Hartnett) who attempts to give up sex for lent. She also had a minor supporting role in Woody Allen's Melinda and Melinda (2004).

=== 2006–present: Further film and television roles ===
More low budget and independent films consumed Shaw's time until 2006, where she returned to the big screen in Alexandre Aja's remake of Wes Craven's exploitation-horror film The Hills Have Eyes, playing a young mother on a camping trip with her family who is attacked by bloodthirsty mutants in the New Mexico desert. Director Aja had wanted to cast her in the film after seeing her performance in Eyes Wide Shut. Asked why she wanted to act in a horror film, Shaw responded "Well, I guess I could be good in it since I'm so frightened of those kinds of concepts. But this one in particular really attracted me because of the filmmakers. I really thought that they had a great stance on it. Like it's very different, very heartfelt, and heartbreaking because of the characters involved. So that's kind of what made the difference. It was more of an actor's piece, if you can believe that, in a horror movie."

Shaw had a supporting role as a barmaid in James Mangold's remake of the classic Western film 3:10 to Yuma (2007), co-starring Russell Crowe and Christian Bale. Next, she appeared in two independent films: The drama Garden Party, about a group of troubled Los Angeles teenagers, and the horror film Stag Night, portraying a stripper who becomes trapped with several others in an abandoned New York City Subway platform after witnessing a murder.

She subsequently had a lead role in the romantic drama Two Lovers (2008) opposite Joaquin Phoenix and Gwyneth Paltrow. Two Lovers premiered at the Cannes Film Festival in 2008 and was released theatrically in February 2009.

In 2013, she had a supporting role opposite Jude Law in Steven Soderbergh's psychological thriller Side Effects. She next appeared in the Eddie Dodson biopic Electric Slide (2014), followed by the crime thriller Cold in July (also 2014), a film adaptation of the 1989 novel of the same name, opposite Michael C. Hall, Sam Shepard, and Don Johnson. Shaw also had a multi-episode arc on the Showtime drama series Ray Donovan in its second season (2014).

Shaw starred as a psychiatrist in the 2017 horror film Clinical, which was distributed via Netflix. She follow this with a lead in another Netflix-released horror film, Family Blood (2018) which was produced by Blumhouse Productions.

Shaw had a supporting role in the depression-era sports drama 12 Mighty Orphans (2021), based on American football coach Rusty Russell (portrayed by Luke Wilson). The same year, she starred in the independent psychological horror film We Need to Do Something, which was filmed during the COVID-19 pandemic and co-starred Sierra McCormick, Pat Healy, and Ozzy Osbourne.

In 2023, Shaw returned to television, guest-starring in seven episodes of the Apple TV+ sports drama series Swagger. In November 2024, she guest-starred on the series Cruel Intentions, followed by a guest appearance as a medical examiner on the series Yellowstone.

== Personal life ==
Shaw became a member of the Soka Gakkai International, a Nichiren Buddhist organization, during her first year attending college in 1996: "I was lonely and depressed, and I had so many questions about life. I called my dad every night crying, saying that I wanted to go home." As a core practice of Nichiren Buddhism, Shaw chants daimoku daily, and is also a facilitator of the SGI-USA lay Buddhist Association for Peace, Culture, and Education.

Shaw married Kristopher Gifford on November 30, 2007. Shaw gave birth to their first child, a son, in February 2018. The couple separated on October 25, 2023, and Gifford filed for divorce in May 2025.

== Filmography ==
=== Film ===
Year	Title	Role	Notes	Ref.
1981	Home Sweet Home	Angel Bradley	Alternative title: Slasher in the House	
1992	Ladybugs	Kimberly Mullen		
1993	Hocus Pocus	Allison Watts		
1996	Coyote Summer	Callie Carpenter		
1998	L.A. Without a Map	Barbara		
1999	Eyes Wide Shut	Domino		
1999	Wayward Son	Cordelia		
2000	The Weight of Water	Anethe Christenson		
2001	Corky Romano	Agent Kate Russo		
2002	40 Days and 40 Nights	Nicole		
2004	Melinda and Melinda	Stacey		
2004	Bereft	Molly		
2006	The Hills Have Eyes	Lynn Carter		
2007	3:10 to Yuma	Emma Nelson		
2007	Badland	Nora Rice		
2008	Two Lovers	Sandra Cohen		
2008	Garden Party	St. Claire		
2008	Stag Night	Brita		
2010	Leave	Amy		
2011	Puncture	Vicky		
2012	Big Miracle	Kelly Meyers		
2012	Come Out and Play	Beth		
2013	Side Effects	Dierdre Banks		
2013	Siren	Leigh		
2013	Dark Around the Stars	Terry		
2013	Electric Slide	Mimi		
2014	Cold in July	Ann Dane		
2014	After the Fall	Susan Scanlon		
2015	Bereave	Penelope		
2017	Clinical	Dr. Jane Mathis		
2018	Family Blood	Ellie		
2021	The Blazing World	Alice Winter		
2021	12 Mighty Orphans	Juanita Russell		
2021	We Need to Do Something	Diane		
2025	The Wilderness	Audrey		

=== Television ===
Year	Title	Role	Notes
1991	Long Road Home	Clara Tarpin	Television film
1992	The Torkelsons	Meredith Reed	Episode: "Sweat Not by the Moon"
1992	Great Scott!	Carolyn Cole	
1993	Fallen Angels	Jeannie Streeter	Episode: "The Quiet Room"
1993	Country Estates	Heather Calhoun	Pilot
1994	McKenna	Cassidy McKenna	Episode: Pilot (only)
1994	Murder, She Wrote	Gloria Bryce	Episode: "Murder by Twos"
1995	New York Undercover	Teen Covergirl	Episode: "Young, Beautiful and Dead"
2000	The '70s	Eileen Wells	Miniseries
2004	Bereft	Molly	Television film
2005	Fathers and Sons	Nell	Pilot
2005	World of Trouble	Unknown	Pilot
2010	House	Dr. Kelly Benedict	Episode: "Massage Therapy"
2012	CSI: NY	Jennifer Walsh	Episode: "Clean Sweep"
2014	Those Who Kill	Angela Early	3 episodes
2014	Ray Donovan	Kate McPherson	10 episodes
2023	Swagger	Diane	7 episodes
2024	Cruel Intentions	Dr. Deidre Dawson	Episode: "Delta"
2024	Yellowstone	Dr. Everly	Episode: "Three Fifty-Three"

== Accolades ==
Award	Year	Category	Work	Result
Screen Actors Guild Awards	2008	Outstanding Performance by a Cast in a Motion Picture	3:10 to Yuma	Nominated
Young Artist Award	1993	Best Young Actress Recurring in a Television Series	Great Scott!	Nominated
Young Artist Award	1993	Outstanding Young Ensemble Cast in a Motion Picture	Ladybugs	Nominated
Young Artist Award	1993	Best Young Actress Co-starring in a Motion Picture	Ladybugs	Nominated
Young Artist Award	1994	Best Youth Actress Leading Role in a Motion Picture Comedy	Hocus Pocus	Nominated
Young Artist Award	1995	Best Performance by a Youth Actress in a Drama Series	McKenna	Nominated
Young Artist Award	1995	Best Performance By a Youth Actress as a Guest Star	Murder, She Wrote	Nominated
