= Clinical (film) =

- Film poster
- Directed by: Alistair Legrand
- Written by: Luke Harvis; Alistair Legrand
- Produced by: Ross M. Dinerstein
- Starring: Vinessa Shaw; Kevin Rahm; India Eisley; Aaron Stanford; Nestor Serrano; Sydney Tamiia Poitier; Wilmer Calderon; William Atherton; Dion Basco
- Cinematography: John Frost
- Edited by: Blair Miller; Yvonne Valdez
- Music by: Ian Hultquist
- Production company: Campfire
- Distributed by: Netflix
- Release date: January 13, 2017
- Running time: 104 minutes
- Country: United States
- Language: English

Clinical is a 2017 American horror thriller film directed by Alistair Legrand and written by Luke Harvis and Alistair Legrand. The film stars Vinessa Shaw, Kevin Rahm, India Eisley, Aaron Stanford, Nestor Serrano, Sydney Tamiia Poitier, and Wilmer Calderon. The film was released on Netflix on January 13, 2017.

== Plot ==
Dr. Jane Mathis (Vinessa Shaw) is a psychiatrist and an expert at confrontational therapy. Two years prior, she had a patient, Nora Green, who attacked her and attempted suicide in her office. As a result, Dr. Mathis developed PTSD and sleep paralysis, which led her to seek help from Dr. Terry Drummond. She has also begun to date a police officer named Miles Richardson. Against Dr. Terry's advice, she continues her practice as a psychiatrist, albeit not prescribing medication. She reluctantly agrees to see a new patient, Alex, whose face was disfigured from a car accident. One night, he is seen sleepwalking inside her house, prompting Jane to call the police. Alex persuades her to continue their sessions, appealing to her expertise and understanding.

In flashbacks, it is revealed that Nora began seeing Jane because she was being abused by her father. After confronting him, Nora attacked Jane, who received severe stab wounds to her arms. In present-day, Jane visits the institution where Nora was hospitalized and is informed that Nora was discharged due to lack of money after her father's death. She sees footage of Nora's sessions at the institution, which reveals Nora's violent rage anytime she speaks about her father. Jane installs security cameras around her home, and reveals to Alex her previous failure with Nora, chalking it up to relying too heavily on medication. Alex recalls more of his accident; after helping pull a couple from their totaled car, he noticed his daughter wandered into the path of an oncoming truck. Both were struck, but only his daughter was killed.

Strange things continue to occur in Jane's house, such as dirty footprints and bloody photographs. Miles notices that someone has tampered with the security system, as whole hours of footage are missing. Jane refuses to press charges against Nora for fear that she will be sent back to the institution and drugged. She later steals prescriptions from Dr. Terry, having run out of her own medication. Alex shows up at her house even though Jane has canceled all her patients and she explains that there needs to be boundaries between doctor and patient. In another bout of sleep paralysis, Jane relives the horror of Nora's attack two years ago. When she awakes disoriented, Nora appears and attacks Jane. In self-defense, Jane stabs Nora in the head, killing her.

Jane is institutionalised, enduring confusion and heavy sedation. The resident psychiatrist shows her security footage from her home, which reveals that during a drug-induced hysteria, she attacked and killed Miles. She is to be held in the institution until her trial. Days pass and one night, Jane sees Nora hanging from the tree outside. Her friend Clara visits but when she leaves, she is tasered by Alex. The psychiatrist condescendingly explains to Jane that Nora had said she killed her father but her father was alive and was paying her hospital bills. He says Nora killed herself by hanging after she left the hospital and accuses Jane of driving Nora to insanity. Jane realizes Nora's father is Alex and breaks out of the institution. In the same way as Clara, she is tasered.

She wakes up in her home and sees Clara dead. Alex enters and explains that he wanted to punish her for trying to help Nora, his daughter. Nora had attacked him in self-defense, which led to his disfigured face, and he staged the car accident to explain his injuries and make it onto the donor list for a skin graft. He also stopped paying Nora's bills to get her out and made her break into Jane's house and psychologically torment her. On the night of the murder, Alex had broken in and drugged Jane, which led her to accidentally kill Miles.

Jane finds Dr. Terry in a pool of blood. While attempting to escape through the window, she is pulled back by Alex. She grabs at his face and pulls off the grafted skin as she falls. She returns to the house and sees Alex sitting on the couch, faceless and presumably dead.

== Cast ==
- Vinessa Shaw as Dr. Jane Mathis
- Kevin Rahm as Alex
- India Eisley as Nora Green
- Aaron Stanford as Miles Richardson
- Nestor Serrano as Dr. Saul
- Sydney Tamiia Poitier as Clara
- Wilmer Calderon as Greg
- William Atherton as Terry Drummond
- Dion Basco as Jeremy Platt
- Adrian Flowers as Charlie

== Release ==
The film was released on Netflix on January 13, 2017.
