= Home Sweet Home (1981 film) =

1981 American slasher film directed by Nettie Peña

- Original poster
- Directed by: Nettie Peña
- Screenplay by: Thomas Bush
- Story by: Thomas Bush
- Produced by: Don Edmonds
- Starring: Jake Steinfeld; Vinessa Shaw; Peter De Paula
- Cinematography: Don Stern
- Edited by: Nettie Peña
- Music by: Richard Tufo
- Production companies: Movies Anonymous Partnership; Intercontinental Releasing Corporation
- Distributed by: Intercontinental Releasing Corporation
- Release date: 1981 (United States)
- Running time: 83 minutes
- Country: United States
- Language: English

Home Sweet Home (also known as Slasher in the House) is a 1981 American slasher film directed by Nettie Peña, and written by Thomas Bush. It stars Jake Steinfeld, Peter De Paula, and Vinessa Shaw in her film debut, and the plot focuses on a PCP-addicted killer who terrorizes a family in their remote home on Thanksgiving. Along with Blood Rage and the faux Thanksgiving trailer from Grindhouse which would later be fully adapted as Thanksgiving, it is one of the few slasher films centered on the Thanksgiving holiday, and one of the few to be directed by a woman.

While not prosecuted for obscenity, the film was seized and confiscated in the UK under Section 3 of the Obscene Publications Act 1959 during the video nasty panic.

== Plot ==
A parked motorist is strangled by escaped mental patient Jay Jones, a PCP addict who was institutionalized after bludgeoning his parents. Jay carjacks his victim, and runs down an old woman while driving through Los Angeles.

On the outskirts of the city, nine people have gathered to celebrate Thanksgiving at the ranch of Harold Bradley. Among the revelers are Harold's girlfriend Linda; his tenant Scott and his girlfriend Jennifer; Linda's friend Gail; Harold's business associate Wayne and his girlfriend Maria; Harold's son "Mistake," a Kiss Army soldier; and Harold's young daughter Angel. As there is no wine in the house, Linda and Gail borrow Scott's car to go and get some, while Jay cuts off the house's power. Harold turns on the emergency generator, leaves to get more gasoline for it, and happens upon Jay's abandoned station wagon. As Harold tries to take the battery out of the car, Jay body splashes on the hood down on him, crushing his skull.

Jay severs the telephone line, and when Wayne goes out to look for Harold, he is garroted by Jay, who was hiding in the backseat of his car. Linda and Gail, who had become lost, run out of gas, and as they try to find their way back to the ranch, they run into Jay. Jay slams Gail's head into a rock, and stabs Linda to death with a broken bottle. Afterward, Jay returns to the house, where the remaining guests and members of the Bradley family have sat down to a turkey dinner.

When Maria goes to the washroom, Jay stabs her, and proceeds to chase "Mistake" around the property, eventually catching and fatally shocking him with his own electric guitar and portable amplifier. Scott discovers Maria's body while collecting firewood, runs back to the ranch, and secures the building with Jennifer and Angel. Jay manages to break inside, and as he tries strangling Scott, Jennifer wounds him with a knife.

Jay recovers, slits Scott's throat, and pursues Jennifer, who faints while hiding in Scott's room. In the morning, Jennifer awakens, and is assaulted by Jay when she ventures outside. A pair of police officers, alerted to the situation by Angel, pull up, and blast Jay with a shotgun. As one officer places Jennifer in his car with Angel, the other checks on Jay, who suddenly opens his eyes.

== Cast ==
- Jake Steinfeld as Jay Jones
- Vinessa Shaw as Angel Bradley
- Peter De Paula as "Mistake" Bradley
- Don Edmonds as Harold Bradley
- Charles Hoyes as Wayne
- David Mielke as Scott
- Leia Naron as Gail
- Lisa Rodríguez as Maria
- Colette Trygg as Jennifer
- Sallee Young as Linda
- J. Kelly as Officer Jim
- R. Fouts as Officer Tom
- Victor Paddock as First Victim
- Rochelle Constanten as Old Woman
- Anne Cribbs as Witness

== Reception ==
Retro Slashers wrote, "The film has heart. Sure, it's a kind of mindless and confused heart, but the acting is decent and there's a real feeling that the filmmakers were shooting for something". A 1 1/2 out of a possible 5 was awarded by Hysteria Lives!, which opined that "Home Sweet Home is a truly terrible movie. It's bad to the very core; but if you are in just the right mood and you're an aficionado of cheese then you might get a few kicks out of this fetid stinker". Film Bizarro deemed the film an obnoxious mess that was filled with annoying and stupid characters, awful attempts at comedy, poorly done gore, and a complete lack of originality or successful horror. Critical Condition found that Home Sweet Home was "one cop-out after another" marred by poor lighting and an antagonist who "hams it up so badly, you half expect bacon to fly off the screen".

Film historian Adam Rockoff wrote of the film: "For being so irredeemably terrible, Home Sweet Home has a strangely compelling pedigree... I've heard that star Steinfeld has no sense of humor about involvement with the film, which makes watching this travesty almost worthwhile."

== Bibliography ==
- Goldweber, David E. (2012). Claws & Saucers: Science Fiction, Horror, and Fantasy Film: A Complete Guide: 1902-1982. Lulu Press. ISBN 978-1-10504-350-5.
- Rockoff, Adam (2015). The Horror of It All: One Moviegoer's Love Affair with Masked Maniacs, Frightened Virgins, and the Living Dead. Scribner. ISBN 978-1-47676-183-1.
