= Electric Slide (film) =

2014 biographical crime film directed by Tristan Patterson

- Theatrical release poster
- Directed by: Tristan Patterson
- Written by: Tristan Pattersan
- Based on: an article by Timothy Ford
- Produced by: Kirk D'Amico; Hans Ritter; Christine Vachon
- Starring: Jim Sturgess; Isabel Lucas; Chloë Sevigny; Patricia Arquette; Christopher Lambert
- Cinematography: Darran Tiernan
- Edited by: John Paul Horstmann
- Music by: Kevin Haskins
- Production companies: Di Bonaventura Pictures; Killer Films; Media House Capital; Myriad Pictures
- Distributed by: Paragon Releasing
- Release date: April 2014 (Tribeca Film Festival)
- Running time: 95 minutes
- Country: United States
- Language: English

Electric Slide is a 2014 American biographical crime film written and directed by Tristan Patterson. It stars Jim Sturgess as Los Angeles–based bank robber Eddie Dodson, who robbed 64 banks in 1983 before he was caught. It premiered at the 2014 Tribeca Film Festival and received a limited theatrical release in April 2015.

== Plot ==
Eddie Dodson borrows money from the bank to finance a stylish furniture shop that doubles as a nightclub. When he is unable to pay back the loans, he turns to loan shark Roy Fortune. After his upper-class girlfriend, Charlotte, dumps him, Dodson steals an expensive vase from his friend Tina and pawns it for a starting pistol. While at a nightclub, he meets Pauline. She insists he give her a ride, and they begin dating after bonding over their love of trendy Los Angeles punk music. Dodson confides in her that he plans to rob a bank.

The next morning, Dodson follows through on his plan. His stylish appearance and flirtatious behavior make an impression on the bank teller, and she does not set off the alarm until he leaves. The investigating police officers, Detectives Holiday and Mercury, have little to go on besides his expensive fashion sense. Although frustrated with his limited take, Dodson uses the money to slowly begin paying back Fortune. Impressed that Dodson has pulled off the robbery, Pauline eventually becomes his getaway driver. She suggests that he is not really stealing from people if he provides them with a service. Dodson targets female tellers, whom he compliments as he demands the money.

Dodson hits banks all over Beverly Hills and Hollywood, Los Angeles, funneling most of the money to pay off Fortune. However, during one of his robberies, the teller includes a dye pack, which explodes in his car. After another robbery, Tina recognizes him and engages him in conversation before he can leave the bank. When she invites him to a party, he leaves in her car, abandoning Pauline. The police discover Dodson's car in the bank's parking lot and issue a warrant for his arrest based on the dye splashed in it. However, the teller backs out of identifying him in a line-up. With no other evidence, the police release him. Pauline does not return home.

When Dodson begins spending the money to feed his lavish lifestyle, Fortune threatens to kill him. After Dodson pulls his starting pistol, an enraged Fortune forces him to commit another bank robbery under the eye of his thugs. The teller's supervisor is uncooperative and calls Dodson's bluff, but Dodson intimidates the teller into handing over the money. As Dodson runs from the bank, the supervisor chases him; Dodson eludes both the thugs and the supervisor. At his house, Pauline, who has finally returned, says she has already told the police everything, as she no longer loves him, though she quickly contradicts herself by saying the police do not know of her existence. The police surround the house, and Dodson first imagines suicide by cop before, in reality, being arrested by Det. Mercury, who recognizes the starting pistol as fake.

== Cast ==
- Jim Sturgess as Eddie Dodson
- Isabel Lucas as Pauline
- Patricia Arquette as Tina
- Christopher Lambert as Roy Fortune
- Chloë Sevigny as Charlotte
- Vinessa Shaw as Mimi
- John Doe as Detective Bill Holiday
- Will McCormack as Detective Fred Mercury
- Kate Micucci as Sue Fellucci
- Constance Wu as Mika Oh
- Megalyn Echikunwoke as Jean
- Rhys Coiro as Glen
- James Ransone as Jan Phillips
- Oz Perkins as Andy Segal
- Cortney Palm as Jan's Girl

Susie Castillo, Susan Park, Samantha Colburn, Joanna Spracklin, Kelsey Ford, and Amy Ferguson appear as bank tellers.

== Production ==
The script was based on an article in Gear magazine written by Timothy Ford. Ewan McGregor and Carey Mulligan were originally cast. Shooting took place in Los Angeles in 2012.

== Release ==
Electric Slide premiered at the 2014 Tribeca Film Festival. Foreign distribution of the film caused an arbitration case after Osiris Entertainment said that the production company, Myriad Pictures, secretly allowed the film to be distributed in territories known for rampant piracy. After the film was pirated and went viral, Osiris Entertainment demanded a discount. The dispute was resolved confidentially in August 2015. Paragon Pictures gave it a limited theatrical release in the U.S. in April 2015.

== Reception ==
Rotten Tomatoes, a review aggregator, reports that 14% of seven surveyed critics gave the film a positive review; the average rating is 3 out of 10. Metacritic rated it 37 out of 100 based on six reviews. Frank Scheck of The Hollywood Reporter called it a dull film that "never manages to achieve the dramatic tension or satiric social commentary to which it aspires". Though he complimented the film's attention to period detail, Ernest Hardy of The Village Voice wrote, "The film itself, despite being based on a larger-than-life true story, is limp and anemic." Wes Greene of Slant Magazine rated it 2 out of 4 stars and called the film style over substance. Rodrigo Perez of Indiewire rated it D− and wrote, "Tiresomely told, uninteresting, and turgid, Electric Slide is as insipid as it gets—a meaningless movie about almost nothing at all." Brian Orndorf of Bluray.com awarded the film 3/10 and wrote, "The only performer who registers with unpredictability is Lambert, making a rare screen appearance as a hot-headed kingpin surrounded by bikini-clad women. He’s a small offering of aggression in a flatlining film."
