= Legend of the Guardians: The Owls of Ga'Hoole =

2010 animated film by Zack Snyder

- Theatrical release poster
- Directed by: Zack Snyder
- Screenplay by: John Orloff; Emil Stern
- Based on: Guardians of Ga'Hoole by Kathryn Lasky
- Produced by: Zareh Nalbandian
- Starring: Helen Mirren; Geoffrey Rush; Jim Sturgess; Hugo Weaving
- Edited by: David Burrows
- Music by: David Hirschfelder
- Production companies: Warner Bros. Pictures; Village Roadshow Pictures; Animal Logic; GOG Productions
- Distributed by: Warner Bros. Pictures (United States); Roadshow Entertainment (Australia/New Zealand)
- Release dates: September 19, 2010 (Grauman's Chinese Theatre); September 24, 2010 (United States); September 30, 2010 (Australia)
- Running time: 97 minutes
- Countries: Australia; United States
- Language: English
- Budget: $80 million
- Box office: $140.1 million

Legend of the Guardians: The Owls of Ga'Hoole is a 2010 animated fantasy action-adventure film directed by Zack Snyder. Based on the Guardians of Ga'Hoole book series by Kathryn Lasky, the film was written by John Orloff and Emil Stern and features the voices of Helen Mirren, Geoffrey Rush, Jim Sturgess, Hugo Weaving, Emily Barclay, Abbie Cornish, Ryan Kwanten, Anthony LaPaglia, Miriam Margolyes, Sam Neill, Richard Roxburgh, and David Wenham. An international co-production between Australia and the United States, the film was produced by Village Roadshow Pictures and Animal Logic, following their success with the 2006 film Happy Feet. In the film, Soren (Sturgess), a barn owl, is kidnapped and taken to St. Aegolius Academy for Orphaned Owls led by Metal Beak (Joel Edgerton) and Nyra (Mirren), where owlets are brainwashed into becoming supremacist soldiers. He befriends a fellow owl named Gylfie (Barclay), and they later escape the facility and sets out to find the Island of Ga'Hoole to rally the Guardians for war.

Legend of the Guardians was theatrically released in RealD 3D and IMAX 3D in North America on September 24, 2010, and in Australia on September 30, 2010, by Warner Bros. Pictures; it was accompanied by a new 3D Looney Tunes cartoon entitled Fur of Flying. The film received mixed reviews from critics, who praised its dark tone, animation and voice acting, but criticized the changes made to the source material and grossed $140.1 million worldwide against a budget of $80 million.

== Plot ==
A young barn owl named Soren lives in the kingdom of Tyto Forest with his family and enjoys listening to his father's stories of the "Guardians of Ga'Hoole," valiant warrior owls who fought the evil Pure Ones. Soren's older brother Kludd becomes jealous after Soren starts learning how to fly faster than him, and pushes him off a branch, causing them both to fall to the ground. They are attacked by a Tasmanian devil, and then they are rescued but kidnapped by Jatt and Jutt, two owls who work for the Pure Ones, and taken to the St. Aegolius Academy for Orphaned Owls.

The Pure Ones' queen, Nyra, announces that the owls will either become soldiers or pickers (owls who find " flecks," bits of magnetic metal used to build a superweapon). While Kludd becomes a soldier, Soren and another owl named Gylfie become pickers and are put through a brainwashing process called "moon-blinking," but they resist. A boreal owl named Grimble, who is not truly a Pure One, teaches them to fly and tells them to find the Great Tree of Ga'Hoole, but Nyra finds out and kills him. Soren and Gylfie escape and soon meet two more owls named Digger and Twilight. In their hollow, Soren reunites with Mrs. P, a western blind snake who is his family's nest maid. She agrees to go with them and find the Guardians.

The owls fly toward the sea of Hoolemere and reach the legendary shrine of the Guardians, guarded by an oracular echidna who helps the owls find the Island of Ga'Hoole. While flying, the band encounter a fierce snowstorm and Digger's wings freeze, causing him to fall into the sea. They are saved by two owls Boron and Barran, king and queen of the Guardians, and are led to the Great Tree of Ga'Hoole, where Soren tells the Guardians about the Pure Ones' plans. Boron sends a great grey owl called Allomere out to investigate St. Aegolius.

The owls stay in the Tree of Ga'Hoole and are looked after by a young short-eared owl named Otulissa, whom Soren falls in love with. One day, Soren learns that Ezylryb, his teacher, is really Lyze of Kiel, who defeated Metal Beak, Nyra's mate. Allomere returns from his scouting mission with news that his two wingmen were killed in an ambush. He brings back two moon-blinked owlets, one of which is Soren's younger sister Eglantine. The Guardians prepare for battle and fly toward St. Aegolius. Eglantine tells Soren that it was Kludd who moon-blinked her and gave her to Allomere, confirming that Allomere is a traitor and the Guardians are actually flying into a trap. At St. Aegolius, they find Metal Beak holding the Guardians captive in a magnetic field guarded by bats.

While Twilight, Gylfie and Digger fend off the bats and Lyze duels Metal Beak, Soren navigates his way through a forest fire and lights a lamp, which he smashes against the magnets' ropes, sealing their covers and neutralizing the trap. Kludd attacks him out of rage. Soren is shocked that his brother has become a Pure One, to which a glory-obsessed Kludd tells him that the Pure Ones believe in him in a way he is never felt before. Kludd continues to attack Soren until Kludd breaks his wing and falls to his apparent death into the fire below. When he is attacked by Metal Beak, Soren grabs a flaming branch and stabs him to death, causing Nyra to retreat with the remaining Pure Ones.

Returning to the tree, Soren, Gylfie, Digger, and Twilight are initiated as new Guardians. Later, Soren tells the story to a group of owlets, revealing that Nyra is still out there and that Kludd's body was never retrieved. However, a shadowy owl with glowing red Pure One eyes, who resembles Kludd, is shown staring at Metal Beak's mask, implying that Kludd survived and he claims it and becomes the new Metal Beak. The owls flies off into another storm.

== Voice cast ==
- Jim Sturgess as Soren, a barn owlet and the main protagonist who loves telling the stories about the Guardians.
- Emily Barclay as Gylfie, an elf owlet who becomes Soren's best friend.
- Ryan Kwanten as Kludd, a barn owlet and Soren's jealous and bitter older brother who becomes a soldier for the Pure Ones and Metal Beak's lieutenant. In the movie, he is a separate character from Metal Beak.
- David Wenham as Digger, a burrowing owl who becomes friends with Soren and Gylfie.
- Anthony LaPaglia as Twilight, a great grey owl and Digger's hollowmate who also becomes friends with Soren and Gylfie.
- Helen Mirren as Nyra, a barn owl who is the queen of the Pure Ones.
- Geoffrey Rush as Ezylryb/Lyze of Kiel, a whiskered screech owl and the legendary retired soldier leader of the Guardians of Ga'Hoole who's Soren's idol.
- Joel Edgerton as Metal Beak, a greater sooty owl, Ezylryb's archnemesis and Nyra's mate who is king of the Pure Ones. His name was revealed as Surtr in the video game.
- Hugo Weaving as:
  - Noctus, a barn owl, and Soren's father.
  - Grimble, a boreal owl who helps Soren and Gylfie escape St Aegolius and is killed by Nyra.
- Adrienne DeFaria as Eglantine, a barn owlet and Kludd and Soren's younger sister who is moon blinked and given to Allomere for the Great Tree of Ga'Hoole.
- Miriam Margolyes as Mrs. Plithiver, a snake and the Alba family nursemaid.
- Sam Neill as Allomere, a great grey owl and a spy for Metal Beak.
- Sacha Horler as Strix Struma, a short-eared owl and a Guardian.
- Abbie Cornish as Otulissa, a short-eared owl and resident of the Great Tree of Ga'Hoole who Soren develops a crush on at first sight.
- Richard Roxburgh as Boron, a snowy owl and the king of Ga'Hoole.
- Essie Davis as Marella, a barn owl and Soren's mother.
- Deborra-Lee Furness as Barran, a snowy owl and the queen of Ga'Hoole who is Boron's mate.
- Barry Otto as The Echidna, an echidna who helps the Band get to Ga'Hoole.
- Leigh Whannell and Angus Sampson as Jatt and Jutt, two long-eared owl cousins who work for the Pure Ones.
- Bill Hunter as Bubo, a great horned owl and blacksmith of the Great Tree.
- Gareth Young as Pete, a screech owlet who gets kidnapped by the Pure Ones and taken to St Aggie's but gets rescued by the end of the film.

== Production ==
=== Development ===
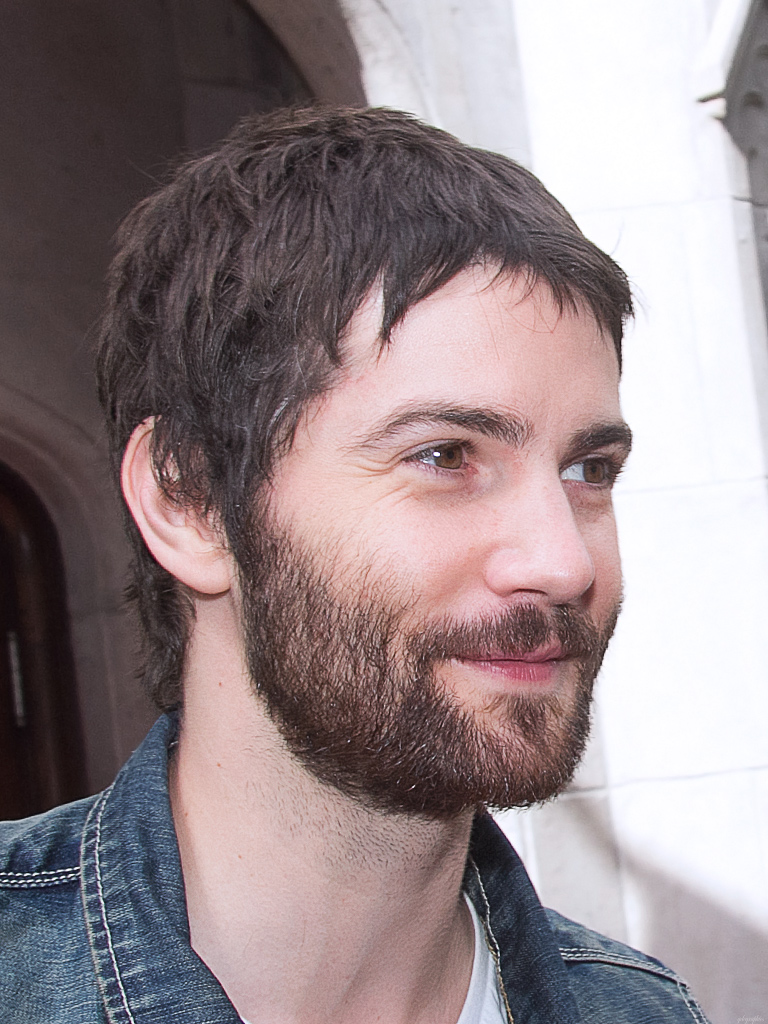
Jim Sturgess
(Soren)

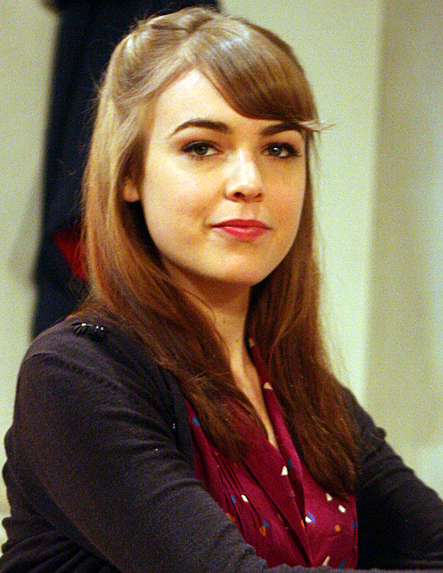
Emily Barclay
(Gylfie)

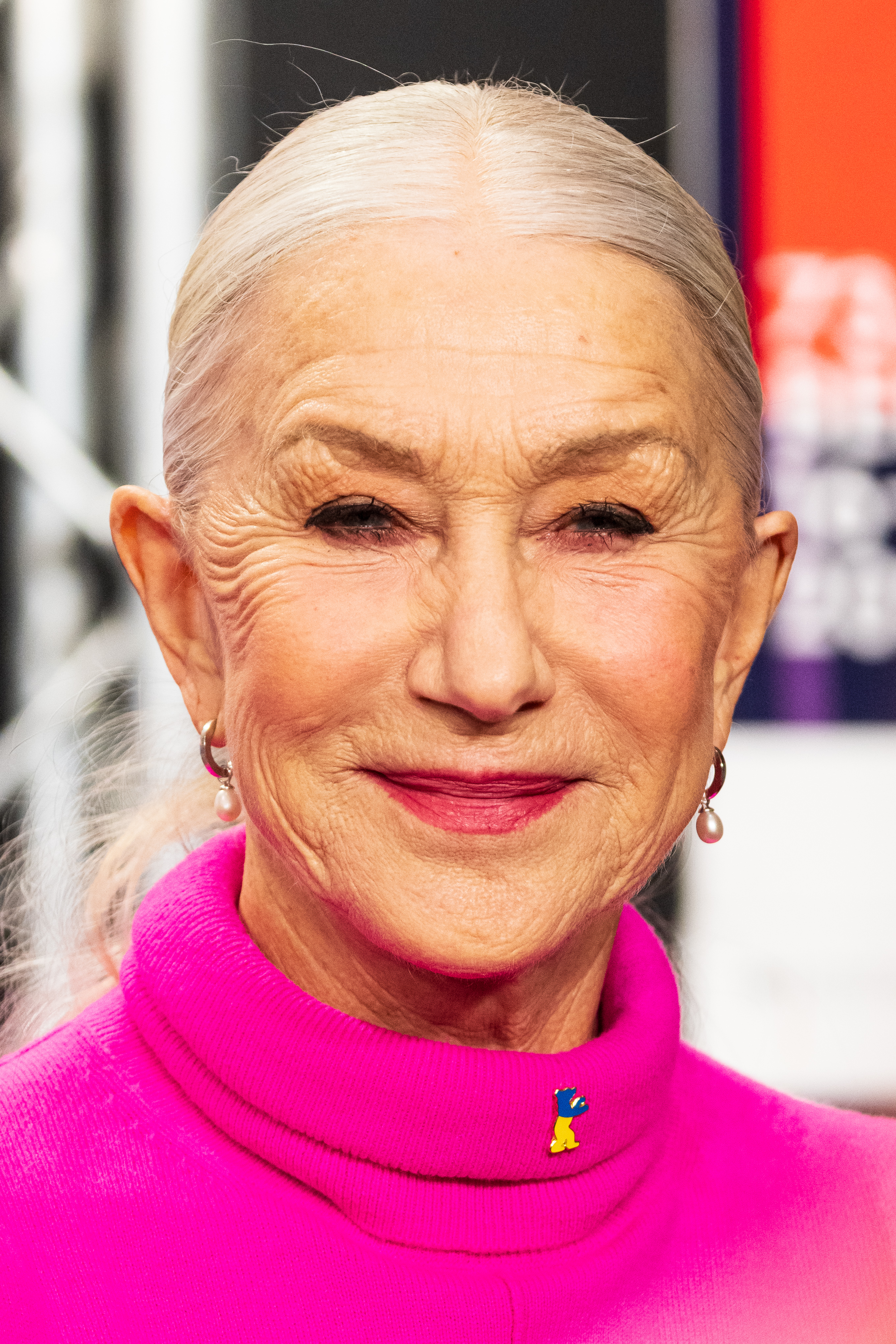
Helen Mirren
(Nyra)

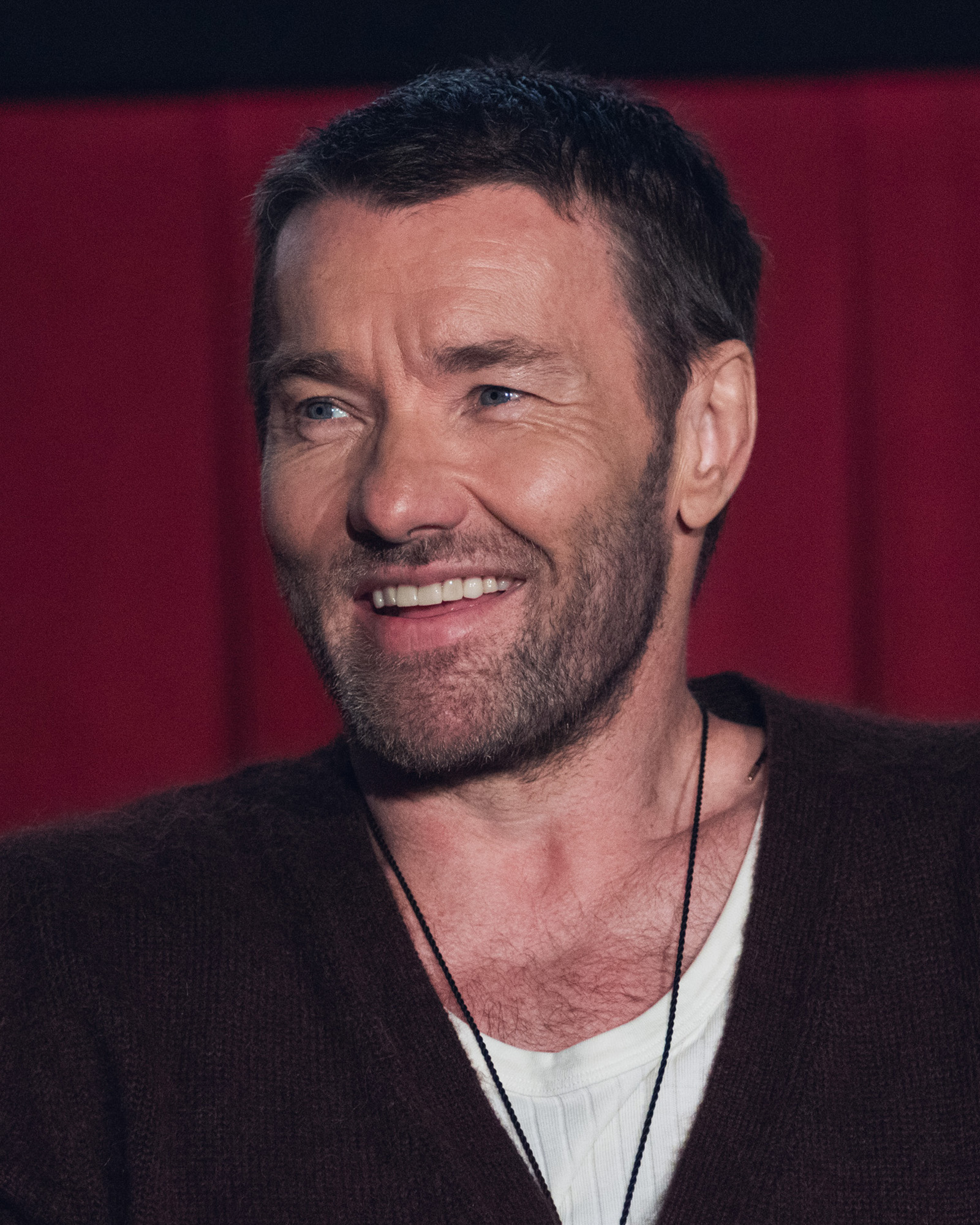
Joel Edgerton
(Metal Beak)

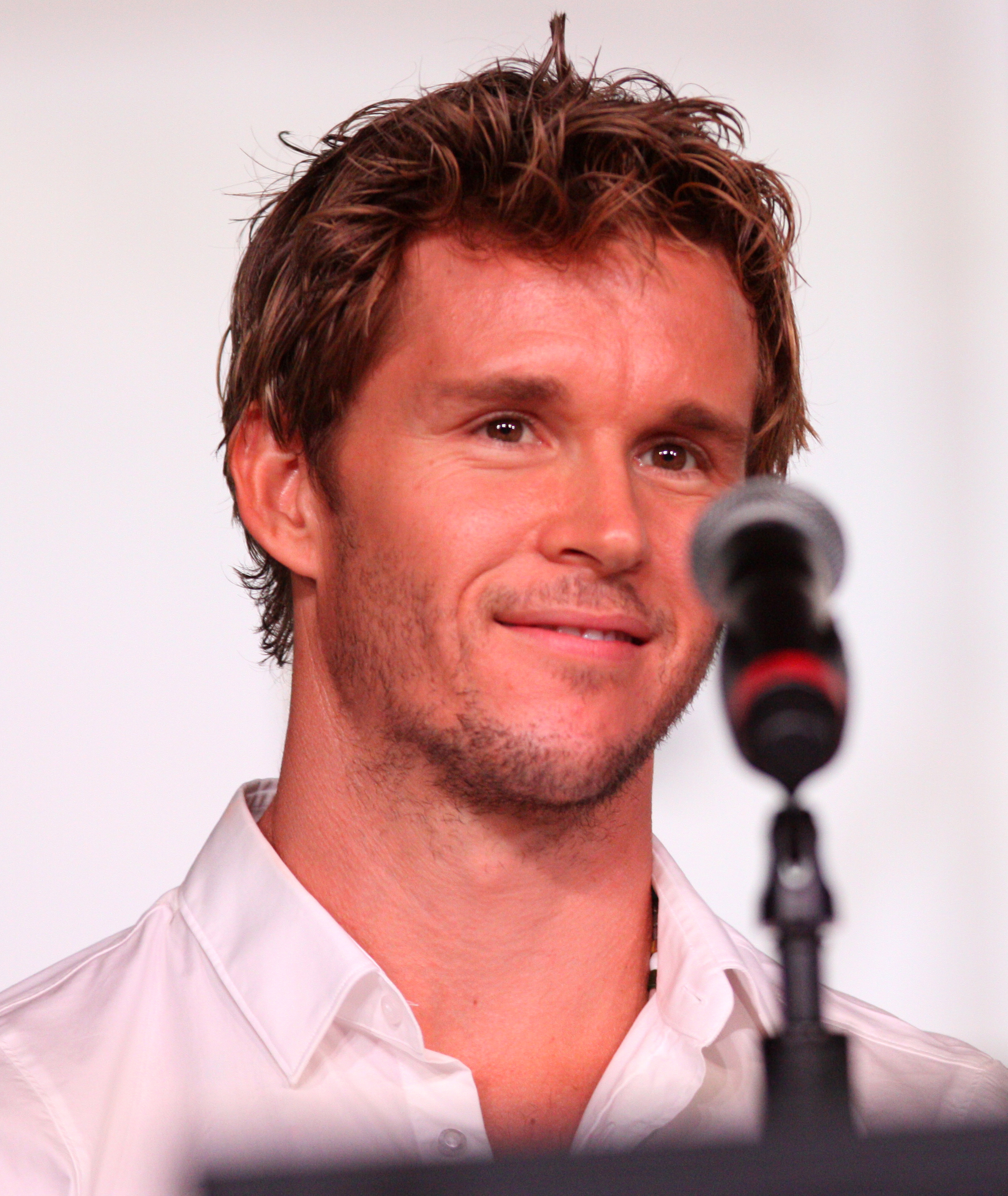
Ryan Kwanten
(Kludd)

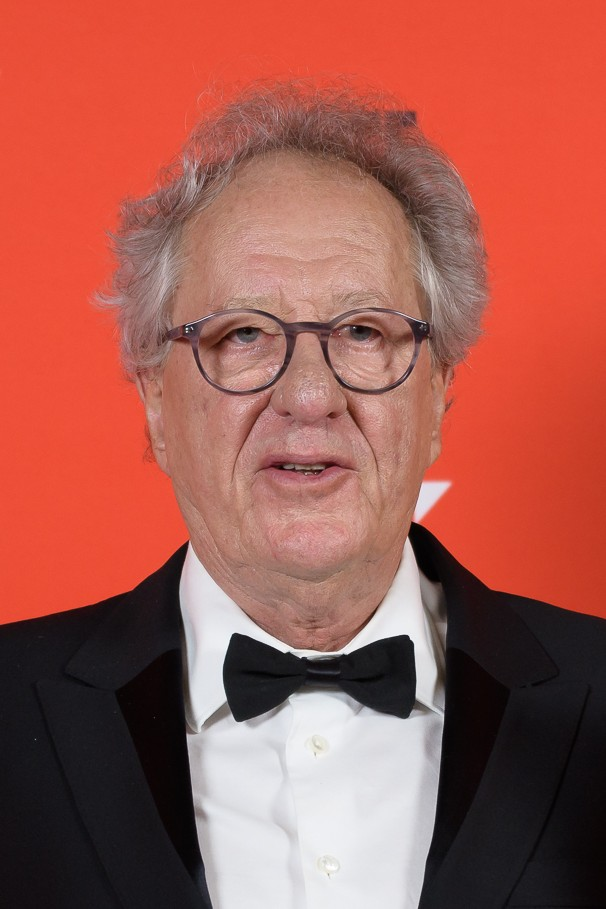
Geoffrey Rush
(Ezylryb/Lyze of Kiel)

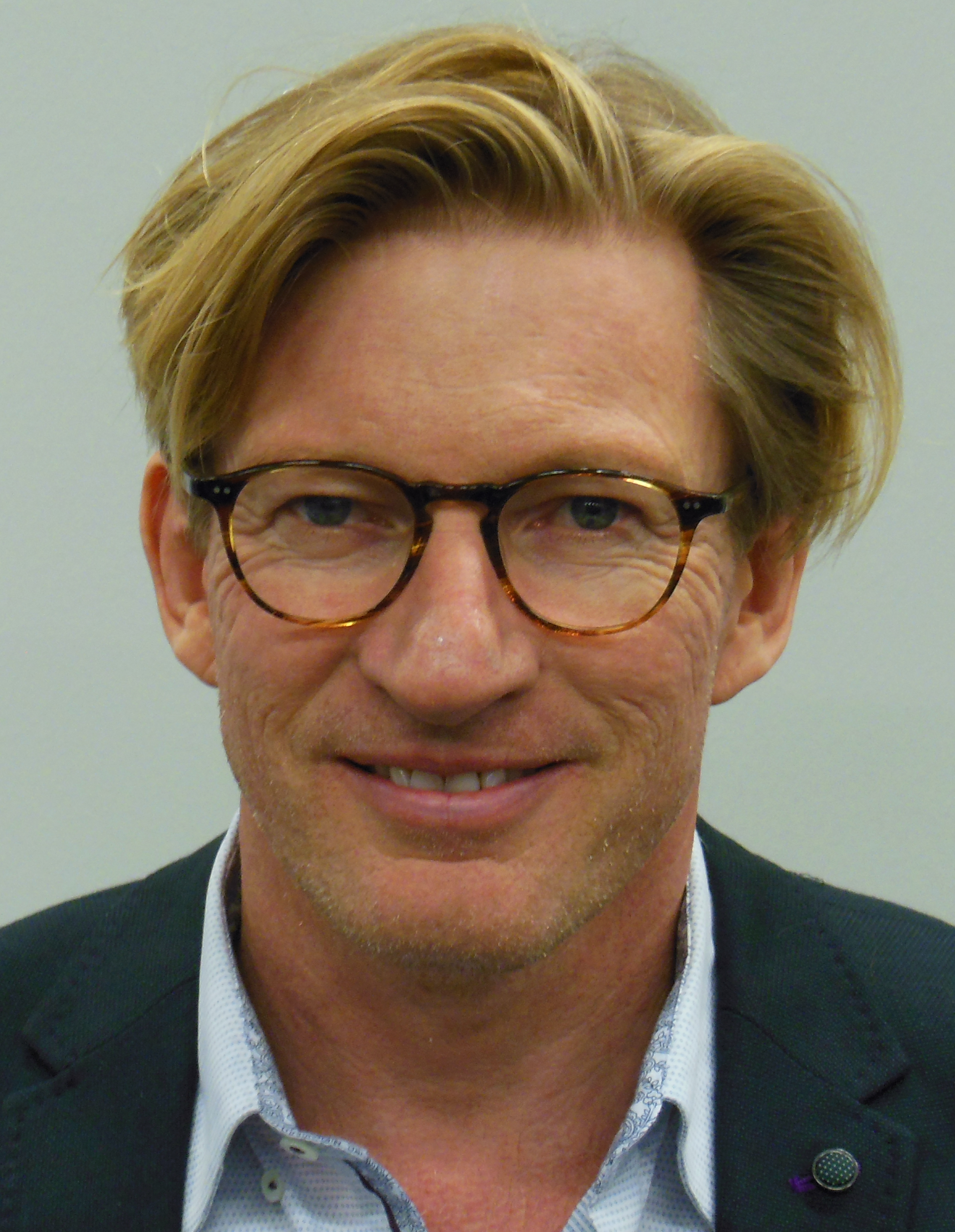
David Wenham
(Digger)

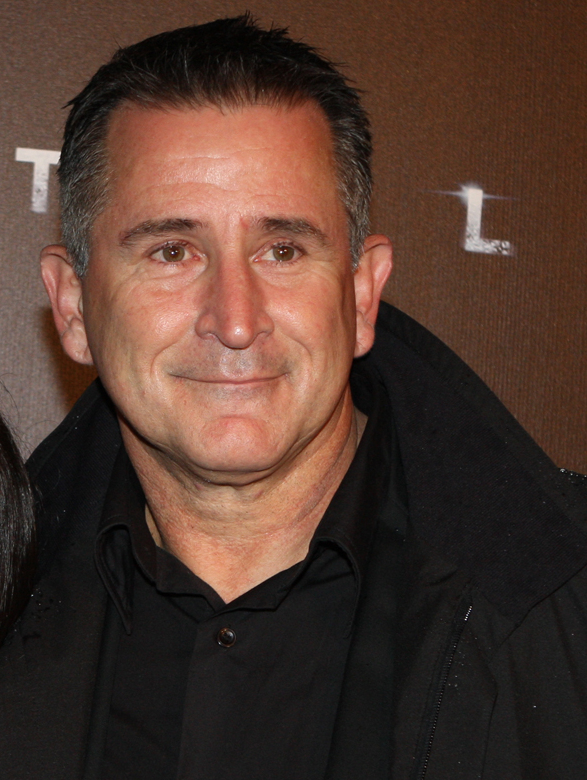
Anthony LaPaglia
(Twilight)

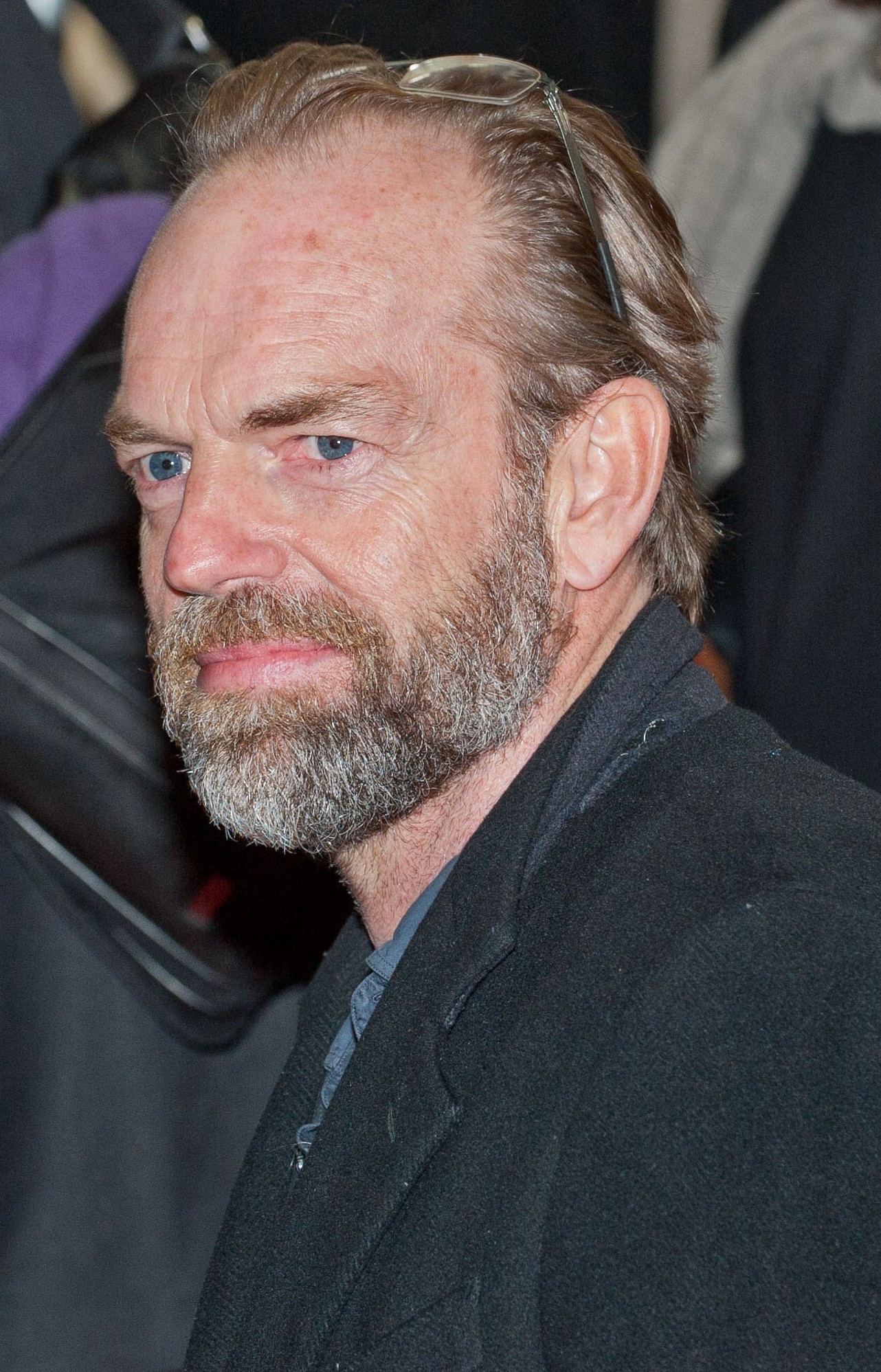
Hugo Weaving
(Noctus, Grimble)

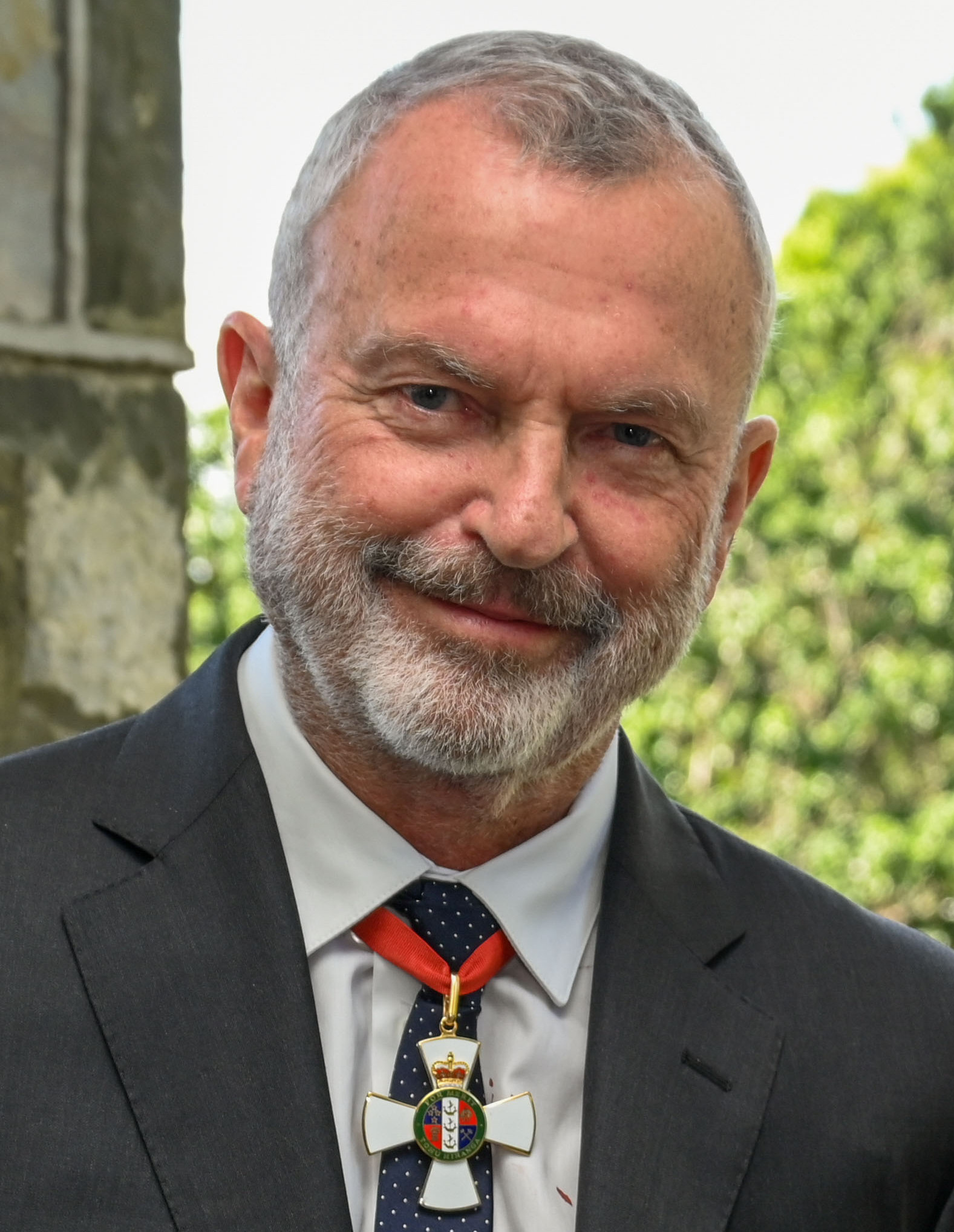
Sam Neill
(Allomere)

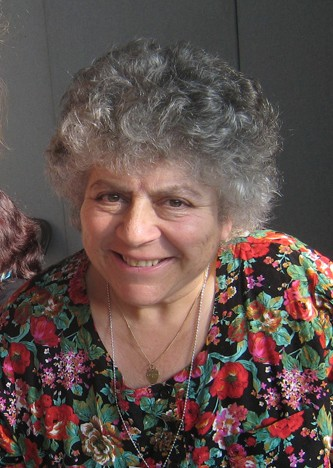
Miriam Margolyes
(Mrs. Plithiver)

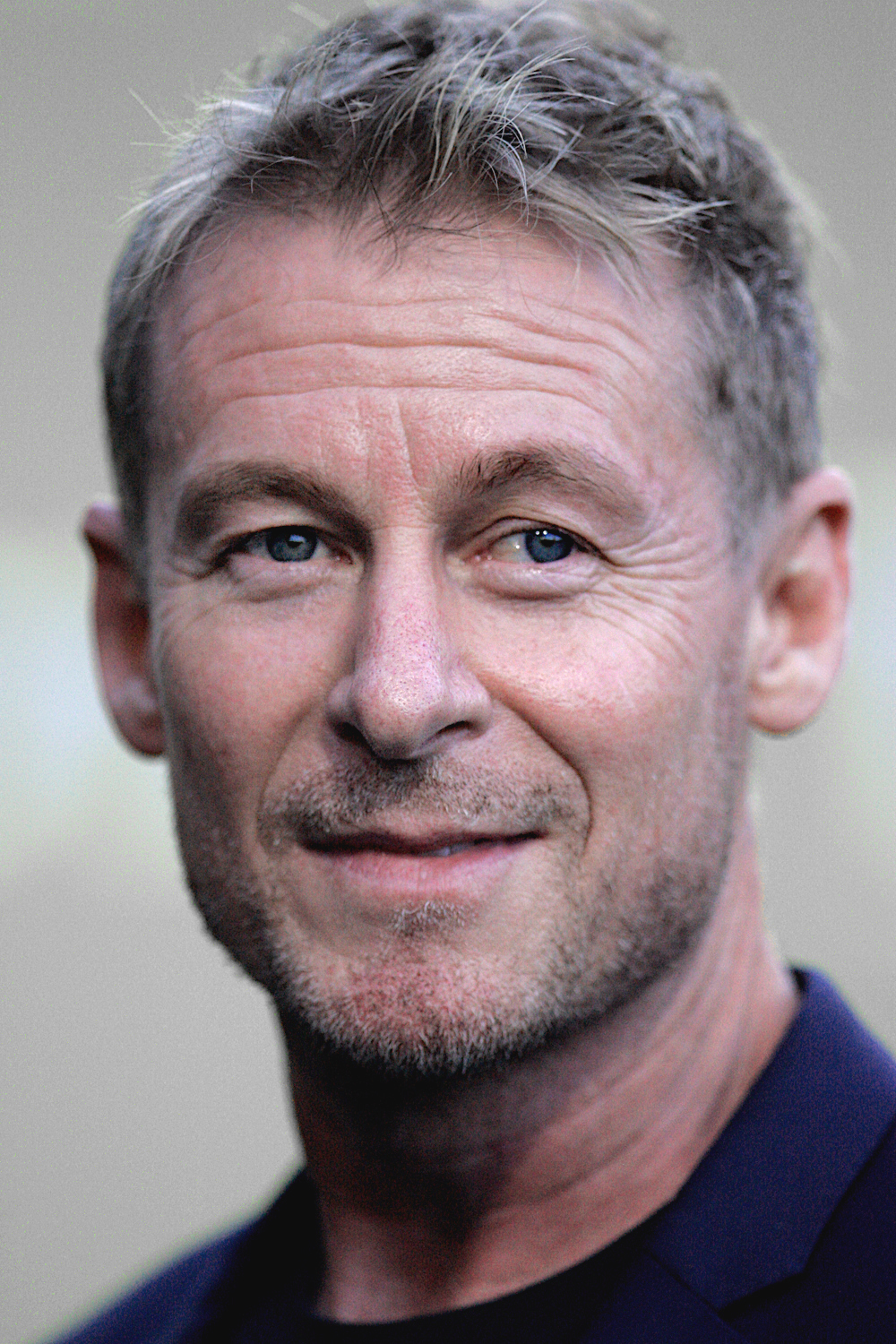
Richard Roxburgh
(Boron)

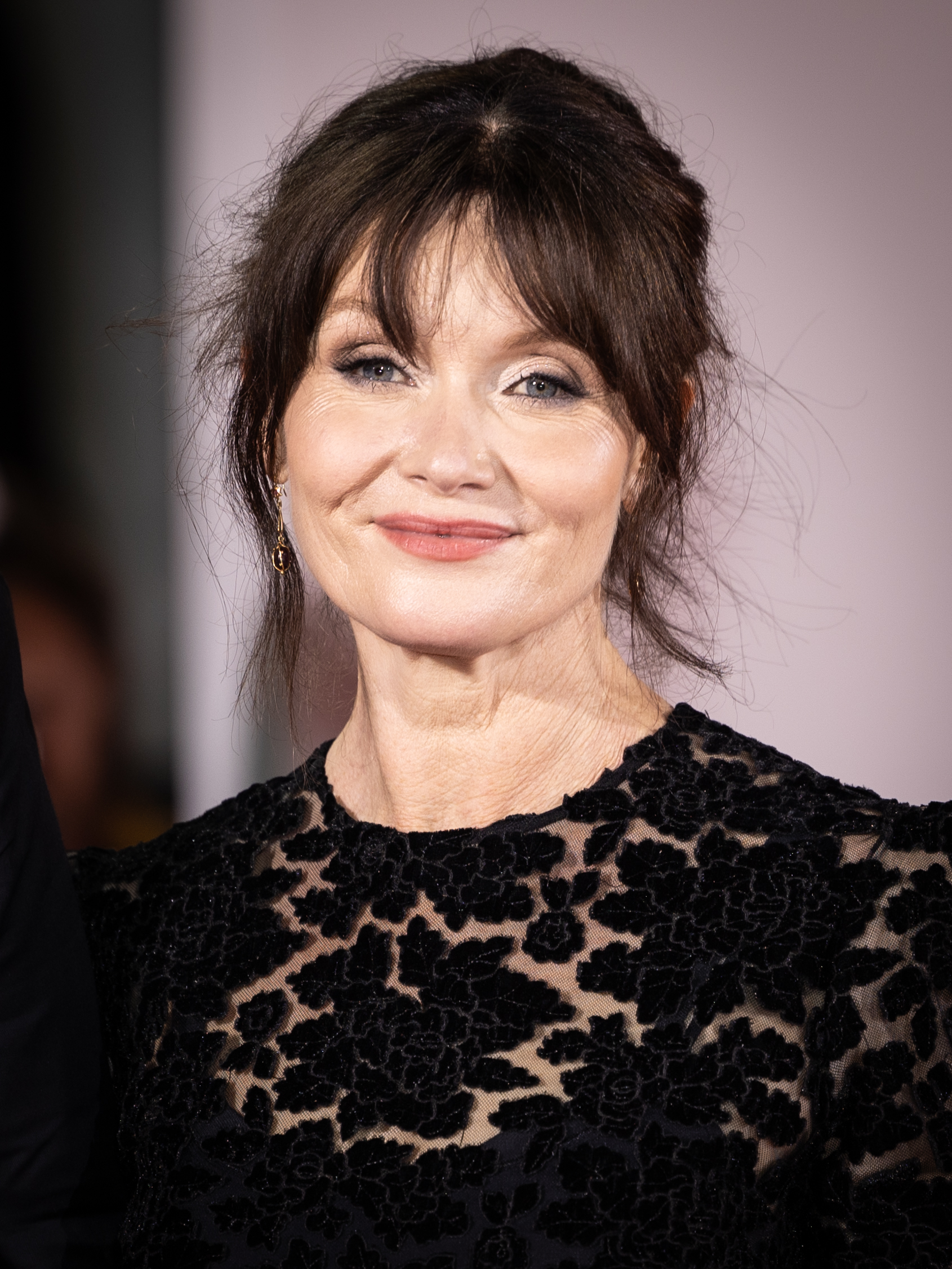
Essie Davis
(Marella)

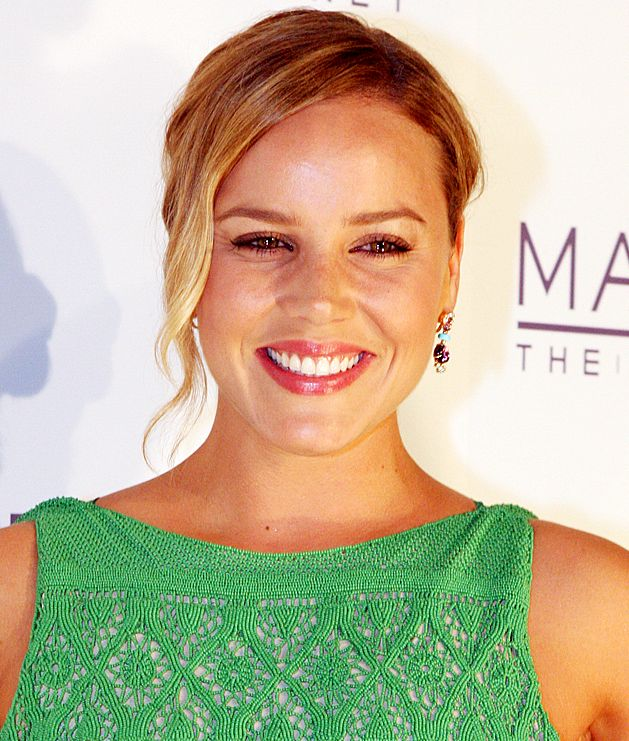
Abbie Cornish
(Otulissa)

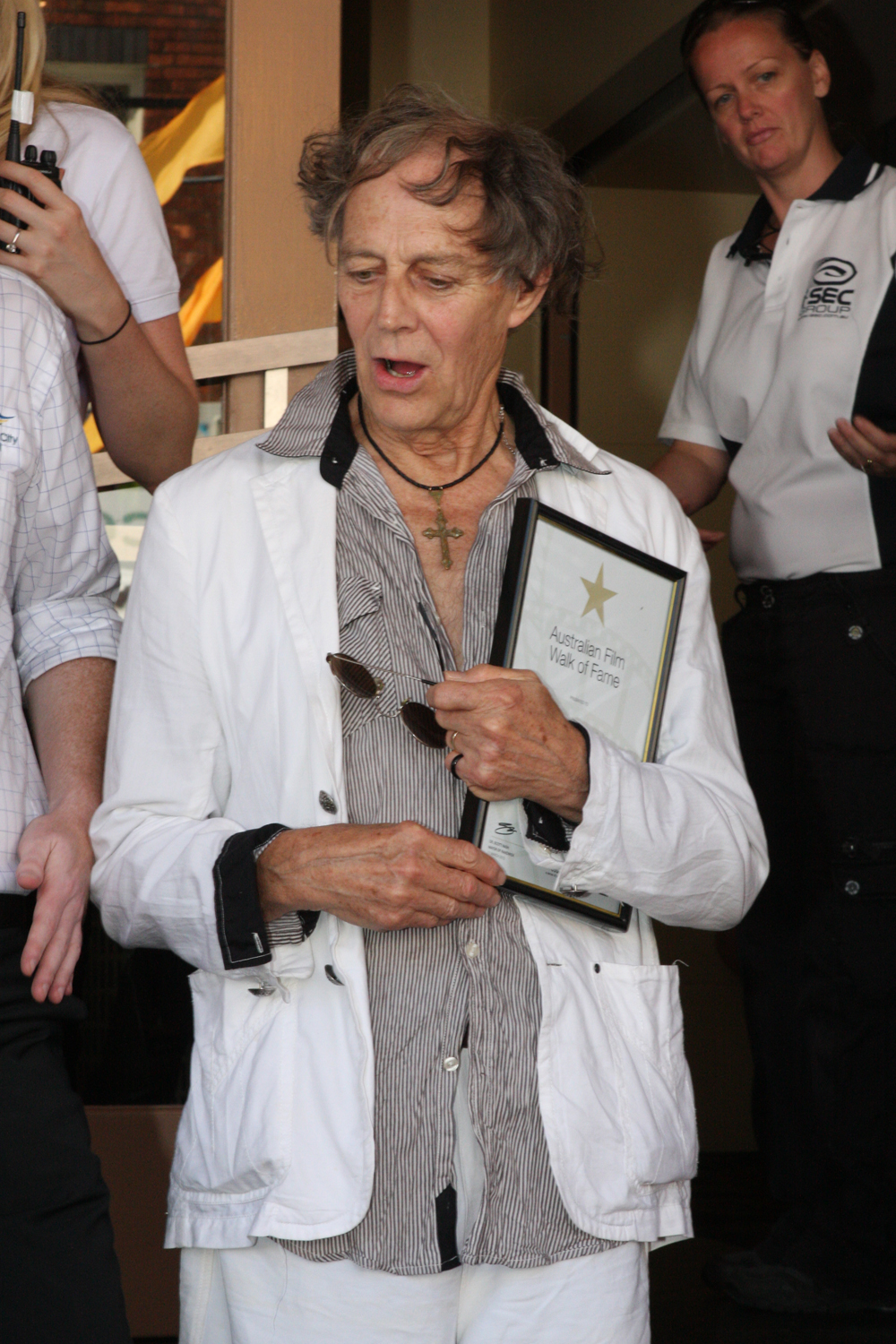
Barry Otto
(Echidna)

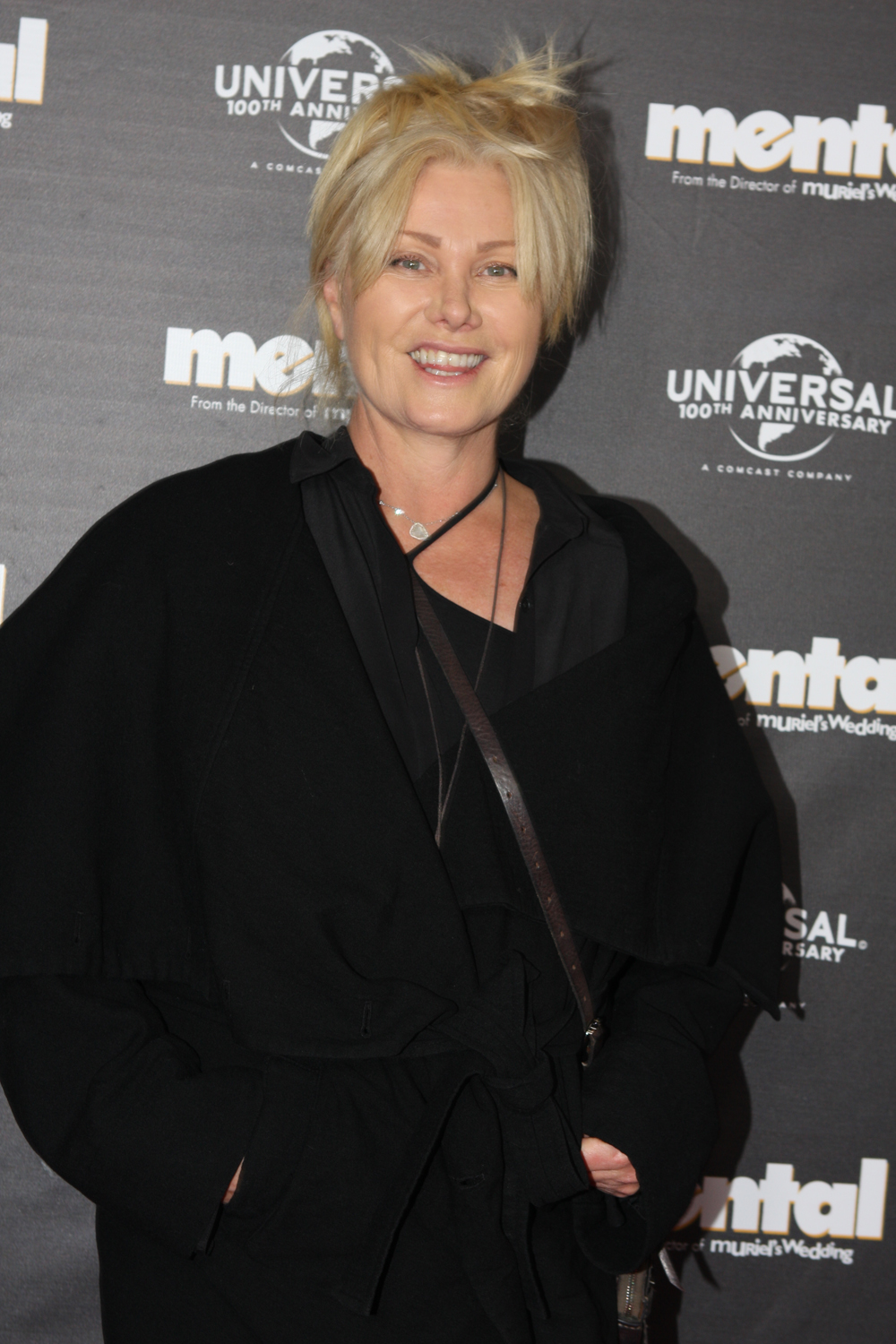
Deborra-Lee Furness
(Barran)

Warner Bros. Pictures acquired the rights to produce an animated film to the book series Guardians of Ga'Hoole by Kathryn Lasky in June 2005. Donald De Line was set to produce the film and Lasky was set to write the screenplay. In April 2008, Zack Snyder signed on as director, Zareh Nalbandian took over as producer and a new screenplay was written by John Orloff and Emil Stern. Production began in Australia in February 2009.

Collee was originally going to write the script, but was replaced by Emil Stern.

=== Animation ===
The film's animation process took place at Animal Logic's headquarters in Sydney, Australia. A team of over 500 artists, technicians and support staff were amassed to design and animate 15 unique species of owls, as well as other forest creatures such as snakes, crows, bats, centipedes, bees, beetles, moths, a hermit crab, a Tasmanian devil, and an echidna.

The animated end credits sequence shows the adventures of Soren, Gylfie, Digger and Twilight as told by the young owls as if they were putting on a shadow play performance in the Great Tree. This idea was conceived by Felicity Coonan and took around three months to animate. Coonan wanted the sequence to be a playful experiment in 2D and 3D, as the classic storytelling form of shadow puppets is a 2D medium. The credits were designed to be legible without 3D glasses.

=== Casting ===
Much of the cast was announced in the early months of 2009. Hugh Jackman, Hugo Weaving and Ryan Kwanten were announced in January; Jim Sturgess, Geoffrey Rush, Rachael Taylor, and David Wenham in February; and Emilie de Ravin in March.

The rest of the cast was announced in November 2009, including Emily Barclay, Abbie Cornish, Jay Laga'aia, Miriam Margolyes, Helen Mirren, and Sam Neill who replaced Jackman in the role of Allomere.

However, like Jackman, both Taylor and Ravin were also no longer in the film. Laga’aia was also going to voice Twilight, but was replaced by Anthony LaPaglia. Ravin has a role in the film, but she was replaced in the final cut.

== Release ==
Legend of the Guardians: The Owls of Ga'Hoole was theatrically released in the United States on September 24, 2010, and in Australia on September 30, 2010. After Village Roadshow Pictures filed for Chapter 11 bankruptcy in March 2025, with its library sold to Alcon Entertainment for $417.5 million on June 18, 2025, Warner Bros. Pictures (via Warner Bros. Pictures Animation and Alcon Entertainment) distributed the film worldwide, with Roadshow Films distributing in Australia and New Zealand.

=== Home media ===
Legend of the Guardians: The Owls of Ga'Hoole was released on Blu-ray 3D, Blu-ray, and DVD on December 17, 2010. Each format includes a documentary featurette about owls, entitled True Guardians of the Earth, featuring ornithologists and conservationists, and presented by child actor Rico Rodriguez and character Digger the Owl (voiced by David Wenham). The cartoon Fur of Flying is also included on the DVD.

=== Video game ===
Warner Bros. Interactive Entertainment released a video game based on the film for the Wii, Xbox 360, PlayStation 3, and Nintendo DS platforms on September 14, 2010. The game was developed by Krome Studios for Wii, Xbox 360, and PlayStation 3 while the Nintendo DS version was developed by Tantalus Media.

== Reception ==
=== Box office ===
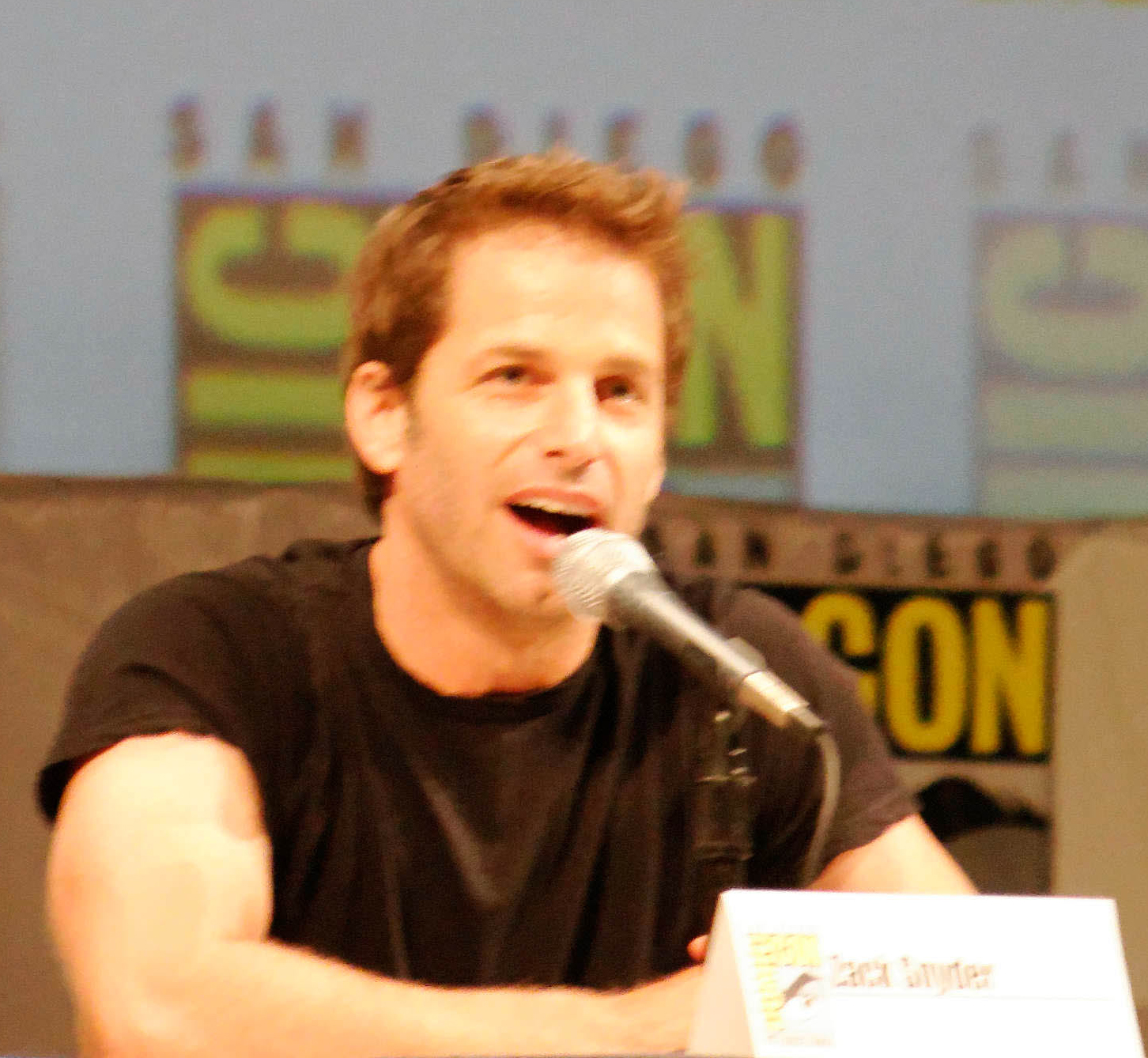
Zack Snyder (pictured in 2010) the director of Legend of the Guardians: The Owls of Ga'Hoole.

In the US it took in $5.5 million on opening day, ranking third at the box office in the US. It ranked second on Saturday, earning $6 million, and was No. 1 on Sunday, earning $4.6 million (US). Overall, it earned $16,112,211 on its opening weekend, reaching second place at the box office behind Wall Street: Money Never Sleeps in America. This makes Legend of the Guardians Zack Snyder's first film not to reach No. 1 on its opening weekend in the US.

In its second weekend, the film slipped 32% to $10,887,543 and held on to second place, this time behind The Social Network, claiming the title of the biggest second-weekend hold for an animated feature in 2010. The film ended its run in January 2011 with a $55.7 million domestic (US) gross. The film also grossed over $84 million from its international release, bringing its global box office total to $140,073,390.

=== Critical response ===
Review aggregator website Rotten Tomatoes reports that 52% of 133 sampled critics gave the film positive reviews and that it has received an average rating of 5.70/10. The site's critical consensus reads, "Legend of the Guardians' dark tone and dazzling visuals are to be admired, even if they're ultimately let down by a story that never lives up to its full potential." On Metacritic, the film has a weighted average score of 53 out of 100 based on 21 critics, indicating "mixed or average" reviews. Audiences polled by CinemaScore gave the film an average grade of "A−" on an A+ to F scale.

Peter Bradshaw of The Guardian gave the film a score of 3/5 stars, describing it as a "likable family movie" and writing: "It's all very weird sometimes, but engaging: a nice half-term treat for younger children." John Walsh of The Independent wrote: "The stars of this computerised epic are the Design and Art departments, who provide stunning landscapes, caves and kingdoms, and whose 3D magic is genuinely thrilling", but added: "The dark atmosphere and violent fights would scare most under-nines." Stephen Cole of The Globe and Mail gave the film a score of 3/4 stars, describing it as "a splendid adventure sure to thrill children and fantasy buffs, while leaving everyone else passably entertained."

Tim Robey of The Daily Telegraph gave the film a score of 2/5 stars, praising the film's visuals, but criticizing its dialogue and humor. He concluded: "We're left with something gorgeous, turgid, and emotionally impenetrable – less a movie, more an Imax screensaver." Andy Webster of The New York Times wrote that the film "may be a hoot, but for all its pyrotechnics, it fails to soar." Sandra Hall of The Sydney Morning Herald wrote: "It takes a certain knack to make a film which has a sinister feel to it without being the least bit exciting but Snyder has done it with this one."

=== Accolades ===
Group	Category	Recipient	Result
38th Annie Awards	Animated Effects in an Animated Production	Sebastian Quessy	Nominated
38th Annie Awards	Music in a Feature Production	David Hirschfelder	Nominated
38th Annie Awards	Production Design in a Feature Production	Dan Hee Ryu	Nominated
38th Annie Awards	Voice Acting in a Feature Production	Geoffrey Rush	Nominated
Visual Effects Society Awards 2010	Outstanding Animation in an Animated Feature Motion Picture		Nominated
Visual Effects Society Awards 2010	Outstanding Animated Character in an Animated Feature Motion Picture		Nominated
Satellite Awards	Motion Picture, Animated or Mixed Media		Nominated
Saturn Awards	Best Animated Film		Nominated
AACTA Awards	Best Visual Effects	Grant Freckelton	Won
AACTA Awards	Best Sound		Nominated

- Snippets of the film were shown when the company behind the animation, Animal Logic won the Byron Kennardy Award.

== Future ==
There hasn't been anything specific around a second Legend of the Guardians at this stage. We have discussions with Warner Bros. across a range of projects; we have projects in development with them, as well as projects in development outside of Warner Bros. Legend ... lines up alongside all the projects we have, in terms of what's the most attractive, commercial proposition to do next.

— Zareh Nalbandian in an interview with Encore

According to Animal Logic's CEO, Zareh Nalbandian, there were discussions for a sequel to Legend of the Guardians: The Owls of Ga'Hoole as of 2011, but nothing solid as to when production would begin, as such a sequel would come in behind several other films Animal Logic will be producing or already is producing with Warner Bros.

Jim Sturgess and Ryan Kwanten have both said in a 2010 interview that they would reprise their roles as Soren and Kludd if a sequel ever entered production.

== Soundtrack ==
WaterTower Music released the film's official soundtrack on September 21, 2010. The album includes thirteen score tracks composed by David Hirschfelder. The soundtrack also includes the song "To the Sky", Owl City wrote exclusively for the film.
