= Ashes (2012 film) =

- DVD cover
- Directed by: Mat Whitecross
- Written by: Paul Viragh
- Produced by: Esther Douglas; Fiona Neilson
- Starring: Luke Evans; Jim Sturgess; Ray Winstone; Jodie Whittaker; Lesley Manville; Zoe Telford
- Cinematography: Christopher Ross
- Edited by: Peter Christelis
- Music by: Ilan Eshkeri; Tim Wheeler
- Release date: 21 November 2012 (Foyle Film Festival)
- Running time: 101 minutes
- Country: United Kingdom
- Language: English

Ashes is a 2012 British thriller film directed by Mat Whitecross and starring Luke Evans, Jim Sturgess, Ray Winstone, Jodie Whittaker, Lesley Manville, and Zoe Telford.

== Premise ==
Frank is confined to a residential home, suffering from Alzheimer's disease with his past, present, and future slowly breaking down. One day, a young man named James visits, wanting to reconnect with a father who no longer remembers him. James breaks Frank out of the home and the pair go on the run together. As their spontaneous journey unfolds, the present combines with incomplete memories of the past, fact mixes with fiction, and it becomes apparent that nothing is quite what it seems.

== Cast ==
- Luke Evans as JB
- Jim Sturgess as James
- Ray Winstone as Frank
- Jodie Whittaker as Ruth
- Lesley Manville as Cath
- Zoe Telford as Sophie
