= Nestor Serrano =

American actor

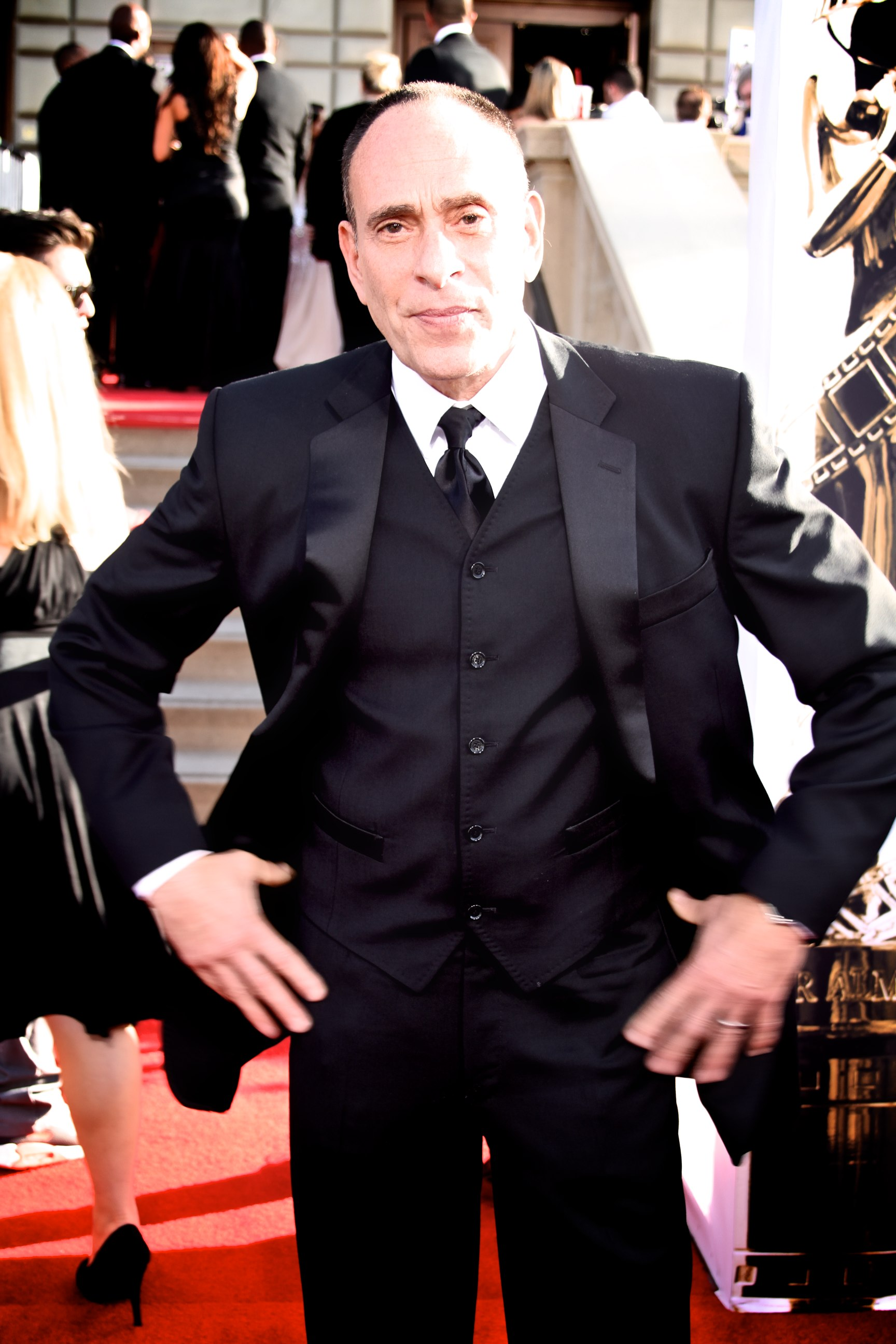
- Serrano at the 2014 Alma Awards
- Born: November 5, 1955 (age 70); The Bronx, New York, U.S.
- Occupation: Actor
- Years active: 1982–present

Nestor Serrano (born November 5, 1955) is an American film and television actor. He is known for playing Detective Sanchez in Bad Boys and Navi Araz in the fourth season of 24. He also appeared as Emilio Loera in the fourth season of the Cinemax series Banshee.

== Early life ==
Serrano was born in New York City, and studied at Queens College and the Lee Strasberg Theatre and Film Institute, both in New York City.

== Career ==
Serrano began his acting career in off-Broadway plays in the late 1970s. He often portrays authority figures on both sides of the law. His first film was the 1986 Tom Hanks comedy The Money Pit. Since then, he has appeared in supporting roles in films such as Lethal Weapon 2, Bad Boys, The Negotiator, Empire, Secretariat, The Insider, Runaway Jury and The Day After Tomorrow.

He has an extensive television résumé, with appearances in shows such as Burn Notice, Homeland, Alias, Blue Bloods, and Law & Order and its spin-offs: SVU, Trial by Jury, and Criminal Intent.

Serrano is well known for playing Islamic terrorist Navi Araz in 24. He played Bobby's father on an episode of Ugly Betty. He played Victor, Adrianna Tate-Duncan's manager, on the CW show 90210. He made a guest-appearance on the Criminal Minds episode "Poison" as Det. Hanover, and he portrayed drug cartel leader Hector Estrada in Season 7 of the Showtime series Dexter. He played Carlos Solano, leader of the Solano Cartel in the USA show Graceland. In 2017, he played the psychiatrist Dr. Saul in the movie thriller Clinical.

== Personal life ==
Serrano is of Puerto Rican descent.

== Filmography ==
=== Films ===
Year	Title	Role	Notes	Ref.
1986	The Money Pit	Handyman		
1989	Lethal Weapon 2	Eddie Estaban		
1991	Hangin' with the Homeboys	Fernando (aka Vinny)		
1995	Bad Boys	Detective Sanchez		
1996	City Hall	Det. Eddie Santos		
1996	Daylight	Weller		
1998	The Negotiator	Hellman		
1999	Bringing Out the Dead	Doctor Hazmat		
2000	Ready to Run	Hector Machado	TV film	
2001	After the Storm	Ortega		
2002	Empire	Rafael Mendoza		
2003	Runaway Jury	Janovich		
2004	The Day After Tomorrow	Tom Gomez		
2005	Sueño	El Zorro		
2008	Definitely, Maybe	Arthur Robredo		
2009	Falling Awake	Lazaro		
2010	Secretariat	Pancho Martin		
2010	Cielito Lindo	Matador		
2012	Act of Valor	Walter Ross		
2014	Captain America: The Winter Soldier	Committee General		
2014	Sniper: Legacy	Steffen	Direct-to-DVD	
2017	Clinical	Dr. Saul		

=== Television ===
Year	Title	Role	Notes	Ref.
1986	The Equalizer	Barry	Episode: "Tip on a Sure Thing"	
1988	Hunter	Jessie Cruz	2 episodes	
1989–1990	True Blue	Off. Geno Toffenelli	12 episodes	
1991	Love, Lies and Murder	Gonzalez	2 episodes	
1992–1993	The Hat Squad	Rafael	13 episodes	
1996–1997	Moloney	Lt. Matty Navarro	5 episodes	
1999	The X-Files	Ken Naciamento	Episode: "Milagro"	
2000	JAG	Captain Berroa	Episode: "Florida Straits"	
2001–2002	Witchblade	Captain Bruno Dante	10 episodes	
2002	ER	David Torres CDC	Episode: “Lockdown”	
2003	CSI: Miami	Edward Hickle	Episode: "Double Cap"	
2005	24	Navi Araz	10 episodes	
2006	Criminal Minds	Det. Hanover	Episode: "Poison"	
2008	Fringe	Henry Jacobson	Episode: "The Arrival"	
2010	Burn Notice	Tony Caro	Episode: "Made Man"	
2010	The Mentalist	Garth Drucker	Episode: "Red Hot"	
2010–2011	90210	Victor Luna	7 episodes	
2011	Homeland	Tony Trujillo	Episode: "Pilot"	
2012	Dexter	Hector Estrada	2 episodes	
2012	The Finder	Xavier Obispo	Episode: "Voodoo Undo"	
2014	Graceland	Carlos Solano Sr.	4 episodes	
2014–2015	Revenge	Chief Edward Alvarez	5 episodes	
2016	Bosch	Chief Frank Silva	2 episodes	
2016	Banshee	Emilio Loera	2 episodes	
2016	The Last Ship	Alex Rivera	9 episodes	
2017	APB	Mayor Michael Salgado	5 episodes	
2019	Love, Death & Robots	Major Graham	Voice role Episode: "Lucky 13"	
2022	FBI	Robert	Episode: "Scar Tissue"	
2022	Walker: Independence	Francis Reyes	4 episodes	

== See also ==
- List of Queens College people
