= Feed the Beast (TV series) =

American crime drama television series

- Genre: Crime drama
- Based on: Bankerot by Kim Fupz Aakeson
- Developed by: Clyde Phillips
- Starring: David Schwimmer; Jim Sturgess; Lorenza Izzo; Michael Gladis; John Doman; Christine Adams; Elijah Jacob
- Opening theme: Sasha Dobson
- Composer: Pat Irwin
- Country of origin: United States
- Original language: English
- No. of seasons: 1
- No. of episodes: 10

Production
- Executive producers: Clyde Phillips; Henrik Ruben Genz; Malene Blenkov; Piv Bernth
- Producers: Brad Carpenter; Michele Giordano
- Production locations: Kaufman Astoria Studios, Queens, New York
- Cinematography: Joe Collins
- Editors: Gary Levy; David Leonard; Joseph Hobeck
- Running time: 46 minutes
- Production companies: Clyde Phillips Productions; Lionsgate Television; AMC Studios

Original release
- Network: AMC
- Release: June 5 – August 2, 2016

Feed the Beast is an American crime drama television series based on the Danish series Bankerot by Kim Fupz Aakeson and adapted by Clyde Phillips for AMC, starring David Schwimmer and Jim Sturgess. The series premiered on June 5, 2016, on AMC. On September 2, 2016, AMC canceled the show after one season.

== Plot ==
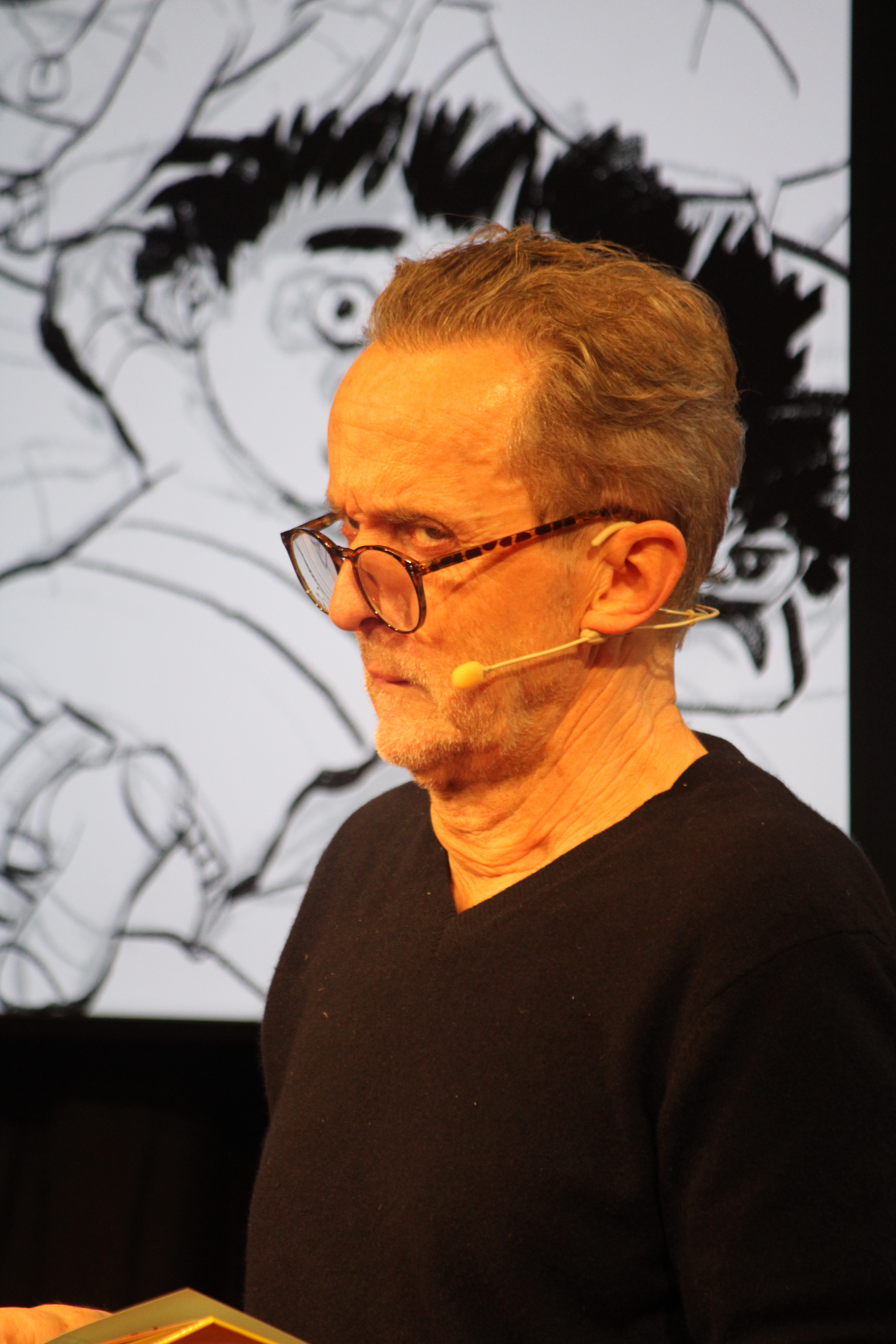
Kim Fupz Aakeson

Tommy Moran and Dion Patras are like brothers. Dion is unable to stay out of trouble and Tommy is unable to move past it. For two friends on the brink of losing everything, a dusty pipe dream of opening an upscale Greek restaurant in their hometown of the Bronx is all they have left to turn their lives around. Together, they take on the insanity of the New York restaurant world and navigate its underbelly of petty criminals, corrupt officials and violent mobsters.

== Cast ==
=== Main ===
- David Schwimmer as Thomas "Tommy" Moran, a former sommelier and functional alcoholic who is raising his ten-year-old son, TJ, after the tragic death of his wife, Rie. His dream of opening a restaurant in the Bronx with longtime friend Dion ignites a fire in him that has been absent since his loss.
- Jim Sturgess as Dion Patras, fresh out of prison and in debt to the Polish Mob, is inspired to open his dream restaurant with his childhood friend, Tommy. A rockstar chef, Dion plays a central role in both Tommy and TJ's life, all the while trying to escape his own inner demons and stay the course in his quest to be the best chef in New York.
- Lorenza Izzo as Pilar Herrera, a quirky single woman who meets Tommy in a grief group, desperately searching for true love. Her search for love has inadvertently attracted men who capitalize on her naiveté. But when she meets Tommy, her hopes are restored.
- Michael Gladis as Patrick "The Tooth Fairy" Woichik, a first-generation Polish-American, is a soft-spoken, brutally intimidating local mobster with a penchant for pulling teeth. Though he works for his father, he is also a major disappointment to him.
- John Doman as Aidan Moran, Tommy's father, a shrewd and ruthless businessman and unapologetic racist. He is a provocative and proud Irish-American and a self-made man with a personal code of business ethics, which allows plenty of room for bribery, fraud, extortion, bullying and a general embrace of New York's criminal underworld.
- Christine Adams as Rie Moran, Tommy's late wife, whose African-American roots play a strong role in Tommy's damaged relationship with his father. Remaining present in flashbacks throughout the season, Rie was a talented chef and artistic visionary for the restaurant. Her design book remains a guide for Tommy and Dion. She was a serial optimist who didn't let anyone take her down, especially Tommy's racist father. Her absence is a shroud over all of the characters.
- Elijah Jacob as Thomas "TJ" Moran Jr., Tommy and Rie's ten-year-old biracial son who is traumatized after witnessing his mother's tragic death and is unable to speak. He suffers from frequent nightmares about the accident in fractured images, but he can't piece the whole sequence together. TJ is a gifted artist, and drawing is one of the only ways he can still connect with the world.

=== Recurring ===
- Michael Rispoli as Guy Giordano, an NYPD detective with a vendetta against the Tooth Fairy
- Erin Cummings as Marisa Gallo, Dion's lawyer and Giordano's daughter
- Ella Rae Peck as Anna Davis, a counselor at Clay Avenue Middle School
- David Patrick Kelly as Ziggy Woichik, the Tooth Fairy's father
- Fredric Lehne as Kevin, a chef hired by Aidan
- Demosthenes Chrysan as Stavros, Dion's uncle
- Jacob Ming-Trent as Mose, a veteran of the war in Afghanistan, a member of Tommy and Pilar's grief group and a Thirio employee
- Joel Marsh Garland as Fiasco, one of Dion's friends and a fellow chef
- Mousa Kraish as Habib, one of Dion's friends and a fellow chef
- Kathryn Kates as Ruth Cline, Aidan's accountant
- April Hernandez-Castillo as Blanca Herrera, a restaurant manager and Pilar's older sister
- Geoffrey Cantor as Christian, Tommy and Pilar's grief group leader

== Episodes ==
No.	Title	Directed by	Written by	Original release date	US viewers (millions)
1	"Pilot Light"	Steve Shill	Clyde Phillips	June 5, 2016	0.976
Dion Patras is released from prison on early parole and is immediately hunted by Patrick Woijchik's men, members of a Polish mafia. Elsewhere, Tommy Moran visits his wife Rie's gravesite and has difficulty selling wine to local vendors. He also has to raise his mute son TJ, who expresses his emotions through his drawings. Dion's uncle Stavros has everything set up for Dion to flee to Paris, however, Patrick arrives to send Dion scrambling and introduces himself as "The Tooth Fairy" to Stavros by wielding some pliers. Dion eventually finds Tommy, and they bicker over their past: Tommy never visited Dion in prison, and Dion abused cocaine and burned down a restaurant, which ultimately caused Rie's death. Patrick finally catches Dion, and it is revealed the burned restaurant belonged to Patrick, who never got an insurance settlement. Dion promises to open another restaurant to repay Patrick and later begins convincing Tommy to help.
2	"Father of the Year"	Steve Shill	David Babcock	June 7, 2016	0.398
Dion and Tommy meet with Aidan, Tommy's father, to discuss being an investor. Aidan's coldness toward Tommy forces Dion to be the pitchman. Dion promises profit from investing in the changing neighborhood and invites Aidan to sample the menu. Meanwhile, Patrick visits his imprisoned father, Ziggy, who asks about Dion's debt. Patrick states "you can't get money out of a dead man"; Ziggy says killing Dion will send a message that will "mean something". At school, TJ continues to be bullied, which results in him getting bruised. Later at the menu sampling, Aidan agrees to invest a 50% stake in the restaurant under one condition: he sees TJ once a week. Tommy balks, but TJ nods in agreement after seeing that Aidan carries a gun. Aidan leaves a contract with them. After one such visit, Tommy sees the bruises and, believing them to be from Aidan, confronts him. He then calls Dion to cancel the arrangement with Aidan, but Dion has shown the contract to Patrick.
3	"Screw You, Randy"	Jon S. Baird	Liz Sagal	June 14, 2016	0.484
Dion corrects Tommy regarding TJ's bruises and adds that he will deal with the bully. Dion suggests Tommy reconcile with Aidan, and the two meet with him. Aidan states the deal was still on; Tommy only lost the fight. Aidan gives them a $75,000 check. At the prison, Patrick tells Ziggy that he stole the Asians' drugs, which Ziggy never said to do. Ziggy tells him to divide up the goods and lay low. Pilar asks to be restaurant manager, although she has no experience. She also convinces Tommy to hire Mose, a disabled vet from group therapy. Tommy explains his past with Dion to Pilar: Dion's parents were murdered when he was a child and Tommy's own mother left Aidan when he was a baby. Later, Dion and Mose steal wine from Tommy's former boss, and Dion hires his former kitchen crew. While Patrick visits Ziggy to update him, an Asian prisoner repeatedly stabs Ziggy. Tommy shows Rie's plans for the restaurant to Dion.
4	"Secret Sauce"	Jon S. Baird	Hilly Hicks Jr.	June 21, 2016	0.389
Kevin, Thirio's head chef, puts a strain on everyone there. He even orders Pilar to arrange a health inspection. She seeks help from her sister, Blanca, who ends up hospitalized after a fall. Dion tells her to not worry about business and visit her sister. At the hospital, she surreptitiously meets Patrick, who is visiting his comatose father. He promises her a successful restaurant inspection. Meanwhile, Dion expects something in return from Detective Giordano for supplying information on the Tooth Fairy. This help comes in the form of Kevin getting arrested for hitting Giordano trying to break up a fight with Dion. Aidan's accountant informs him of a scaffolding contract going to a competitor. The income from that contract was supposed to cover his medical expenses and his restaurant investment. Tommy is told by TJ's school counselor that he is making progress, in part from Dion's positive influence. Tommy tells Dion to be more of an uncle and let Tommy be the father.
5	"Gimme a T"	Dan Attias	Marisa Wegrzyn	June 28, 2016	0.299
Tommy and TJ have difficulty dealing with Rie's birthday without her. Tommy snaps at Pilar for not getting a liquor license yet. Despite her claims to know someone who can help, Tommy says he will handle it. TJ gets into a fight with a school bully who makes fun of his drawing of Rie. TJ is suspended, and Tommy is told to expect a visit from child services. At Tommy's urging, Aidan expedites Thirio's liquor license, but receives news that only a bone marrow transplant can treat his relapsed leukemia. He later rewards TJ for winning the fight by allowing him to shoot his gun at a range. Patrick learns one of his own men snitched to the Asians and has him killed. Tommy finds Dion also strangely grieving about Rie. Dion says that he knew her before Tommy did. While looking through old photos, Tommy sees Dion and Rie sharing more than casual glances.
6	"The Wild West"	Dan Attias	Tony Saltzman	July 5, 2016	0.374
With Thirio's soft opening approaching, Tommy searches Rie's laptop for old photos for the press. He finds a file of videos that Dion filmed of Rie cooking. Then, the restaurant's gas supply is shut off after a bill doesn't get paid. Dion cannot con the company to turn it back on. Mose manages to connect the restaurant to the city's main line. He then notices Pilar sorting fake receipts given to her from Dion. She argues with Dion, then has sex with him after failing to seduce Tommy. During the restaurant's opening, Nancy Hinson from Child Protection Services arrives to inspect TJ's living arrangement. She is not happy about the residence being above the restaurant. Aidan assures her that TJ couldn't be in a "more supportive family". Meanwhile, Patrick is warned by the Asians of a coming war. It begins at the restaurant when he gets into a gun battle with armed motorcyclists. The shootout is aired on television with Thirio's marquee prominently framed. Dion deflects Tommy's questions about Patrick. Tommy also cannot shake the thought of Dion and Rie possibly once being intimate.
7	"Tabula Rasa"	Dennie Gordon	Becky Mode	July 12, 2016	0.390
Following the news reports of the shootout, all of Thirio's reservations are canceled. Distracted, Tommy asks if Dion had sex with Rie. Dion says he and Rie were just interacting for the camera and that Habib was present during half of the tapings. Tommy apologizes for being paranoid. Pilar tells them she is meeting with a publicist, hoping a corporate sponsorship will increase business. Tommy instead advises Dion to make amends with Dante DiPaolo, a celebrity chef and Dion's former mentor. Dante initially refuses because Dion previously stole his recipes; however, Dante later arrives and gives a rave review on a live blog. Giordano pulls Dion away to ask his help in killing Patrick, who has left a tooth inside Giordano's home. Dion returns to the restaurant to hear Dante's story of Dion once having sex with a "hot black chick" who was a chef. Tommy locks eyes with Dion.
8	"In Lies the Truth"	Dennie Gordon	Robin Shushan	July 19, 2016	0.419
After getting the cold shoulder from Tommy, Dion visits his uncle Stavros to discuss opening a restaurant with Patrick. Stavros urges him to stick with "family" (Tommy). Later with Dion, Giordano discusses the plan of killing Patrick, as Dion is shown to have recorded the conversation. When Tommy learns that TJ is not in school, he finds him at a sidewalk memorial for Rie and takes him to the cemetery. He asks for a moment alone, only to spit on her grave for having sex with Dion. TJ later sees his bully setting fire to the memorial. Dion and a drunken Tommy have a loud argument on Thirio's opening night. Pilar tells them the customers can hear them, and they fight on the roof. Dion confesses to having sex once with Rie, long ago, but it was a mistake and nothing developed between them. Tommy ends their friendship, keeping it strictly professional. Dion later declines Patrick's offer. After returning from a visit with Aidan, TJ pulls out a gun he stole from him and points it at a picture of his bully.
9	"Be My Baby"	Steve Shill	David Babcock	July 26, 2016	0.337
Dion invites Tommy to a concert, but Tommy steers the conversation towards TJ's paternity, as his birth occurred within a year after Dion had sex with Rie. Dion assures him that TJ is Tommy's son. Still distracted, Tommy seems to not pay much attention to TJ. Patrick visits Dion to announce a change in their agreement that forces Dion to pay a third of what is owed in a week. Dion maintains his loyalty to Tommy, but Patrick predicts that will change. Aidan's declining health forces him to want to kill himself. However, he finds his gun missing and calls Dion. TJ has taken the gun to school. Dion and Tommy arrive at the school to learn that TJ's bully has been arrested. TJ confesses to placing the gun in the bully's locker; Aidan commends his creativity but suggests he still needs punishment. Giordano tries to end his feud with Patrick, who ultimately has him hanged. After giving Dion a second chance, Tommy also decides against testing TJ's paternity.
10	"Fire"	Steve Shill	Clyde Phillips & Tony Saltzman	August 2, 2016	0.406
Patrick leaves Giordano's body hanging, and it is eventually found. Ziggy condemns his son for being so careless, which later causes Patrick to send Ziggy back to prison. Patrick also visits Tommy to mention Dion's debt, which Tommy pretends to know about. Patrick then threatens TJ, and Tommy tells him to leave. Later, Tommy confronts Dion, saying his helping with the restaurant was to pay off a debt and not help Rie's dream become reality. Crying, Dion claims that Patrick threatened everyone Dion is close to, including Tommy and TJ. Tommy later offers Patrick a share in Thirio to pay off Dion's debt, but a disguised Dion and Stavros robs Patrick at a poker game. While Tommy and TJ are at a public viewing of TJ's artwork, someone loosens a gas line at Thirio. TJ's increasing flashbacks of his mother's death allow him to realize that he didn't cause it and it was no accident. However, Thirio erupts in flames as he announces this, and he, Tommy and Dion are trapped inside.

== Production ==
On June 25, 2015, AMC ordered Clyde Phillips for a 10-episode series Broke based on the Danish series Bankerot by Kim Fupz Aakeson, which Phillips would executive produce. AMC Studios, Lionsgate Television, and Clyde Phillips Productions would produce the series. Henrik Ruben Genz and Malene Blenkov, who have previously produced Bankerot, are also executive producers, with Piv Bernt. The show was renamed to Feed the Beast and announced to start production in February 2016 in New York City, for a May 2016 premiere.

On April 28, 2016, it was announced on the artist's official Facebook page that Sasha Dobson would perform the opening theme song for the series.

On September 2, 2016, AMC cancelled the show after one season.

== Reception ==
On Rotten Tomatoes the series has a rating of 23%, based on 39 reviews, with an average rating of 5.1/10. The site's critical consensus reads, "Feed the Beast's visual appeal isn't enough to make up for predictable plotting, convoluted dialogue and unlikable characters." On Metacritic the series has a score of 46 out of 100, based on 33 critics, indicating "mixed or average reviews".
