= Wayward Son (film) =

- Promotional poster
- Directed by: Randall Harris
- Written by: Randall Harris
- Produced by: Cary Brokaw
- Starring: Harry Connick, Jr. Pete Postlethwaite
- Music by: James Newton Howard; Steve Porcaro
- Distributed by: Avenue Pictures; No US distributor
- Release date: September 14, 1999
- Running time: 96 minutes
- Country: United States
- Language: English
- Budget: $7.7 million

Wayward Son is a 1999 American drama film directed by Randall Harris and starring Harry Connick, Jr. and Pete Postlethwaite. The screenplay concerns justice and redemption in rural Georgia during the Great Depression.

== Plot ==
A southern man, Jesse Banks Rhodes (Harry Connick, Jr.), is released from a prison work camp in Louisiana, 1936, after being wrongly imprisoned for eleven years. He heads back to Georgia, only to find that most people are keen to keep him down. He begins working for a plantation owner (Walton Goggins) and rents a shed from a farmer (Pete Postlethwaite) with two daughters (Patricia Clarkson and Vinessa Shaw). After witnessing the murder of a black worker at the hands of a drunken white racist boss, Jesse is forced to prove his innocence, so injustice will not happen again.

== Cast ==
- Harry Connick, Jr. as Jesse Banks Rhodes
- Pete Postlethwaite as Ben Alexander
- Patricia Clarkson as Wesley
- Vinessa Shaw as Cordelia
- Walton Goggins
- Afemo Omilami as Horace
- David Pickens as Warden
- John Bennes as Lawyer
- Stacie Richards Dail as young crying woman
- David de Vries
- Michael Gaston as Edgar
- Rodney L. James as George
- Laura Sametz asMrs. Blessing
- Ron Clinton Smith as Vernon
- Haviland Stillwell as Lila
- Judson Vaughn as station manager
- Tim Ware as foreman

== Settings ==
Production of the film began Oct. 26, 1998 in Nashville. The movie was filmed at various locations in Georgia including Mansfield and the Southeastern Railway Museum.

== Trivia ==
- Wayward Son has in October, 2006, a number of screenings at the Heartland Film Festival.
- As research for his role as Jesse Banks Rhodes, Connick spent two days in solitary at the Louisiana State Penitentiary Angola, even wearing leg irons and handcuffs during his stay.
- Wayward Son was first called Letters From a Wayward Son.
- Patricia Clarkson and Vinessa Shaw's roles as Wesley and Cordelia, had reportedly been designated for Embeth Davidtz and Tara Reid.
- Screened at the Toronto International Film Festival in September 1999.
- Produced by: Cary Brokaw/Avenue Pictures Productions, Maccabee Productions, Steve Tisch Company
- International rights will be licensed by Arthur Kananack & Associates (AKA Movies).
- This movie was delisted at $0 on April 29, 2002 since the stock was wrapped, but had no distribution.
- Letters From A Wayward Son, Wayward Son Productions 1998: Budget $4.5 million.
- An interview where the director Randall Harris discusses the film with Harry Connick Jr., including a few clips from the movie are featured at the Film-Fest: Issue 3 - Toronto DVD.
- Animal Actors supplied talent on horseback, horses, mules, rattlesnakes, bloodhounds, and German shepherds.

== Awards and nominations ==
- Crystal Heart Award 1999, to producer Cary Brokaw. At the Heartland Film Festival.
