= Dina Mousawi =

British actress and television presenter

- Born: 30 November 1978 (age 47); Bradford, West Yorkshire, England
- Occupations: Actress; Television presenter; Co-author
- Years active: 1997–present
- Spouse: Jim Sturgess (m. 2019)
- Children: 2

Dina Mousawi is a British actress, presenter and co-author of Syria Recipes From Home.

== Early life ==
Mousawi was born at Bradford Royal Infirmary in Bradford, West Yorkshire, England, where she lived until she was six weeks old. She spent her early years in Baghdad, Iraq. Mousawi's father is Iraqi and her mother is Ukrainian.

In 1986, when she was eight years old, Mousawi and her family moved back to Bradford to escape the perils of the Iran-Iraq war.

She attended Salt Grammar School in Shipley, Bradford, and trained at Stage 84 in Idle, Bradford. Her professional acting career began at age ten when she took the lead in the ITV series The Prime Minister’s Brain on ITV.

== Career ==
In 2003 she played Nikki in When Amar Met Jay at the West Yorkshire Playhouse.

In 2003 she played Lana in the film Asylum (released on DVD in the USA as The Refuge) directed by Nigel Roffe-Barker. It had its UK premiere at the Bradford Film Festival on the 19 March 2005.

Mousawi has appeared in a host of household TV shows including Coronation Street, Dalziel and Pascoe, Cold Feet, King of Bollywood and T4 Summer Show. She became a presenter of the T4 Summer Show in 2006 after co-winning the ME 4 T4 series, also in 2006 with Michael Blair being the other winner.

== Personal life ==
She is married to actor Jim Sturgess.
