= Jim Sturgess =

English actor and singer-songwriter (born 1978)

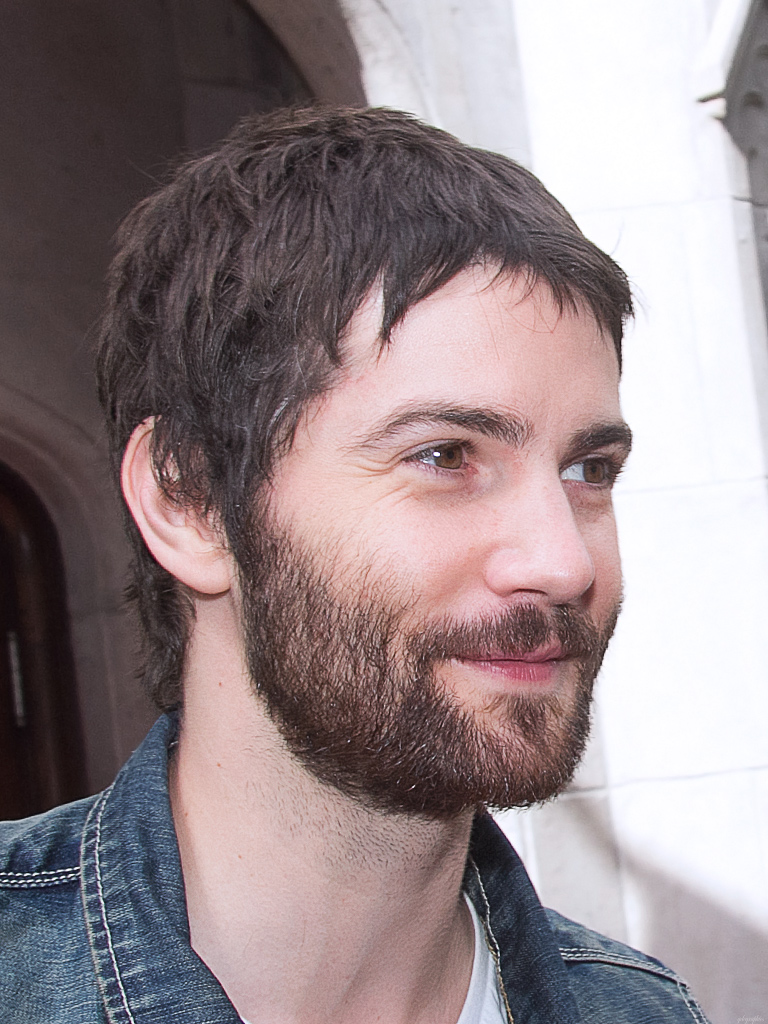
- Sturgess at the 2012 Toronto International Film Festival
- Born: James Anthony Sturgess; 16 May 1978 (age 48); Wandsworth, London, England
- Education: University of Salford
- Occupations: Actor; singer-songwriter
- Years active: 1994–present
- Spouse: Dina Mousawi (m. 2019)
- Children: 2
- Musical career
- Instruments: Vocals; guitar; piano; drums
- Years active: 1996–present

James Anthony Sturgess (born 16 May 1978) is an English actor and singer-songwriter. His first major role was as Jude in the musical romance drama film Across the Universe (2007). He played the male lead role of Ben Campbell in 21 (2008), Gavin Kossef in Crossing Over (2009), The Way Back (2010), and co-starred in the epic science fiction film Cloud Atlas (2012).

Other credits include Stonehearst Asylum (2014), Kidnapping Freddy Heineken and London Fields (both in 2015), Close to the Enemy and Feed the Beast (both in 2016), Geostorm (2017), JT LeRoy (2018), Berlin, I Love You (2019), The Other Me and Alone Together (both in 2022). He also voiced Soren in Legend of the Guardians: The Owls of Ga'Hoole (2010) and starred in One Day (2011) opposite Anne Hathaway.

== Early and personal life ==
Sturgess was born in Wandsworth, London, but grew up in Farnham, Surrey, where he attended Frensham Heights School. He spent most of his youth skateboarding, and listening to hip-hop. He started his first band when he was about 15 years old, playing gigs in and around his local area. His first acting experience came in a local theatre group, after a successful audition for a part in a play.

Sturgess moved to Manchester to attend the University of Salford, graduating in 1999 with an HND in Media and Performance. After graduating, he moved to London and worked in a shop selling trainers, whilst seeking acting work and writing music.

On 30 July 2019, Sturgess married theatre producer Dina Mousawi in Italy. Their son was born in 2020.

== Acting career ==
In 2007, he was cast in Julie Taymor's musical Across the Universe, portraying Jude Feeny, a young man who travels to the US amid the raging throes of the late 1960s and falls in love with a sheltered American teenager, Lucy, played by Evan Rachel Wood. In 2008, he appeared in the historical drama The Other Boleyn Girl, in the supporting role of George Boleyn opposite Natalie Portman, Scarlett Johansson, and Eric Bana. He also played the male lead role of Ben Campbell in a film about five MIT students who, by counting cards, take Las Vegas casinos co-starring Kevin Spacey and Laurence Fishburne, in 21.

In 2009, he played Gavin Kossef in Crossing Over, appearing with Harrison Ford, Ray Liotta, and Ashley Judd. Set in Los Angeles, the story revolves around immigrants from different countries and backgrounds who share a common bond: they are all desperately trying to gain legal-immigrant status. Also in 2009, he starred as Martin McGartland in Kari Skogland's Fifty Dead Men Walking, alongside Ben Kingsley.

Heartless, a film directed by Philip Ridley, premiered on 31 August 2009 at the London FrightFest Film Festival, a popular horror film festival. Sturgess appears as Jamie Morgan, a young man whose life has always been blighted by the large, heart-shaped port wine birthmark on his face and sells his soul to the devil. Sturgess won the Best Actor Award at the 2010 Fantasporto Film Festival for his role.

In 2010, Sturgess starred in the film The Way Back, directed by Peter Weir and based on a true story. The character Sturgess plays is based on Sławomir Rawicz, a young Polish officer who escaped from a Russian gulag during World War II. Also in 2010, he did voice-over work based on the children's book series Guardians of Ga'Hoole by Kathryn Lasky, in which he voiced Soren, the main protagonist of director Zack Snyder's 3D animated feature film Legend of the Guardians: The Owls of Ga'Hoole.

In May 2010, Sturgess signed on to appear in One Day, based on the novel of the same title by David Nicholls) with Anne Hathaway. He played the role of Dexter Mayhew. The novel, about two students who meet on 15 July 1988, follows them on every 15 July for the next 20 years. Directed by Lone Scherfig, filming was completed on 17 September 2010. Also during 2010, he filmed Upside Down. Filming was completed in May 2010 in Montreal, and as of early 2013 a limited international release was planned. Described as a "sci-fi romance", the film is the second full-length feature from writer and director Juan Diego Solanas. It was originally slated for release in 2011, A third film project in 2010 was Promised Land, to be directed by Michael Winterbottom and, according to Variety, would "recount the lead up to the 1948 partition of Palestine and the subsequent creation of the state of Israel". Sturgess was to star as a British officer hunting down the extremist Jewish factions. The film was put on hiatus and later got cancelled because funding could not be secured.

In March and April 2011, filming took place for Ashes, a film directed by Mat Whitecross. The picture has been described as a contemporary film noir thriller starring Ray Winstone and Lesley Manville along with Sturgess. Filmed in the Isle of Man, the production was partially funded by the band Coldplay, university friends of the director. Sturgess performed six roles working alongside Tom Hanks and Halle Berry in the 2012 science fiction film Cloud Atlas.

During 2012, he worked on two films: Giuseppe Tornatore's The Best Offer (original title 'La Migliore Offerta') was filmed during the spring in Prague, Vienna, and several cities in Italy. Co-starring Geoffrey Rush and Sylvia Hoeks, the film went on to win the David di Donatello Award for Best Film. In the autumn, Sturgess went to Los Angeles to film Electric Slide, directed by Tristan Patterson and co-starring Isabel Lucas and Chloë Sevigny. An official selection of the Tribeca Film Festival, it premiered there in 2014 as part of the Viewpoint selections.

In the last half of 2013, Sturgess worked in three films. The first was Stonehearst Asylum, co-starring Kate Beckinsale and directed by Brad Anderson, in the summer. He appeared in the Mathew Cullen-directed London Fields, based on the novel by Martin Amis, co-starring Amber Heard and Billy Bob Thornton. The film premiered at the 2015 Toronto International Film Festival but it was later pulled out because of legal dispute between Cullen and the investors. He portrayed Dutch criminal Cor van Hout in Kidnapping Freddy Heineken, filmed in Belgium and New Orleans, directed by Daniel Alfredson and co-starring Sam Worthington and Anthony Hopkins.

In 2016, he starred as Callum Ferguson in the BBC Two drama Close to the Enemy, alongside Freddie Highmore and Phoebe Fox. The same year he had a main role as Dion Patras, a drug-fuelled chef, alongside David Schwimmer in the television series Feed the Beast. In 2017, he starred as Max Lawson in Geostorm, alongside Ed Harris and Gerard Butler.

Sturgess starred in the 2025 miniseries Mix Tape with Teresa Palmer.

== Music career ==
"Panic & Magic"
Sturgess has written music related to both Crossing Over and Heartless

Sturgess has been writing and performing his own music since the age of 15. He has appeared in the London music scene for many years in bands such as Saint Faith, and Dilated Spies. He has also written music for some of his films, including two tracks that he wrote and performed for Crossing Over, and he collaborated with director Philip Ridley on three tracks that appeared in the film Heartless. Mickey O'Brien, his ex-girlfriend and member of La Roux, was the composer of the trailer track "Panic And Magic" and Sturgess provided the vocals.

In 2016, he released five exclusive demos with his band Tragic Toys, to raise funds for a friend with an aggressive form of multiple sclerosis. The music for these demos were written by O'Brien and Sturgess provided the vocals.

== Filmography ==
=== Film ===
Year	Title	Role	Notes
1994	The Browning Version	Bryant	
2005	Mouth to Mouth	Red	
2007	Across the Universe	Jude Feeny	
2008	The Other Boleyn Girl	George Boleyn	
2008	21	Ben Campbell	
2008	Fifty Dead Men Walking	Martin McGartland	
2009	Crossing Over	Gavin Kossef	
2009	Heartless	Jamie Morgan	
2010	The Way Back	Janusz Wieszczek	
2010	Legend of the Guardians: The Owls of Ga'Hoole	Soren	Voice role
2011	One Day	Dexter Mayhew	
2012	Ashes	James	
2012	Cloud Atlas	Various roles	
2012	Upside Down	Adam Kirk	
2013	The Best Offer	Robert	
2014	Electric Slide	Eddie Dodson	
2014	Stonehearst Asylum	Edward Newgate	
2015	Kidnapping Freddy Heineken	Cor van Hout	
2015	London Fields	Keith Talent	
2017	Geostorm	Max Lawson	
2018	JT LeRoy	Geoffrey Knoop	
2019	Berlin, I Love You	Jared	Segment: "Berlin Ride"
2022	The Other Me	Irakli	
2022	Alone Together	Charlie	
2024	Apartment 7A	Alan Marchand	
2027	4 Kids Walk Into a Bank †	Vernon	Post-production

=== Television ===
Year	Title	Role	Notes
1999	The Scarlet Pimpernel	Erik	2 episodes
2000	Thursday the 12th	Martin Bannister	Television film
2000	Other People's Children	Barry	Episode 1.2
2001	The Residents	Banjo	Episode 1.1
2001	Heartbeat	Robert	Episode: "The Long Weekend"
2001	Hawk	Shop Assistant	Miniseries
2002	The Quest	Young Charlie	Television film
2002	Judge John Deed	Gary Patterson	Episode: "Abuse of Power"
2003	A Touch of Frost	Laurence Burrell	Episode: "Close Encounters"
2003	Rehab	Daryll	Television film
2004	The Second Quest	Young Charlie	Television film
2004	The Final Quest	Young Charlie	Television film
2005	The Last Detective	Ryan	Episode: "Friends Reunited"
2016	Close to the Enemy	Callum Ferguson	Miniseries
2016	Feed the Beast	Dion Patras	Main role
2018	Hard Sun	Charlie Hicks	Main role
2020–2021	Home Before Dark	Matthew Lisko	Main role
2025	Mix Tape	Daniel O'Toole	Miniseries
2025	The Stolen Girl	Fred Bix	Miniseries

== Discography ==
=== Soundtracks ===
Year	Song	Credits / Notes	Film/Soundtrack
2007	"Girl"		Across the Universe
2007	"All My Loving"		Across the Universe
2007	"With A Little Help From My Friends"	(with Joe Anderson)	Across the Universe
2007	"I've Just Seen A Face"		Across the Universe
2007	"Dear Prudence"	(with Joe Anderson, Dana Fuchs & Evan Rachel Wood)	Across the Universe
2007	"Because"	(with Joe Anderson, T. V. Carpio, Dana Fuchs, Martin Luther McCoy & Evan Rachel Wood)	Across the Universe
2007	"Something"		Across the Universe
2007	"Strawberry Fields Forever"	(with Joe Anderson)	Across the Universe
2007	"Revolution"		Across the Universe
2007	"Across the Universe"		Across the Universe
2007	"All You Need Is Love"	(with T. V. Carpio, Dana Fuchs & Martin Luther McCoy)	Across the Universe
2008	"Lost Everything"		21
2009	"Mistake The Enemy"	(Writer and performer)	Crossing Over
2009	"Make Your Mind Up"	(Writer and performer)	Crossing Over
2009	"Hine ma tov"	(Traditional)	Crossing Over
2009	"Heartless"		Heartless
2009	"The Other Me"		Heartless
2009	"Panic and Magic"	(O'Brien/Stoney/Sturgess) [Inspired by the film Heartless]	Heartless

== Awards and nominations ==
Year	Awards	Category	Nominated work	Result	Ref.
2008	Teen Choice Awards	Choice Movie: Male Breakout Star	21 and Across the Universe	Nominated	
2008	Vancouver Film Critics Circle	Best Actor in a Canadian Film	Fifty Dead Men Walking	Nominated	
2009	Seattle International Film Festival	Golden Space Needle Award – Best Actor	Fifty Dead Men Walking	Runner-up	
2009	14th Empire Awards	Empire Award for Best Newcomer	Fifty Dead Men Walking	Nominated	
2010	Fantasporto Film Festival	international Fantasy Film – Best actor	Heartless	Won	
2013	CinEuphoria Awards	Best Supporting Actor – International	Cloud Atlas	Nominated	
2016	National Film Awards UK	Best Breakthrough Performance in a Film	Kidnapping Freddy Heineken	Nominated	

== Notes ==
1.From the soundtrack 21 – Original Motion Picture Score, not to be confused with the film's other soundtrack Music From The Motion Picture 21.

== See also ==
- List of people from London
- List of British actors
- List of singer-songwriters
