= Eddie Dodson =

American bank robber

- Born: Edwin Dodson; December 24, 1948; Shelby, North Carolina, US
- Died: February 21, 2003 (aged 54); UCLA Medical Center
- Other name: New York Yankees Bandit
- Occupation: Antique Shop Owner
- Status: Dead
- Motive: Needed money to support a drug habit.
- Convictions: 1984, 1999
- Criminal charges: Bank robbery
- Penalty: Sentenced to 15 years, Served 10. Sentenced to 120 years, Served 46 months.

Eddie Dodson (December 24, 1948 – February 21, 2003) was known as the New York Yankees Bandit. Before his death he was connected to 72 bank robberies.

== Early life ==
Dodson was born in Shelby, North Carolina, on December 24, 1948. Shortly after he was born his father died, leaving his mother and grandmother to raise him. His mother and grandmother were devout Christians, and they attended church regularly.

Dodson graduated from high school in 1967 and considered himself a hippie. Shortly after graduating he started selling illegal drugs and was eventually arrested in 1972.

== Criminal history ==
Running from a possible conviction from the 1972 drug arrest, Dodson ended up in Los Angeles, where he opened an antique store/nightclub that eventually attracted many Hollywood celebrities. Dodson became a minor Los Angeles celebrity himself. Eventually his lawyer back in North Carolina managed to get his charges dropped. However, Dodson continued his drug use.

In 1983, Dodson was unable to support his drug addiction financially, and he resorted to robbing banks. Within nine months, he had robbed 64 banks, which is the largest number of banks in the US robbed by a single person. His trademark 'NY Yankees' baseball cap led to his nickname. In 1984, Dodson was finally arrested and convicted, and was sentenced to 15 years in prison. However, he only served 10 years.

When Dodson was released, he worked for a time as a caretaker for actor and director Jack Nicholson, but in time resumed his former drug use. One of his friends tried to help him get into rehabilitation, but he failed. In 1999, Dodson robbed eight more banks, which led to a conviction, and he was facing a penalty of 120 years. However, due to his diagnosis of Hepatitis C, the courts sentenced him to only 46 months (6 of those months on a drug charge), because they did not think he had much longer to live. In 2003, Dodson died at UCLA Medical Center.

== In popular culture ==
In April 2015 the biographical crime film Electric Slide was released, starring Jim Sturgess as Eddie Dodson. The film is based on a Gear magazine article written by Timothy Ford, The Yankee Bandit: The Life and Times of Eddie Dodson, World’s Great Bank Robber. The events of the film are based loosely on Dodson's string of robberies between 1983 and 1984.
