= Bathhouse Betty =

Studio album by Bette Midler
- Released: September 15, 1998
- Recorded: 1997–98
- Studios: Complex Studios (Los Angeles, CA); Right Track Recording (New York, NY); Unique Recording Studios (New York, NY); Westwind Media (Burbank, CA)
- Genre: Pop
- Length: 44:58; 48:27 (Japan)
- Label: Warner Bros.
- Producers: Arif Mardin, David Foster, Ted Templeman, Brock Walsh, Marc Shaiman, Chuckii Booker

Bette Midler chronology
Bette of Roses (1995)	Bathhouse Betty (1998)	Bette (2000)

Singles from Bathhouse Betty
- 1. "That's How Love Moves"; 2. "My One True Friend"; 3. "I'm Beautiful"

Bathhouse Betty is the ninth studio album by the American singer Bette Midler, released in 1998. Bathhouse Betty was Midler's debut album for Warner Bros. Records, after having parted ways with sister label Atlantic Records in 1995 following the moderate commercial success of her later-platinum certified album Bette of Roses. Bathhouse Betty was certified Gold by the RIAA and spawned the Billboard Dance Club chart topper "I'm Beautiful".

== Background and production ==
The title of the album, Bathhouse Betty, refers to Midler's early career when she performed her cabaret shows at gay bathhouses like the Continental Baths in New York which led to her becoming a gay icon with a loyal LGBT following ever since. When Midler promoted the album she said in an interview, "Despite the way things turned out [with the AIDS crisis], I'm still proud of those days [when I got my start singing at the gay bathhouses]. I feel like I was at the forefront of the gay liberation movement, and I hope I did my part to help it move forward. So, I kind of wear the label of 'Bathhouse Betty' with pride."

Released some twenty-five years after Midler's breakthrough with the album The Divine Miss M, Bathhouse Betty was musically a comeback and a return to her roots and her high camp Mae-West-meets-the-Andrews-Sisters stage persona of the same name. The second single "I'm Beautiful"— a remake of a song by house music group Uncanny Alliance - opens with the spoken line, "This is the Divine Miss M and I'm here to share with you some rare and stimulating insight about my cosmic fabulosity!" and effectively set the tone for the following album.

"Ukulele Lady", a tribute to Midler's native Hawaii which she had first performed live in the 1997 TV special Diva Las Vegas, is an old evergreen written by Gus Kahn and Richard A. Whiting, published in 1925 and first made famous by Vaughn De Leath—and later recorded by among others Miss Piggy on The Muppet Show. Other songs on Bathhouse Betty include early girl group classics like Patti LaBelle and the Bluebelles' debut single "I Sold My Heart to the Junkman" and 1950's R&B chanteuse Big Maybelle's "One Monkey Don't Stop No Show", the latter featuring swing-rock band Royal Crown Revue. Contemporary covers include Ben Folds' tragicomic "Boxing", an imagined monologue by Muhammad Ali, originally featured on Ben Folds Five's 1995 self-titled debut album, Dave Frishberg's "I'm Hip" and Dick Gallagher and Mark Waldrop's "Laughing Matters", taken from Howard Crabtree's 1996 gay musical revue When Pigs Fly. "Big Socks", an original written and produced by Chuckii Booker, is a tongue-in-cheek contemporary R&B track whose lyrics debate the supposed correlation between the size of men's feet and other body parts; "Don't brag about your body, baby, and say that you're packin' a lot, 'cause all I see besides your big feet is that you got big socks."

Bathhouse Betty was not all campiness and laughs; the album opens with the ballad "Song of Bernadette" written by Leonard Cohen, Bill Elliott and Jennifer Warnes, and first recorded by Warnes on her 1987 album Famous Blue Raincoat. The title and the lyrics of the song refer to Bernadette Soubirous, a young French girl in the mid-19th century who claimed to have seen the Virgin Mary on several occasions. Bernadette was subsequently declared insane by the villagers of Lourdes, but canonized by the Catholic Church and proclaimed Saint Bernadette after her death. "Lullaby in Blue", which Midler described as her personal favourite on the album, was co-written by Leonard Cohen's son Adam and is a song about a woman who gave up a child for adoption: "I've never heard a pop song about a person who gives their child up and is missing the child... The first time I heard that song, I burst into tears." The first single released from the album was the melancholy "My One True Friend", composed by David Foster, Carole King and Carole Bayer Sager and the lead song from the movie One True Thing which starred Meryl Streep and William Hurt.

One track from the Bathhouse Betty sessions, Julie Gold's "Heaven", was only released as a single B-side and featured as a bonus track on the Japanese edition of the album. Gold had previously written Midler's 1990 hit single "From a Distance".

== Critical reception ==
Professional ratings
Review scores
Source	Rating
AllMusic	2/5 stars
Robert Christgau	(1-star Honorable Mention)
The Rolling Stone Album Guide	2.5/5 stars

The album received mixed reviews from music critics. Michael Gallucci from AllMusic website gave the album two out of five stars and wrote that it "tries to be all things to all Bette Midler fans" including "high camp for her loyal, and early, drag cult", "straight-up covers of big-league songwriters, both veteran and modern" and "big, bad ballads for the people who made her a moderately successful Top 40 and box office draw". According to him it lacks personality and is "almost like looking at a photo album filled with vaguely familiar faces, none of which you really know that well." Robert Christgau gave the album one star and chose "I'm Beautiful" and "Lullabye in Blue" as the best moments of the album.

== Commercial performance ==
Bathhouse Betty reached number 32 on the Billboard 200; "My One True Friend" reached number 16 on the Adult Contemporary chart. "I'm Beautiful", which featured dance remixes by among others Victor Calderone, Danny Tenaglia and composer Brinsley Evans himself, was a major dance-floor hit, becoming a number 1 on the Hot Dance Club Play chart and number 8 on Hot Dance Music/Maxi Singles Sales.

== Track listing ==
No.	Title	Writer(s)	Producer	Length
1.	"Song of Bernadette" (originally recorded by Jennifer Warnes)	Leonard Cohen, Bill Elliott, Jennifer Warnes	Ted Templeman	3:46
2.	"I'm Beautiful" (originally recorded by Uncanny Alliance)	Brinsley Evans	Arif Mardin	3:55
3.	"Lullaby in Blue"	Adam Cohen, Brock Walsh	Brock Walsh	5:09
4.	"Ukulele Lady" (originally recorded by Vaughn De Leath)	Gus Kahn, Richard Whiting	Mardin	3:34
5.	"I'm Hip" (originally recorded by Dave Frishberg)	Bob Dorough, Dave Frishberg	Marc Shaiman	2:44
6.	"I Sold My Heart to the Junkman" (originally recorded by The Basin Street Boys)	Leon René, Otis René	Mardin	3:10
7.	"One Monkey Don't Stop No Show" (originally recorded by Big Maybelle)	Rose Marie McCoy, Charlie Singleton	Templeman	2:46
8.	"Boxing" (originally recorded by Ben Folds Five)	Ben Folds	Templeman	4:26
9.	"Big Socks"	Chuckii Booker	Chuckii Booker	3:51
10.	"That's How Love Moves"	Jennifer Kimball, Ty Lacy, Fitzgerald Scott	Mardin	3:54
11.	"My One True Friend" (from the motion picture One True Thing)	David Foster, Carole King, Carole Bayer Sager	David Foster	3:49
12.	"Laughing Matters" (originally from the musical When Pigs Fly)	Dick Gallagher, Mark Waldrop	Shaiman	3:54
13.	"Heaven" (Japan bonus track; originally recorded by Nanci Griffith)	Julie Gold	Shaiman	3:29

== Personnel ==
- Bette Midler – lead vocals, background vocals
- Katreese Barnes – background vocals
- Margaret Dorn – background vocals
- Petra Haden – background vocals
- Ula Hedwig – background vocals
- Natalie Jackson – background vocals
- Johnny Kemp – background vocals
- Ivan Matias – background vocals
- Michelle Matlock – background vocals
- Eddie Nichols – background vocals
- Chuckii Booker – background vocals, multi instruments
- Gregg Bissonette – drums
- Daniel Glass – drums
- Rick Marotta – drums
- Lewis Nash – drums
- John Robinson – drums
- Steve Schaeffer – drums
- Frank Pagano – percussion
- Emil Richards – percussion
- Richard Crooks – spoons
- Jerry Barnes – bass guitar, background vocals
- Matt Bissonette – bass
- Nathan East – bass
- Veikko Lepisto – bass
- Ron Carter – upright bass
- Chuck Domanico – acoustic bass
- James Achor – guitar
- Dennis Budimir – guitar
- Tim Pierce – guitar
- Michael Thompson – guitar
- Ira Siegel – guitar, pedal steel
- Jay Berliner – ukulele
- Eric Weissberg – ukulele
- Brock Walsh – banjo
- Robbie Kondor – mandolin
- Dean Parks – dulcimer, acoustic guitar, mandolin, balalaika, electric guitar
- Cyrus Chestnut – piano
- Greg Hilfman – piano
- Carole King – piano
- Randy Waldman – piano
- Kim Bullard – keyboards
- David Foster – keyboards
- Randy Kerber – keyboards
- John Philip Shenale – keyboards
- Steve Skinner – organ, keyboards
- Warren Luening – trumpet
- Jack Sheldon – trumpet
- Scott Steen – trumpet
- Bob Efford – saxophone
- Richard Mitchell – saxophone
- Roger Neumann – saxophone
- Mando Dorame – tenor saxophone
- Bill Ungerman – baritone saxophone
- Les Benedict – trombone
- James Self – tuba
- Richard Todd – French horn

== Production ==
- Arif Mardin – record producer, musical arranger
- Marc Shaiman – producer, arranger
- David Foster – producer, arranger
- Ted Templeman – producer
- Chuckii Booker – producer, arranger, engineer
- Brock Walsh – producer, arranger
- Michael O'Reilly – producer, engineer
- Carole King – arranger
- Steve Skinner – arranger
- Bill Schneider – arranger
- Bill Ungerman – arranger
- Brad Dechter – arranger
- Kim Bullard – arranger
- Claus Trelby – engineer
- Jason Mauza – engineer
- Rod Michaels – engineer
- Alejandro Rodriguez – engineer
- Al Schmitt – engineer
- Lee Herschberg – engineer
- Andy Grassi – engineer
- Steve Griffen – engineer
- Humberto Gatica – engineer
- Felipe Elgueta – engineer
- Cary Butler – engineer
- Jeff Hendrickson – engineer, mixing
- Kevin Clark – engineer, mixing
- Dana Jon Chappelle – engineer, mixing
- David Koenig – mixing
- Frank Filipetti – mixing
- Gloria Gabriel – production manager
- Nick Vidar – production assistant
- Dave DePalo – production assistant

== Charts ==
Chart performance for Bathhouse Betty
Chart (1998)	Peak position
Australian Albums (ARIA)	55
Canada Top Albums/CDs (RPM)	88
German Albums (Offizielle Top 100)	68
Japanese Albums (Oricon)	89
US Billboard 200	32

== Certifications and sales ==
Region	Certification	Certified units/sales
United States (RIAA)	Gold	500,000^{^}
^{^} Shipments figures based on certification alone.
