= List of New York Undercover episodes =

This is a complete list of episodes of the American police drama New York Undercover, which originally aired on the Fox network from September 8, 1994, to June 25, 1998, through 4 seasons with 89 episodes produced. The episode number reflects the order in which they were aired, which sometimes differed from the order of filming.

== Series overview ==
Season	Episodes	Originally released	
Season	Episodes	First released	Last released
1	26	September 8, 1994	May 11, 1995
2	26	August 31, 1995	May 9, 1996
3	24	August 29, 1996	May 15, 1997
4	13	January 8, 1998	June 25, 1998

== Episodes ==
Throughout the first three seasons, episodes regularly featured musical guests performing at Natalie's, a nightclub whose original owner was portrayed by Gladys Knight in Season 1.

=== Season 1 (1994–95) ===
No. overall	No. in season	Title	Directed by	Written by	Musical guest and song	Original release date	Prod. code	U.S. viewers (millions)
1	1	"School Ties"	Arthur W. Forney	Natalie Chaidez	Teddy Pendergrass "Close the Door"	September 8, 1994	70103	12.4
Kids working for an auto-theft ring steal the car of a mobster's mother; J.C.'s ex-girlfriend wants to send G to a private school; guests Clarence Williams and Gladys Knight. Featured opening song: Lost Boyz - "Straight From Da Ghetto" Other featured songs: Us3 - "Cantaloop (Flip Fantasia)", John Coltrane and Johnny Hartman - "My One and Only Love", Queen Latifah - "Just Another Day...", Mary J. Blige - "Sweet Thing", Gang Starr - "Code of the Streets", Mary J. Blige - "Love No Limit"
2	2	"Pilot"	Bill Duke	Story by : Dick Wolf & Kevin Arkadie; Teleplay by : Kevin Arkadie	Gladys Knight (as Natalie) "Good Morning Heartache"	September 15, 1994	83582	9.5
Harlem police detectives J.C. Williams and Eddie Torres have to determine the truthfulness of a young woman's claim that she was raped by four football stars from a rival school. Guest Star: Paula Garcés Featured opening songs: LL Cool J - "Around the Way Girl", Lalah Hathaway - "Let Me Love You", Teddy Pendergrass - "Close the Door" Other featured songs: Ray Contreras - "Cuando Las Cosas Cambiaran", Fernando Echavarria - "Tu Me Revuelves La Piel"
3	3	"Sins of the Father"	Arthur W. Forney	Kevin Arkadie	The O'Jays "For the Love of Money"	September 22, 1994	70101	11.1
A tip from J.C.'s son leads the detectives to a father/son drug ring at the boy's private school; guests the O'Jays. Featured opening song: Black Sheep - "The Choice Is Yours (Revisited)" Other featured songs: Seal - "Bring It On", Mad Lion - "Take It Easy"
4	4	"To Protect and Serve"	Frederick K. Keller	Charles D. Holland	Nancy Wilson "Love Won't Let Me Wait"	September 29, 1994	70106	11.2
The detectives look for clues in a collegian's murder; J.C.'s ex-wife is involved with a musician in Nancy Wilson's band. Featured opening song: Craig Mack - "Flava in Ya Ear" Other featured songs: Cindy Mizelle - "I've Had Enough", Keith Sweat (featuring Kut Klose) - "Get Up on It", Souls of Mischief - "93 'til Infinity", Brandy - "I Wanna Be Down", Mary J. Blige - "Real Love"
5	5	"Garbage"	Gus Trikonis	Charles D. Holland	Bobby Womack "If You Think You're Lonely Now"	October 6, 1994	70104	11.3
J.C. and Eddie pose as garbage men to probe an employee's death and wind up disposing of hazardous waste. Guest star: Jeffrey Wright Featured opening song: Coolio - "Fantastic Voyage" Other featured songs: Public Enemy - "Give It Up, R. Kelly - "It Seems Like You're Ready", Patra - "Worker Man", Joi - "Sunshine & the Rain", Spice 1 - "Trigga Gots No Heart", Toni Braxton - "You Mean the World to Me"
6	6	"After Shakespeare"	Bill Corcoran	Nonny de la Peña & Angel Dean Lopez	Gladys Knight (as Natalie) "I Don't Want to Know"	October 13, 1994	70105	11.7
A real-estate developer is suspected of fueling gang tensions to lower property values; Eddie tries to repair his relationship with his dad. Featured opening song: Billy Lawrence - "Forgive Me Baby" Other featured songs: Black Moon - "Buck Em Down", 69 Boyz - "Tootsee Roll"
7	7	"Tasha"	Jace Alexander	Reggie Rock Bythewood	Billy Paul "Me and Mrs. Jones"	October 27, 1994	70108	12.8
An infant's doctor is suspiciously murdered while J.C. and Eddie are investigating a baby's emergency room death. Featured opening song: Public Enemy - "911 Is a Joke" Other featured songs: Jeru the Damaja - "Come Clean", Meshell Ndegeocello - "Step into the Projects"
8	8	"Missing"	Anthony Hickox	Natalie Chaidez	Stephanie Mills "What Cha Gonna Do with My Lovin'"	November 3, 1994	70107	11.4
J.C. and Eddie search for suspects in an underworld of child molesters when the young son of a city council candidate is kidnapped in Central Park. Featured opening song: Zhané - "Vibe" Other featured songs: Aaron Hall - "Until the End of Time", Changing Faces - "Foolin' Around"
9	9	"The Friendly Neighborhood Dealer"	Reynaldo Villalobos	Reggie Rock Bythewood	Boyz II Men "On Bended Knee"	November 10, 1994	70102	11.4
J.C. and Eddie investigate a local youth center when children start overdosing on a powerful type of heroin; G enrolls in a basketball clinic. Featured opening song: Brand Nubian - "Word Is Bond" Other featured song: O.C. - "Time's Up"
10	10	"Mate"	Oz Scott	Kevin Arkadie	Keith Sweat "When I Give My Love"	November 17, 1994	70109	12.4
The detectives pose as a pair of pornographers to locate a missing girl before she falls victim to drugs and murder; guest Keith Sweat. Featured opening song: Salt-N-Pepa - "None of Your Business" Other featured song: Brandy - "Best Friend"
11	11	"Eyewitness Blues"	Frederick K. Keller	Charles D. Holland	Salli Richardson (as Tami Barrett) "Sensuality"	November 24, 1994	70110	11.0
J.C. goes under cover as a bodyguard to protect a famous pop singer who witnessed her manager's murder. Other featured songs: Karyn White - "Hungah", Jade - "5-4-3-2 (Yo! Time Is Up)", Tevin Campbell -"Always in My Heart"
12	12	"Blondes Have More Fun"	Helaine Head	Story by : Kevin Arkadie; Teleplay by : Kevin Arkadie & Robert Ward	Mavis Staples "I'll Take You There"	December 8, 1994	70114	11.6
J.C. and Eddie pose as drag queens to investigate the murder of a popular transvestite; Sandy is offered a job in London. Featured opening song: Uncanny Alliance - "I'm Beautiful Dammitt!" Other featured songs: Cheryl Lynn - "Got to Be Real", Gloria Gaynor - "I Will Survive", Peaches & Herb - "Shake Your Groove Thing"
13	13	"Los Macheteros"	Michael Lange	Natalie Chaidez	India "Ese Hombre"	December 15, 1994	70111	9.0
Eddie infiltrates a Puerto Rican terrorist group to probe an armored-car robbery and winds up sympathizing with their cause. Other featured song: Frankie Cutlass (featuring Ray Boogie) - "Puerto Rico"
14	14	"Private Enemy No. 1"	Frederick K. Keller	Nonny de la Peña & Angel Dean Lopez	Mary J. Blige "I'm Goin' Down"	January 5, 1995	70113	12.3
J.C. thinks an old gang rival murdered a '60s activist; Eddie's journalist sister joins the guys on their rounds. Featured opening song: Gil Scott-Heron - "The Revolution Will Not Be Televised" Other featured song: Scarface - "I Seen a Man Die"
15	15	"The Smoking Section"	Mick Garris	Reggie Rock Bythewood	Gerald Levert - "A Song for You"; Rev. Timothy Wright and the New York Fellowship Mass Choir - "We Need A Miracle" and "Trouble Don't Last Always"	January 19, 1995	70112	13.5
A minister (Howard Rollins) fights a cigarette company's attempts to recruit new smokers in his community. Featured opening song: Sounds of Blackness - "Everything Is Gonna Be Alright" (Brian Morgan Remix)
16	16	"Mama Said Knock You Out"	Mike Vejar	Natalie Chaidez	Zhané "Free"	February 2, 1995	70116	13.9
Eddie and J.C. go under cover as a boxer and a manager to find the dealer of a new drug that killed a young boxer. Featured opening song: Method Man - "Bring the Pain" Other featured song: Channel Live - "Mad Izm"
17	17	"You Get No Respect"	James A. Contner	Story by : Reggie Rock Bythewood & Robert Ward; Teleplay by : Reggie Rock Bythewood	The Notorious B.I.G. "Juicy"	February 9, 1995	70120	13.2
J.C. and Eddie enter a world of drugs, gangsters and deception in search of clues to a rap artist's murder. Guest Stars: Sticky Fingaz, Treach & Yo Yo. Featured opening song: Sticky Fingaz (as Khalil) - "You Get No Respect" Other featured song: Funkmaster Flex (featuring The Ghetto Celebs (Charlie Brown, Ol' Dirty Bastard, Biz Markie) - "Nuttin' But Flavour"
18	18	"Innocent Bystander"	Jace Alexander	Terry Curtis Fox	SWV "There'll Never Be"	February 16, 1995	70117	12.1
J.C.'s (Malik Yoba) son, G (George Gore II), becomes a target after he witnesses a mob killing. With Michael DeLorenzo, Patti D'Arbanville-Quinn and Fatima Faloye. Featured opening song: Ice Cube - "What Can I Do?" (Remix)
19	19	"CAT"	Reynaldo Villalobos	Michael R. Perry & Stephen Gaghan	Brian McKnight "All I Do"	February 23, 1995	70119	12.3
Working under cover, Eddie uses his chemistry knowledge in an attempt to bust a drug lord's operation of manufacturing a dangerous new drug. Guest Star: Ice T. Featured opening song: TLC - "Creep" Other featured song: 69 Boyz - "Kitty Kitty"
20	20	"All in the Family"	Jace Alexander	Charles D. Holland & Robert Ward	James Brown "It's a Man's Man's Man's World"	March 16, 1995	70115	11.4
The partners pose as black-market weapons buyers to nab a family of gun thieves; Eddie's dad blows his chance to play saxophone for James Brown. Featured opening song: Montell Jordan - "This Is How We Do It"
21	21	"Eliminate the Middleman"	Michael Scott	Natalie Chaidez	Teena Marie "Wishing on a Star"	March 30, 1995	70125	11.3
A difficult situation arises when Eddie and J.C. discover the middleman for a drug operation is a friend of Eddie's father. Guest Star: Ben Vereen Other featured song: Adina Howard - "Freak Like Me"
22	22	"Olde Tyme Religion"	William Malone	Story by : Kevin Arkadie & Robert Ward; Teleplay by : Kevin Arkadie	Chanté Moore "Inside My Love"	April 6, 1995	70121	9.9
Eddie goes undercover to investigate a murder linked to a bizarre Caribbean religion and winds up seeing visions of his own death. Special Guest stars: Lauren Velez (who would join the cast the next season as Nina Moreno) & Ving Rhames. Featured opening song: Chaka Demus & Pliers - "Murder She Wrote" Other featured song: River Ocean (featuring India) – "Love & Happiness (Yemaya Y Ochun)"
23	23	"The Shooter"	Bill Corcoran	Charles D. Holland	Christopher Williams "Love Ballad"	April 13, 1995	70122	10.3
The partners investigate a sharp-shooter's vendetta against his former accomplices in a financial scam; J.C. learns Sandy is pregnant. Featured opening song: Miss Jones - "Where I Wanna Be Boy" Other featured song: Brownstone - "If You Love Me"
24	24	"Manchild"	Frederick K. Keller	Story by : Natalie Chaidez & Reggie Rock Bythewood; Teleplay by : Larry Moskowitz	Intro "What's Going On"	April 27, 1995	70128	10.4
G must decide if he is "man enough" to protect a friend, a 10-year-old boy involved in a gang-related shooting. Featured opening song: Grandmaster Flash and the Furious Five - "The Message" Other featured song: 2Pac - "Dear Mama"
25	25	"Downtown Girl"	Don Kurt	Larry Moskowitz	Jon Secada "Where Do I Go From You"	May 4, 1995	70129	10.8
The investigation of a high-powered female attorney's death leads Eddie and J.C. to a prominent law firm's money-laundering scheme. Featured opening song: Massive Attack - "Safe From Harm"
26	26	"Catman Comes Back"	Frederick K. Keller	Natalie Chaidez	Montell Jordan "What You Won't Do for Love"	May 11, 1995	70127	13.3
A murder case hits J.C. and Eddie close to home when a drug lord (Ice-T) takes vengeance to a personal level. Note: Last Episode to feature Michael Michele as Sandra "Sandy" Gill in a recurring role. Featured opening song: James Brown - "The Payback"

=== Season 2 (1995–96) ===
No. overall	No. in season	Title	Directed by	Written by	Musical guest and song	Original release date	Prod. code	U.S. viewers (millions)
27	1	"High on the Hog"	Frederick K. Keller	Larry Moskowitz	Al Jarreau "We're in This Love Together"	August 31, 1995	K0503	12.7
Eddie and his new partner Nina Moreno (Lauren Velez) pose as bikers to solve a double homicide; J.C. awaits approval to return to active duty. Featured opening song: Living Colour - "Cult of Personality" Other featured song: Beenie Man (featuring Barrington Levy) - "Murderer" Guest Stars: Henry Simmons, Debra Wilson & Scott Lawrence
28	2	"Tag, You're Dead"	Jace Alexander	Steven Phillip Smith	Mary J. Blige "(You Make Me Feel Like) A Natural Woman"	September 7, 1995	K0507	10.3
Torres and Williams investigate the case of a Wall Street bond salesman who claims to have shot two graffiti artists in self-defense. Featured Opening Song: TLC (featuring André 3000 of Outkast) - "Sumthin' Wicked This Way Comes"
29	3	"Man's Best Friend"	Frederick K. Keller	Natalie Chaidez	Guy "Tell Me What You Like"	September 14, 1995	K0504	11.9
A man gets killed by a pit bull which causes Torres and Williams to go into a world of dog betting. Featured Opening Song: George Clinton - "Atomic Dog" Other featured song: Da Brat - "Fa All Y'all"
30	4	"Brotherhood"	James Charleston	Story by : E. Monique Floyd, Ayanna N. Floyd & Reggie Rock Bythewood; Teleplay by : Reggie Rock Bythewood	Chaka Khan "Sweet Thing"	September 21, 1995	K0506	12.2
J.C. goes under cover in a black fraternity to investigate a racially motivated killing on a college campus. Featured opening songs: Joi - "Stand", "Freedom" Other featured songs: Lost Boyz - "Jeeps, Lex Coups, Bimaz & Benz", The Notorious B.I.G. - One More Chance
31	5	"Digital Underground"	Frederick K. Keller	Shane Salerno	Brandy and Tevin Campbell "The Closer I Get to You"	September 28, 1995	K0508	12.4
The detectives search for Lt. Cooper's missing daughter because of a pedophile she met through her email. Featured Opening Song: Soul for Real - "Every Little Thing I Do" Other featured song: Xscape - "Feels So Good
32	6	"Buster and Claudia"	Don Kurt	Michael Mahern	B.B. King "The Thrill Is Gone"	October 5, 1995	K0510	11.7
A string of robberies leads to an ex-con and his girlfriend; Torres tries to settle a dispute between his father and a mobster. Featured Opening Song: Yo-Yo (featuring Ice Cube) - "The Bonnie and Clyde Theme" Other featured song: Method Man (featuring Mary J. Blige) - "I'll Be There for You/You're All I Need to Get By" Guest Stars: Giancarlo Esposito, Terrence Howard & Aunjanue Ellis
33	7	"Student Affairs"	Michael Lange	Larry Moskowitz	Jon B. "My Cherie Amour"	October 12, 1995	K0511	10.8
The detectives go under cover at a Harlem high school to find a student's murderer; Torres begins to take painkillers after being beaten by Adolfo and his henchmen. Featured Opening Song: The Pharcyde - "Runnin'" Guest Stars: Eartha Kitt, Fredro Starr, Augustin Rodriguez & Naomi Campbell
34	8	"The Highest Bidder"	Frederick K. Keller	Judith McCreary	D'Angelo "Brown Sugar"	October 19, 1995	K0513	10.9
Detective Moreno poses as a nurse after a mother's newborn baby is abducted. Featured opening song: Dionne Farris - "I Know" Other featured song: Faith Evans - "You Used to Love Me"
35	9	"Young, Beautiful and Dead"	Michael Lange	Natalie Chaidez	Silk "Wildflower"	November 2, 1995	K0512	10.6
J.C. poses as a male model to investigate the face-slashing of a teen covergirl; Eddie's painkiller addiction grows. Featured Opening Song: Supercat - "GirlsTown" Other featured song: Chante Moore - Free/Sail On (Our Club Mix) Guest Star: Naomi Campbell Cameo appearances: Patrick Ewing (as himself), Hubert Davis (as himself), Derek Harper (as himself)
36	10	"Color Lines"	Frederick K. Keller	Shane Salerno	Marnell Kenan "Run to You"	November 9, 1995	K0514	9.7
The Affirmative Action debate causes a serial bomber to kill a congressman; Eddie and Nina began to get close while working on the case. Featured Opening Song: Paris - "Guerrilla Funk"
37	11	"The Finals"	Don Kurt	Reggie Rock Bythewood	Al Green "Love and Happiness"	November 16, 1995	K0515	11.8
Danny Cort comes back with an agenda against Williams; Simone's ulterior motives are exposed. Featured Opening Song: James Brown - "Papa Don't Take No Mess" Other featured song: Tha Dogg Pound - "Respect" Guest Stars: Ice T & Naomi Campbell
38	12	"Internal Affairs"	Melanie Mayron	Larry Moskowitz	George Clinton and the P-Funk All Stars "(Not Just) Knee Deep"	November 30, 1995	K0516	11.2
Williams is probed by the internal affairs division following Danny Cort's death; Torres and Moreno contradict Simone's testimony. Featured Opening Song: Coolio - "Gangsters Paradise" Other featured song: The Temptations - "Papa Was A Rolling Stone"
39	13	"Bad Girls"	Peter R. McIntosh	Michael Mahern	Dionne Farris "Food for Thought"	December 14, 1995	K0517	10.5
Moreno poses as a prostitute to track down a serial killer; J.C. wants G (George Gore II) to come live with him. Featured opening song: Dionne Farris - "Passion"
40	14	"A Time to Kill"	Frederick K. Keller	Judith McCreary	Monifah "I Miss You (Come Back Home)"	January 4, 1996	K0519	10.9
The detectives are caught in the middle when violence erupts between the police and a powerful gang after cop killer's acquittal. Featured Opening Song: Los Lobos - "Just A Man" Other featured song: Curtis Mayfield - "Little Child Running Wild"
41	15	"Bad Blood"	Matthew Penn	Reggie Rock Bythewood & Jamal Joseph	Brownstone "Don't Ask My Neighbors"	January 18, 1996	K0501	10.3
J.C. and Eddie investigate the murder of a freelance writer; Nina gets a surprise visit by her missing husband. Featured opening song: Sweet Honey In The Rock – "Ballad Of The Broken Word" Other featured song: Club Nouveau – "Lean On Me"
42	16	"Fire Show"	Jace Alexander	Natalie Chaidez	Tito Nieves "Lo Prometido Es Deuda"	February 1, 1996	K0518	10.0
Moreno goes under cover as a firefighter in order to find out who's responsible for a female firefighter's death. Featured opening song: TLC - "His Story" Other featured song: Salt-N-Pepa – "Ain't Nuthin' But a She Thing"
43	17	"Toy Soldiers"	Melanie Mayron	Larry Moskowitz	Luther Vandross "A House Is Not a Home"	February 8, 1996	K0502	10.0
The detectives discover that three Rwandan refugees were the assassins in two mob-related cases. Featured opening song: Capleton featuring Method Man - "Wings of the Morning" Other featured song: Goodie Mob – "Cell Therapy"
44	18	"Sympathy for the Devil"	Martha Mitchell	Shane Salerno	Xscape "All This Love"	February 15, 1996	K0520	11.1
Three young robbers are suspects in a pregnant woman's death; However, one of them insists that while they robbed the couple, none of them fired the gun. Featured opening song: Boyz II Men - "U Know" Other featured song: Nonchalant - "5 O'Clock"
45	19	"Checkmate"	Oscar L. Costo	Judith McCreary	Roberta Flack "Killing Me Softly with His Song"	February 22, 1996	K0521	9.7
The detectives' investigation into a mob hit uncovers a female assassin in the midst of a deadly double cross. Featured opening song: Groove Theory - "Tell Me" (Cleve's 122 Reasons To Kick Dub)
46	20	"Unis"	Arthur W. Forney	Story by : Dick Wolf & Steven Phillip Smith; Teleplay by : Steven Phillip Smith	The Barrio Boyzz "A Love of Your Own"	March 7, 1996	K0522	10.9
Lt. Cooper sends two patrol officers to infiltrate a group of corrupt cops when neighborhood dealers start disappearing. Featured opening song: Melle Mel - "White Lines (Don't Don't Do It)" Other featured song: Ziggy Marley and the Melody Makers - "Water and Oil"
47	21	"The Reckoning"	Jesús Treviño	Judith McCreary	Aaron Neville "Use Me"	March 14, 1996	K0509	10.9
The detectives try to prevent an ethnic war between Muslims and Jews when a controversial Muslim leader is murdered. Featured opening song: Marvin Gaye - "Inner City Blues (Make Me Wanna Holler)" Other featured song: The Last Poets – "Black Rage"
48	22	"The Enforcers"	Matthew Penn	Michael Mahern	Koko Taylor "Wang Dang Doodle"	April 4, 1996	K0523	10.9
The detectives look for evidence necessary to book three wealthy students for the murder of G's tutor at Woodbridge academy. Featured opening song: En Vogue - "Free Your Mind" Other featured song: Onyx - "Slam"
49	23	"Andre's Choice"	Bill Corcoran	Suzanne O'Malley	Eddie Levert and Gerald Levert "You Got Your Hooks in Me"	April 11, 1996	K0524	10.0
A fight promoter's death leads to a case involving blackmail, murder and an ex-con whom J.C. has helped. Featured opening song: Public Enemy - "Fight the Power" Other featured song: Groove Theory - "Boy at the Window"
50	24	"No Greater Love"	Melanie Mayron	Natalie Chaidez	Ashford & Simpson "It Seems to Hang On"	April 25, 1996	K0525	8.7
Torres believes the man who confessed to the killing is taking the blame for his younger brother, who just received a basketball scholarship to college. Featured opening song: Whitehead Bros. - "Forget I Was A G" Other featured song: Bone Thugs-n-Harmony - "Crossroad" Guest Stars: Taye Diggs, Chris Webber & Anthony Mason
51	25	"Deep Cover: Part 1"	Oscar L. Costo	Larry Moskowitz	The Four Tops and The Temptations; Medley: "My Girl"/"I Can't Help Myself (Sugar Pie Honey Bunch)"	May 2, 1996	K0526	8.7
While on a case against a gun Cartel, Torres kills a federal agent and begins to fear for his own life. Featured opening song: K7 - "I Love to Turn You On (Zunga Zeng)"
52	26	"If This World Were Mine: Part 2"	Arthur W. Forney	Reggie Rock Bythewood, Larry Moskowitz & Steven Phillip Smith	Monica "Let's Stay Together"	May 9, 1996	K0527	9.5
Eddie's search for the fugitive gun lord endangers Moreno; G tries to act tough when him and his mother (Fatima Faloye) are mugged. Featured opening song: Reel 2 Real featuring The Mad Stuntman - "I Like to Move It" Other featured song: R.A.W - "Asuca - Tribal Mix"

=== Season 3 (1996–97) ===
No. overall	No. in season	Title	Directed by	Written by	Musical guest and song	Original release date	Prod. code	U.S. viewers (millions)
53	1	"A Time of Faith: Part 1"	Frederick K. Keller	Reggie Rock Bythewood	112 - "After the Love Has Gone"; Kirk Franklin and the Family (as church choir) - "Melodies from Heaven"	August 29, 1996	K1501	11.94
J.C. investigates the church bombings in Harlem; a failing friendship feeds G's growing prejudice against whites; Eddie helps Nina recover from her shot wound. Other featured songs: Mista - "Blackberry Molasses", Nas (featuring Foxy Brown) - "Watch Dem ******"
54	2	"A Time of Faith: Part 2"	Frederick K. Keller	Denitria Harris-Lawrence	Bone Thugs-n-Harmony - "Tha Crossroads"; Kirk Franklin and the Family (as church choir) - "Melodies from Heaven"	September 5, 1996	K1502	10.0
Lt. Cooper orders J.C. to interrogate Rev. Harris about the arsons; Nina moves in with Eddie to recuperate. Featured opening song: The Chambers Brothers - "Time Has Come Today"
55	3	"Tough Love"	Helaine Head	Story by : Reggie Rock Bythewood & Larry Moskowitz; Teleplay by : Larry Moskowitz	The Isley Brothers "Between the Sheets"	September 12, 1996	K1503	9.5
J.C. befriends a woman whose abusive boyfriend heads a band of thieves hitting upscale apartments; Eddie asks Nina not to go back to work. Featured opening song: Blackstreet - "No Diggity"
56	4	"Blue Boy"	Frederick K. Keller	Natalie Chaidez	Soraya "Quédate"	September 19, 1996	K1504	10.6
The squad goes after a recently released child molester who becomes a suspect of a rape of an eleven year old girl; G gets into trouble at school. Featured opening song: Tricky - "Hell Is Round The Corner"
57	5	"Rule of Engagement"	Martha Mitchell	Judith McCreary	BLACKstreet "Yearning for Your Love"	September 26, 1996	K1505	11.1
Nina and McNamara work together on a case where two robbers are murdered; Nina freezes in battle and decides to turn in her gun & badge. Featured opening song: House of Pain - "Fed Up" Other featured song: Tony Rich Project - "Grass is Green"
58	6	"Kill the Noise"	Don Kurt	Judith McCreary	New Edition "You Don't Have to Worry"	October 31, 1996	K1511	8.8
Rival rappers face off when a rap artist is shot; Quincy Jones tries to make peace among all the rappers. Featured opening song: Westside Connection - "Bow Down" Other featured songs: Volume 10 - "Pistol Grip Pump"; Richie Rich (featuring Bo-Roc and Ephriam Galloway) - "Do G's Get to Go to Heaven?"
59	7	"Smack Is Back"	Jesús Salvador Treviño	Steven Phillip Smith	Tito Puente "Asia Mood"	November 7, 1996	K1506	8.9
Eddie hunts for a slick heroin dealer after his father commits suicide through an overdose; a drug dealer injects Eddie with heroin; a social worker scrutinizes J.C.'s custody of G. Featured opening song: Inner City - "Good Life" Other featured song: Quincy Jones (featuring Coolio, Yo-Yo, Shaquille O'Neal, Luniz, Charlie Wilson and Chaka Khan) - "Stomp"
60	8	"Don't Blink"	Allen Coulter	Reggie Rock Bythewood	George Benson "This Masquerade"	November 14, 1996	K1507	9.8
Nina tries to win the affections of a Chinese hit-man who is believed to have been involved in a quadruple murder in an uptown restaurant. Featured opening song: Marvin Gaye - "Trouble Man" Other featured songs: White Zombie - "Electric Head Pt. 1 (The Agony)", Martha and the Vandellas - "Nowhere to Run"
61	9	"Without Mercy"	Frederick K. Keller	Gar Anthony Haywood	The Tony Rich Project "Leavin'"	November 21, 1996	K1508	10.0
Eddie works under cover at an AIDS clinic when a bisexual man with the disease is murdered; McNamara tries to find out details about his father's death. Featured opening song: Meshell Ndegeocello - "Who Is He (And What Is He to You)?" Other featured songs: Vanessa Daou - "Waiting for the Sun to Rise", Tevin Campbell – "I Got It Bad"
62	10	"Going Platinum"	Allen Coulter	Larry Moskowitz	Phil Collins "Oughta Know By Now"	December 5, 1996	K1509	9.2
J.C. poses as a security guard to infiltrate a precious metals crime ring; McNamara digs deeper into his father's past; Capt. O'Byrne threatens Cooper's marriage. Featured opening song: Da Brat - "Sittin' on Top of the World" Other featured song: The Temptations - "Papa Was A Rolling Stone"
63	11	"Brown Like Me"	Norberto Barba	Reggie Rock Bythewood & Jorge A. Reyes	Celia Cruz, José Alberto "El Canario" & His Orchestra "Azúcar Negra"	December 19, 1996	K1510	8.7
Eddie and Nina infiltrate rival Latino gangs to investigate the shooting of a mother and a seemingly drug-motivated turf war. Other featured songs: Otis Redding - "Champagne and Wine", Reign (featuring Amel Larrieux) - "Live for the Love", Mo Thugs - "Thug Devotion"
64	12	"Grim Reaper"	Frederick K. Keller	Judith McCreary	Groove Theory "People Make the World Go Round"	January 9, 1997	K1512	11.01
Lt. Cooper is taken hostage in her office by a man threatening to blow up the precinct if his son is not given a reprieve; Nina's daughter wants to meet her. Featured opening song: Curtis Mayfield - "Here But I’m Gone" Other featured song: Faith Evans - "You Used to Love Me"
65	13	"Fade Out"	Matthew Penn	Denitria Harris-Lawrence	Aaliyah "Choosey Lover"	January 16, 1997	K1513	11.10
The murder of a youth-center leader is accidentally videotaped by a 13 year old boy who then becomes the next murder target. Featured opening song: Tony! Toni! Toné! featuring DJ Quik - "Let's Get Down"
66	14	"The Solomon Papers"	Allen Coulter	Natalie Chaidez	Me'Shell Ndege'Ocello "Ecclesiastes: Free My Heart"	January 30, 1997	K1514	10.34
The FBI dismisses the detectives from a case when the local officers suspect a link between the CIA and cocaine distribution in Harlem. Featured opening song: Rick James - "Cold Blooded" Other featured songs: Erykah Badu - "On & On", Outkast - "ATliens"
67	15	"School's Out"	Martha Mitchell	Steven Phillip Smith	Gerald Levert "A Song for You"	February 6, 1997	K1516	7.64
Nina's daughter (whom she gave up for adoption) has been kidnapped and held for ransom. Featured opening song: A+ - "All I See" Other featured song: Mobb Deep (featuring Method Man) - "Extortion"
68	16	"Outrage"	Allen Coulter	Larry Moskowitz	James Ingram "One Hundred Ways"	February 13, 1997	K1517	8.51
A former soldier steals missiles to protest federal stance on Gulf War syndrome; J.C. meets G's French teacher (Tyra Banks). Featured opening song: Mobb Deep - "Survival of the Fittest" Other featured song: Ghostface Killah (featuring Raekwon and Cappadonna) - "Daytona 500"
69	17	"The Promised Land"	Don Kurt	Reggie Rock Bythewood	Richie Havens "God Bless the Child"	February 20, 1997	K1519	8.91
J.C. comes across some possible clues in the assassination of Dr. Martin Luther King and begins a personal investigation. Featured opening song: Marvin Gaye - "The Star-Spangled Banner"
70	18	"Descell"	Frederick K. Keller	Reggie Rock Bythewood	Mint Condition "Family Affair"	March 13, 1997	K1521	9.27
Nina and McNamara infiltrate a major corporation to find the killer of a racist executive; J.C. sees G's French teacher again. Featured opening song: Stevie Wonder - "Higher Ground" Other featured song: Ray J - "Let It Go"
71	19	"Hubris"	Timothy Van Patten	Judith McCreary	Lisa Stansfield "You Know How to Love Me"	March 27, 1997	K1520	8.34
A female bounty hunter uses J.C. to help find a fugitive; Nina and McNamara probe the suspicious murder of a cop; Natasha visits the precinct. Featured opening song: Mark Morrison - "Return of the Mack" Other featured song: En Vogue - "Don't Let Go (Love)"
72	20	"The Unthinkable"	Frederick K. Keller	Denitria Harris-Lawrence	Curtis Mayfield "No One Knows About a Good Thing (You Don't Have to Cry)"	April 17, 1997	K1523	9.17
The detectives suspect a mother of being involved in a carjacking involving her two children; Nina deals with her custody battle for Melissa. Featured opening song: Maxwell - "Ascension (Don't Ever Wonder)" Other featured song: Camp Lo - "Luchini AKA This Is It"
73	21	"Vendetta"	Nick Gomez	Larry Moskowitz	Erykah Badu "Stay"	April 24, 1997	K1524	8.24
McNamara investigates possible links to the Chinese mob and his father's murder; Eddie asks his sister for a loan to buy an engagement ring for Nina. Featured opening song: Faithless - "Reverence" Other featured song: Tasha Holiday (featuring Mase) - "Just the Way You Like It"
74	22	"Is It a Crime?"	Jesús Salvador Treviño	Steven Phillip Smith	Ziggy Marley and the Melody Makers featuring Damian Marley & Julian Marley "So Much Trouble in the World"	May 1, 1997	K1525	7.80
J.C. tries to implicate a slumlord after a girl falls down his building's elevator shaft; Eddie gets cold feet while shopping for Nina's engagement ring. Featured opening song: Sweetback featuring Amel Larrieux - "You Will Rise"
75	23	"No Place Like Hell"	Norberto Barba	Reggie Rock Bythewood	Tracy Chapman "The Promise"	May 8, 1997	K1526	8.93
J.C. goes under cover at a prison to find evidence that will catch a drug lord; Eddie finally proposes to Nina. Featured opening song: Warren G - "I Shot the Sheriff" Other featured songs: Christión - "Full of Smoke", Tracey Lee - "The Theme (It's Party Time)"
76	24	"The Last Hurrah"	Don Kurt	Judith McCreary	Johnny Gill "Sunshine"	May 15, 1997	K1527	9.41
The detectives go after a bank robbery ring; a vengeful sociopath ruins Eddie and Nina's wedding ceremony. Featured opening song: Monkey Mafia featuring Patra - "Work Mi Body (Chicken Scratch Mix)" Other featured song: Junior Walker & the All Stars - "Shotgun""

=== Season 4 (1998) ===
Major cast and plot changes were made to the series at the beginning of season 4. Jonathan LaPaglia and Michael DeLorenzo departed at the end of the prior season (leading to the shooting death of Det. Tommy McNamara and the bombing death of Det. Eddie Torres), Patti D'Arbanville-Quinn was dropped from the cast (resulting in the departure of Lt. Virginia Cooper), and Malik Yoba and Lauren Velez's characters were reassigned to a new unit, with new co-workers. As a result, the nightclub Natalie's was eliminated as a regular setting, and the weekly musical guest appearances came to an end. As a result of all these changes, ratings for the show dramatically dropped forcing Fox to cancel the series.

No. overall	No. in season	Title	Directed by	Written by	Original release date	Prod. code	U.S. viewers (millions)
77	1	"Change, Change, Change"	Don Kurt	Brad Kern	January 8, 1998	K2701	8.79
Six months after the deaths of Detectives MacNamara and Torres, J.C. and Moreno are recruited by Lt. Malcolm Barker to help catch Nadine Jordan, the armored car thief and their murderer. Featured opening song: Apollo 440 - "Ain't Talkin' 'bout Dub"
78	2	"Drop Dead Gorgeous"	Norberto Barba	Kim Newton	January 15, 1998	K2704	6.77
The unit targets a modeling agent who uses his models in an extortion racket. Featured opening song: The Crystal Method - "Busy Child"
79	3	"Pipeline"	Norberto Barba	Darin Goldberg & Shelley Meals	January 22, 1998	K2705	7.13
The unit goes after a Ukrainian kingpin who is using a pipeline to distribute cocaine and causing massive deaths; Nina considers giving up her badge to spend time with her daughter. Featured opening song: Lunatic Calm - "Leave You Far Behind"
80	4	"Spare Parts"	Frederick K. Keller	Edward Tivnan	January 29, 1998	K2702	6.25
J.C. and Nell go under cover to expose a hospital that seems to have an uncanny ability to find organs for its wealthy clientele. Featured opening song: Leftfield (featuring John Lydon) - "Open Up"
81	5	"Mob Street"	Don Kurt	Brad Kern	February 12, 1998	K2706	5.45
The unit goes under cover on Wall Street to foil a stock-manipulation scheme. Featured opening song: Edwyn Collins - "A Girl Like You"
82	6	"Rat Trap"	Timothy Van Patten	Kim Newton	March 12, 1998	K2708	6.00
Detective Delaney becomes caught between her personal and professional lives when the unit searches for an arsonist who is targeting the garment district.
83	7	"Quid Pro Quo"	Martha Mitchell	Denitria Harris-Lawrence	March 19, 1998	K2709	6.33
The detectives learns that the CIA is involved in a money-laundering scheme at a bank in a Cuban neighborhood. Featured opening song: Tuatara - "Goodnight La Habana"
84	8	"Capital Punishment"	Melanie Mayron	Edward Tivnan	March 26, 1998	K2713	5.25
Williams and Delaney pose as uniformed cops in order to uncover the detectives responsible for a series of killings.Jordan in prison.
85	9	"The Unusual Suspects"	Allen Coulter	Denitria Harris-Lawrence	May 28, 1998	K2703	5.61
Following the shooting of a nanny and a baby, the unit goes undercover to try to capture the weapons suppliers.
86	10	"Sign o' the Times"	Timothy Van Patten	Darin Goldberg & Shelley Meals	June 4, 1998	K2710	5.33
The detectives investigate a serial killer who gives male victims tainted drugs. Featured opening song: Leftfield - "Afro-Left"
87	11	"Going Native"	Peter R. McIntosh	Jarrett Bryant & Brad Kern	June 11, 1998	K2711	5.91
Lt. Barker is ordered to resume a cover, in which he's part of the gang led by a civic leader who's secretly involved in extortion. Featured opening song: War - "Me and Baby Brother"
88	12	"The Troubles"	Robert Wiemer	Story by : Denitria Harris-Lawrence & Kim Newton & Andrew Smith; Teleplay by : Denitria Harris-Lawrence & Kim Newton	June 25, 1998	K2712	5.33
Delaney poses as a bartender in order to learn why three Irish terrorists were killed and why there were in America. Featured opening song: Máire Brennan - "Against the Wind"
89	13	"Catharsis"	Don Kurt	Story by : Gay Walch; Teleplay by : Brad Kern & Gay Walch	February 11, 1999	K2713	N/A
A radical group kidnaps a child for bargaining purposes; Moreno gets even for the death of her husband and her partner when she meets Jordan in prison.
