= Holy Land (disambiguation) =

Holy Land is a term used by Jews, Christians, and Muslims to describe the Land of Israel and Palestinian territories.

Holy Land, The Holy Land or Holyland may also refer to:

== Places ==
- Holy Land, a name often used for the Crusader states
- Holyland (Belfast), an area in Belfast, Northern Ireland, UK
- Holy Land of the English a nickname for The Fens due to the number of monasteries.
- Holy Land (Liverpool), an area of south Toxteth, Liverpool, UK
- The Holyland (Wisconsin), a region in Wisconsin, US

== Arts and entertainment ==
- Holy Land (album), an album by Brazilian power metal band Angra
- The Holy Land (album), an album by American country singer Johnny Cash
- The Holy Land (film), a 2001 Israeli drama film directed by Eitan Gorlin
- Holy Lands, a 2017 film starring James Caan
- Holyland (manga), a Japanese manga series by Kōji Mori
- Holy Land Experience, a theme park in Orlando, Florida, US
- Holy Land, a planned attraction at Ghost Town in the Sky theme park in Maggie Valley, North Carolina, US

== Other uses ==
- Holyland Case, a legal case about the Holyland complex in Jerusalem
- Holyland Model of Jerusalem, a 1:50 scale model of the city of Jerusalem in the late Second Temple period
- Holy Land USA, a miniature representation of Jerusalem and Bethlehem in Waterbury, Connecticut
- William Hopkins Holyland (1807–1882), English accountant
- Sacred spaces in general

== See also ==
- Holiest sites in Islam (disambiguation)
- Promised Land (disambiguation)
