= Promised Land (disambiguation) =

The Promised Land is the land that God promised to Abraham and his descendants. In modern contexts it is an idea related to the restored homeland for the Jewish people and the concepts of salvation and liberation.

Promised Land or Land of Promise may also refer to:

== Religious and historical meanings ==
- Land of Israel
- Palestine (region)
- Holy Land
- Tír Tairngire ('Promised Land'), the Celtic Otherworld in Irish mythology

== Arts and entertainment ==
=== Literature ===
- Promised Land (novel), a Spenser novel by Robert B. Parker, 1976
- Promised Land: Thirteen Books That Changed America, by Jay Parini, 2008
- A Promised Land, a 2020 memoir by former United States President Barack Obama
- The Promised Land (autobiography), by Mary Antin, 1912
- The Promised Land (novel) (Ziemia obiecana), by Władysław Reymont, 1899
- Land of Promise: An Economic History of the United States, a 2012 book by Michael Lind

=== Film ===
- Promised Land (1987 film), starring Kiefer Sutherland and Meg Ryan
- Promised Land (2002 film), a South African film based on the novel by Karel Schoeman
- Promised Land (2004 film), a French-Israeli film
- Promised Land (2012 film), an American drama film by Gus Van Sant
- The Promised Land (1925 film), a French silent film
- The Promised Land (1973 film), a Chilean film
- The Promised Land (1975 film) (Ziemia obiecana), a Polish drama
- The Promised Land (1986 film), a Yugoslav film
- The Promised Land (2015 film), a Chinese film
- The Promised Land (2023 film), or Bastarden, a Danish-language film
- Swapnabhumi (The Promised Land), a 2007 Bangladeshi documentary

=== Television ===
- Promised Land (1996 TV series), an American drama series
- Promised Land (2022 TV series), an American family drama
- "Promised Land" (Quantum Leap), a 1992 episode
- "Promised Land" (The Vampire Diaries), a 2014 episode
- "Promised Land", an Inspector Morse episode, 1991
- "Promised Land", an episode of The Outer Limits, 1998
- "Promised Land", an episode of Treme, 2012
- The Promised Land (miniseries), or Les Brûlés, a Canadian historical drama television miniseries
- "The Promised Land" (New York Undercover), a 1997 episode
- The Promised Land, a story-arc in Doctor Who (series 8)
- Red Dwarf: The Promised Land, a 2020 British TV film

=== Music ===
==== Albums ====
- Promised Land (Dar Williams album), 2008
- Promised Land (Elvis Presley album), 1975
- Promised Land (Harold Land album), 2001
- Promised Land (Queensrÿche album), 1994
- Promised Land (Robert Walker album), 1997
- Promised Land (Rurutia album), 2004
- The Promised Land (Muzz album), 2020
- The Promised Land (Sagol 59 album), by Sagol 59 and Ami Yares
- The Promised Land, a 2006 album by Del McCoury Band
- The Promised Land, two albums by Zug Izland
- The Promise Land, a 2001 album by Cedar Walton
- The Promiseland, an album by Willie Nelson, 1986
- Promised Land, a 1998 EP by Dispatched

==== Songs ====
- "Promised Land" (Chuck Berry song), 1965, also recorded by Elvis Presley in 1974
- "Promised Land" (Crash Test Dummies song), 2015
- "Promised Land" (Joe Smooth song), 1987, also recorded by The Style Council
- "Promised Land" (TobyMac song), 2021
- "The Promised Land" (Bruce Springsteen song), 1978
- "Promised Land", a 2010 song by Avantasia from Angel of Babylon
- "Promised Land", a 1995 song by Cast from All Change
- "Promised Land", a song by Dennis Brown
- "Promised Land", a 2005 song by Edan from Beauty and the Beat
- "Promised Land", a 2000 song by Heavenly from Coming from the Sky
- "Promised Land", a 1998 song by L'Arc-en-Ciel HEART
- "Promised Land", a 1998 song by Primal Fear from Primal Fear
- "Promised Land", a 1983 song by Riot from Born in America
- "Promised Land", a 2021 song by TobyMac
- "Promised Land", a song by the fictional band Vesuvius featured in The Rocker
- "Promised Land", a 2025 song by Young Fathers composed for the horror film 28 Years Later
- "The Promised Land", a 1996 song by DJ Paul Elstak
- "The Promised Land", a song by Justin Hayward from The View from the Hill
- "A Promised Land (Outro)", a 2021 song by Semler
- "Promiseland", a 2015 song by Mika from No Place in Heaven
- "Promiseland", a 2016 song by Sebell
- "Land of Promise", a 2010 song by Nas and Damian Marley from Distant Relatives

==== Other uses in music ====
- Promise Land (band), an American Christian rock band
- Promise Land (DJs), an Italian DJ and production duo
- Promised Land (duo), English duo of Nick Feldman and Jon Moss
- The Promised Land (Saint-Saëns), an oratorio by Camille Saint-Saëns

=== Other uses in arts and entertainment ===
- Promised Land (CBC Radio One), a radio documentary
- The Promised Land (radio program), an American radio show
- The Promised Land (sculpture), by David Manuel, 1993, in Portland, Oregon, US
- The Promised Land, a plot device in the Final Fantasy VII video game series

== Places ==
=== Australia ===
- Promisedland, Queensland
- Promised Land, Tasmania

=== United States ===
- Promise Land, Arkansas
- Promised Land (Braithwaite, Louisiana), a historic mansion
- Promised Land, Mississippi
- Promised Land, New York
- Promised Land, South Carolina
- Promise Land, Tennessee
- Promised Land State Park, Pennsylvania
- Promised Land station, a former railroad station on the Long Island Rail Road

== See also ==
- Holy Land (disambiguation)
- Ziemia obiecana (disambiguation)
