= Daniel Glass (drummer) =

American drummer

- Born: May 16, 1966 (age 59)
- Other name: Bam Bam
- Occupations: Drummer; Author; Educator; Clinician; Historian
- Musical career
- Genres: Jazz; Big Band; Swing; Rhythm & Blues
- Instruments: Drums; Percussion
- Years active: 1991–present
- Labels: Surfdog Records; Warner Bros.; Warner Music Group
- Website: danielglass.com

Daniel Glass (born May 16, 1966) is an American drummer, author, historian and educator. He is recognized in the drum industry as an authority on classic American drumming and the evolution of American Popular Music.

== Educator/Clinician ==
As an educator, Glass has published several books and DVDs, including, The Century Project DVD (winner of the Modern Drummer reader's poll: Best Education Package, 2010), Music Alive!'s Percussion, The Commandments of Early Rhythm and Blues Drumming (co-written with Zoro and the winner of the 2009 Drum! Magazine Drummie Award for "Best Drumming Book.") and The Roots of Rock Drumming (co-edited with Journey drummer, Steve Smith and voted one of the top four drumming books of 2014 by Drum! Magazine.) Glass has also contributed to the Encyclopedia of Percussion (second edition) with the "Rock 'n' Roll Drumming (1948-2000)" chapter, and is a regular contributor to publications like Modern Drummer, Drum! and Classic Drummer Magazine. He has performed hundreds of clinics and master classes globally, appearing at many educational conferences and music festivals. In 2013, he co-curated an exhibit on the history of the drum set at the Rhythm Discovery Center in Indianapolis, Indiana, for which he was awarded the Percussive Arts Society’s "Distinguished Service Award."

== Performer ==
Glass is a member of the pioneering swing group Royal Crown Revue since 1994, Glass has recorded and performed all over the world with many artists, including Brian Setzer, Bette Midler, Liza Minnelli, Marilyn Maye, Klea Blackhurst, Lorna Luft, Chita Rivera, Lucie Arnaz, Freddy Cole, Mike Ness, Johnny Boyd, Debbie Davies, Unknown Hinson, Glen Glenn, Robert Gordon, and Gene Simmons of Kiss. He was twice voted one of the top five R&B drummers in the world by readers of Modern Drummer and Drum! magazine.

== Discography ==
=== With Royal Crown Revue ===
Year	Title	Artist	Label	Credits
1994	"Hollywood Tales"	Royal Crown Revue	By Our Records	Musician
1996	"Mugzy's Move"	Royal Crown Revue	Warner Bros.	Drums, Percussion
1997	"Caught in the Act — Live!"	Royal Crown Revue	SurfDog	Drums, Percussion
1998	“The Contender”	Royal Crown Revue	Warner Bros.	Composer, Drums, Percussion
1999	"Walk on Fire"	Royal Crown Revue	SideOneDummy	Composer, Drums, Percussion
2001	"Passport to Australia — Live"	Royal Crown Revue	Disk Union	Drums, Vocals
2004	"Greetings from Hollywood"	Royal Crown Revue	Kufala	Executive Producer, Producer, Composer, Drums, Percussion, Backing Vocals
2007	"El Toro"	Royal Crown Revue	Kufala Records	Drums
2007	"Live in Australia"	Royal Crown Revue	LiveBand.com	Musician
2010	"Don't Be a Grinch This Year"	Royal Crown Revue	RCR Records	Musician

=== With other artists ===
Year	Title	Artist	Label	Credits
1992	“Mini Diaz”	Mini Diaz	M2 Records	Musician
1995	“A Young Person’s Guide”	The Dambuilders	East-West/Chuaca	Drums, Tambourine, Backing Vocals
1998	“Bathhouse Betty”	Bette Midler	Warner Bros.	Drums
1999	“Malediction”	Botanica	Checkered Past	Drums
2000	“Cheating at Solitaire”	Mike Ness	TimeBomb/Sony Records	Drums, Snare Drum
2001	“Last Word In”	Johnny Boyd	Cliffhanger	Musician
2001	“That’s Him Officer"	Vinnie Santino	Pacific Force	Drums
2001	“Jazz Baby! Cool Tunes For Cool Kids”	Compilation	Flying South	Musician
2001	“Stendahl’s Syndrome"	Ensemble Abstract	Pacific Force	Drums
2001	“Mutually Cognizant”	Ensemble Abstract	Pacific Force	Drums
2001	“Track-Whore Compilation Volume 2, Logan’s Run”	Track-Whore	Track-Whore	Musician
2001	“Double Wide Live”	The Saddle Tramps		Musician
2002	“Makin’ Time”	Scott Steen	SS Records	Musician
2002	“City of Angles”	Industrial Jazz Group	Annova	Musician
2002	“something colorful”	The Daniel Glass Trio	Very Tall Music	Primary Artist (Producer, Composer, Drums)
2004	“Here Come the Billionaires”	The Billionaires		Musician
2004	“The Billionaires Are in the House”	The Billionaires		Musician
2004	“All Aboard America”	All Aboard America	Bald Eagle Media	Musician
2004	“Think About It”	Alex Schultz	Severn Records	Musician
2004	“Dig That Beat”	The Travellers	Low-Fi Records	Producer, Musician
2005	“Exotic Tales”	Eldad Tarmu Quartet	Very Tall Music	Producer, Musician (Drums)
2005	“Time and Again”	Raymond Patterson	RP Presents	Musician
2005	“Dig Dag Diggin’ Tour 2004"	The Travellers	Low-Fi Records	Musician
2005	“Broken Wheel”	Chris Murphy	Kufala Records	Drums
2005	“Juniper”	Chris Murphy	Kufala Recordings	Drums
2005	“Jazz Baby, Volume 1"	Jazz Baby	Casablanca Kids	Musician
2005	“Jazz Baby, Volume 2"	Jazz Baby	Casablanca Kids	Musician
2005	“Jazz Baby, Volume 3"	Jazz Baby	Casablanca Kids	Musician
2005	“Industrial Jazzwerke, Volume 1”	Industrial Jazz Group	UglyRug Music	Musician
2006	“The Redondos”	The Redondos	Royal Songbird Records	Musician
2006	“Karling Abbeygate”	Karling Abbeygate	Dionysis Records	Drums
2006	“World in a Bottle“	Bart Ryan	R5 Recordings	Musician
2006	“Devil’s Serenade”	Mora’s Modern Rhythmists	Mr. Ace Records	Musician
2007	“Venture Capital Follies of 1929”	GKM Newport Orchestra	Long After Lunch Records	Musician
2007	“The Curse of the Songwriter”	PI Jacobs	ThatCrazyChick Music	Musician
2007	“Playing Favorites”	Scott Steen	Chrome Dome Music	Musician
2007	“The Return of Eve”	Devil Doll	DuffyRecords	Musician
2007	“Starlight”	Johnny Boyd	CliffDive Records	Musician
2008	“Show of Stars”	King Paris / Martini Kings	Swingomatic	Musician
2008	“Sittin’ in the Catbird Seat”	Marie Fleur	Sutcliffe Music	Drums
2008	“Introducing the Rhythm Club All-Stars”	Rhythm Club All Stars	Very Tall Music	Producer, Musician
2008	“Poor Man’s Paradise”	Ted Russell Kamp	System Records	Drums
2009	“Introducing Jennifer Keith”	Jennifer Keith	Rhythm Train Records	Musician
2010	“At Times Like This”	Nancy Weiss	N.A.W. Music	Musician
2010	“Whoopee! Hey! Hey!”	Janet Klein & Her Parlor Boys	Coeur de Janette	Drums, Percussion
2011	“Think About It”	Alex Schultz	Severn	Musician
2011	“’Jenny’ is Her Name”	Jennifer Keith		Musician
2011	“Get Back to the Land”	Ted Russell Kamp	Dualtone Music	Drums
2012	“Never Been Blue”	Johnny Boyd	Cliffdive Records	Musician
2012	“Bébé Licorne”	Marie Fleur		Drums
2012	“Songs Without Words”	Ian Whitcomb	Rivermont	Musician
2012	“The Fabulous Dorseys”	The Anderson Twins	PW Music	Musician
2012	“Classical Themes in Jazz”	Peter Anderson and Will Anderson	PW Music	Drums
2015	“Imagine Your Heart’s Journeys”	Abigail Lumsden		Drums
2015	“Imagine Your Heart’s Journeys, Volume 2”	Abigail Lumsden		Drums
2019	“Call Me Old Fashioned”	Max Von Essen	MVE Records	Drums
2019	“Christmas at Birdland”	Billy Stritch, Jim Caruso, and Klea Blackhurst	Club44 Records	Drums
2020	“My Ship: Songs from 1941”	Dawn Derow		Musician
2020	“Love Notes”	Linda Lavin	Club44 Records	Drums

== Endorsements ==
Glass endorses Drum Workshop/DW Drums (drums/pedals/hardware), Crescent cymbals, Vic Firth (drumsticks and brushes), and Aquarian Drumheads.
