= Zoro (drummer) =

American drummer (born 1962)

Zoro (born Daniel Donnelly, June 13, 1962) also known as The Minister of Groove is an American drummer whose style includes rock, R&B, and hip hop.

Zoro has toured and recorded with Lenny Kravitz, Bobby Brown, Frankie Valli and the Four Seasons, New Edition, Jody Watley, Sean Lennon, Philip Bailey, Lisa Marie Presley, and Throttle Body Motorcycle Club, among others. He was named the number one R&B drummer and clinician in industry magazines including Modern Drummer and Drum!.

== Author ==
Zoro is the author of five books. The Commandments of R&B Drumming earned him a Modern Drummer Reader's Poll #1 Educational text vote. The book was expanded and re-released by Alfred Publishing in a 10th anniversary edition. The follow-up, The Commandments of Early R&B Drumming was written with Daniel Glass. In 2011, he published The Big Gig, a book centered on achievement in the music industry. In September 2016 he released SOAR!: 9 Proven Keys For Unlocking Your Limitless Potential.

In 2024, he published his memoir, Maria's Scarf: A Memoir of a Mother's Love, a Son's Perseverance, and Dreaming Big, about the enduring influence of his mother, a struggling actress, immigrant, and single parent.

== Christian Faith ==
In addition to his work in music, Zoro is a Christian Motivational speaker appearing at festivals and churches around the world. He has been featured on Christian television, including the 700 Club, Daystar Celebration, Jc-TV, The Joni Show, MorningStar Ministries, among other broadcasts.

== Ministry and Motivational Speaking and Teaching ==
Now working out of Nashville, TN, Zoro is increasingly focused on his Ministry and motivational speaking work for groups like Big Brothers Big Sisters and Compassion International.

Zoro is currently a percussion instructor at Belmont University in Nashville. He is also a pastor at Bayside Church Adventure Campus in Roseville, CA.

== Gear and Equipment ==
Zoro endorses DW Drums and hardware, Evans Drumheads, Sabian Cymbals, Vic Firth Drumsticks and Latin Percussion. His most recent set of note was played during his 2004 engagement with Lenny Kravitz, drumming on the "Baptism" tour.
