= Miss Thing =

Miss Thing or Ms. Thing may refer to:

== People ==
- Ms. Thing (singer), Jamaican dancehall singer

== Fiction ==
- Miss Thing, a character in the play A Kiss for Cinderella (1916)
- Miss Thing, a character in the film You're a Big Boy Now (1966)
- Miss Thing, a character created by cartoonist Joe Johnson (1960s–1970s)
- Miss Thing, a character in the song "I Got My Education" by Uncanny Alliance (1992)
- Miss Thing, a character in the television series The Grimleys (1997)
- Miss Thing, a character in the television series Timmy Towers (1997)
- Ms. Thing (Marvel Comics), a superhero character in Marvel Comics (2012)

== Music ==
- "Miss Thing", a song by Hubert Laws from the album The Laws of Jazz (1964)
- "Miss Thing", a song by Melba Moore from the album Burn (1979)
- "Miss Thing", a song by Adam Ant from the album Vive Le Rock (1985)

== Other uses ==
- Ms. Thing, 2010 short film, screenplay by Mette Bach and directed by Karen X. Tulchinsky
- Ms. Thing Productions, a production company for Ella Joyce

== See also ==
- Everybody's Talkin' 'bout Miss Thing!, album by Lavay Smith & Her Red Hot Skillet Lickers
- "Miss a Thing", song by Kylie Minogue from the album Disco
- Miss Thang, album by Monica
- Mr Thing, hip hop producer
- Thing (disambiguation)
