= Ziemia obiecana =

Ziemia obiecana (Polish, 'Promised Land') may refer to:

== Film and television ==
- The Promised Land (novel), (Ziemia obiecana), by Władysław Reymont, 1898
- Ziemia obiecana (1927 film), directed by A. Węgierski, based on the novel
- The Promised Land (1975 film) (Ziemia obiecana), a Polish drama film based on the novel
- Ziemia obiecana (TV series), a Polish television series, 1978

== Other uses ==
- Ziemia Obiecana, a 2009 EP by Star Guard Muffin
- "Ziemia obiecana", a song from the 2000 album Fin de siecle
- Ziemia obiecana, a Polish translation of A Promised Land, a 2020 a memoir by Barack Obama

== See also ==
- Promised Land (disambiguation)
