= Natasha Fatah =

Canadian journalist (born 1976)

- Born: Natasha Fatah; January 1, 1980 (age 46); Karachi, Sindh, Pakistan
- Citizenship: (Canada) Canadian
- Education: University of Toronto
- Occupations: Journalist, news presenter
- Employer: CBC News Network
- Spouse: Chris Kayaniotes

Natasha Fatah (born 1 January 1980) is a Canadian journalist, based in Toronto, Ontario. She is a host for CBC News Network.

== Early life and education ==
Fatah was born in Karachi, Pakistan and spent most of her childhood in Riyadh and Jeddah in Saudi Arabia; she has also lived in Amsterdam, Montreal and Mexico City.

Fatah attended Pickering High School, Ajax. Fatah earned a degree in political science at the University of Toronto, and then earned another degree in journalism at Toronto's Ryerson University (now Toronto Metropolitan University).

== Career ==
From 1999 to 2000, Fatah was co-chair of the Ontario New Democratic Youth. In the wake of the 1999 Ontario provincial election, Fatah called for Howard Hampton to resign his leadership of the Ontario New Democratic Party.

She was a producer at CBC Radio One's national current affairs radio show As It Happens, Toronto beat reporter for its Ontario regional weekend morning show Fresh Air, and author of the column "Minority Report" in CBC.ca's Viewpoint section from 2004 to 2013. She has been a television and radio reporter for CBC Windsor, filing for CBE radio and CBET-TV.

Fatah has produced documentaries and news reports from Pakistan, India and Indonesia.

In the summer of 2010, Fatah hosted the CBC Radio One summer program Promised Land, a series which presented stories about refugees to Canada.

As of April 2019, she is the anchor of CBC's News Network, appearing on Sundays and Fridays.

Fatah has appeared as the host of CBC News Network Weekend and the current affairs program, In-Depth with Natasha Fatah.

== Personal life ==
Her father was internationally recognized author and secular Muslim activist Tarek Fatah, who was a Sunni Punjabi. Her mother, Nargis Tapal, hails from a prominent Shia Bohra family of Gujarati origin.

In 2011, she married Chris Kayaniotes. On 14 April 2019, Fatah interviewed actress and activist Nazanin Boniadi about the fate of human rights lawyer, Nasrin Sotoudeh, recently sentenced for up to 38 years in Tehran, Iran.
