= One True Thing =

1998 American drama film

- Theatrical release poster
- Directed by: Carl Franklin
- Written by: Karen Croner
- Based on: One True Thing by Anna Quindlen
- Produced by: Jesse Beaton; Leslie Morgan; Harry J. Ufland; William W. Wilson III
- Starring: Meryl Streep; Renée Zellweger; William Hurt; Tom Everett Scott; Nicky Katt; Lauren Graham
- Cinematography: Declan Quinn
- Edited by: Carole Kravetz
- Music by: Cliff Eidelman
- Distributed by: Universal Pictures
- Release date: September 18, 1998
- Running time: 127 minutes
- Country: United States
- Language: English
- Budget: $30 million
- Box office: $26.6 million

One True Thing is a 1998 American drama film directed by Carl Franklin. It tells the story of a woman in her 20s who is forced to put her life on hold in order to care for her mother, who is dying of cancer. The script was adapted by Karen Croner from the novel by Anna Quindlen, with the story being based on Quindlen's own struggle with the death of her mother, Prudence Pantano Quindlen, from ovarian cancer in 1972.

The film stars Meryl Streep, Renée Zellweger, William Hurt, and Tom Everett Scott. Bette Midler sings the lead song, "My One True Friend", over the end credits. The track was first released on Midler's 1998 album Bathhouse Betty. The film was shot in Morristown, New Jersey and Maplewood, New Jersey, as well as at the campus of Princeton University.

== Plot ==
Ellen Gulden has a high-pressure job writing for New York magazine. Ellen is visiting her family home for her father George's surprise birthday party. It becomes obvious that she deeply admires George, a once-celebrated novelist and literature professor at Princeton University, but Ellen has barely restrained disdain for her mother, Kate, and the domestic life she lives.

When it is discovered that Kate has cancer, George pressures Ellen to come home and take care of her mother. Ellen is taken aback by this request, knowing it could jeopardize her career and love interest. However, she eventually agrees, caving in to her father's appeals and inducements.

As Ellen helps her mother with domestic chores while her father goes about his usual business without helping much, Ellen begins to reassess her views of her parents. She realizes she always brushed her mother aside and idealized her father, despite his self-centered focus on his career and, she discovers, a longtime habit of having flings with his female students.

Ellen attempts to find a place for herself in her parents' life while struggling to continue writing on a freelance basis and maintain her relationship with her boyfriend in New York. Over time, Ellen grows closer to her mother and learns more about her parents' marriage—including realizing that Kate has known about George's affairs all along. Ellen also learns that her father's philandering days have become lonely nights of drinking at a local bar to numb the pain of never again achieving success with, nor even being able to complete, further novels. George admits to Ellen the reason he loved Kate was that she was full of light shining through everything, and he could not bear the thought of her light slipping away.

As her mother is dying, Ellen tells her she loves her, and Kate says she knew it and always had. At the funeral, Ellen ends her relationship with her boyfriend.

After Kate's death, the autopsy reveals that Kate actually died of morphine overdose. A district attorney questions Ellen about her mother's death. Scenes from this interview are interspersed throughout the movie and raise the suspicion that Ellen assisted her mother's suicide. In the closing scene, by Kate's grave, Ellen has returned from a new job she found in New York with the Village Voice. She is planting daffodils when her father approaches and tells her that she was very brave to do what she did. She looks puzzled until she realizes George thinks she had given her mother the fatal overdose. Ellen replies that she had thought the accomplice was the father. They both realize Kate must have killed herself.

George speaks to Ellen about how much he loved Kate, considering her his muse, his "one true thing." Ellen explains to her father how to plant the daffodil bulbs and he helps her, foreshadowing their reconciliation based on a mutual and long-overdue appreciation of Kate.

== Cast ==
- Meryl Streep as Kate Gulden
- Renée Zellweger as Ellen Gulden
- William Hurt as George Gulden
- Tom Everett Scott as Brian Gulden
- Lauren Graham as Jules
- Nicky Katt as Jordan Belzer
- James Eckhouse as District Attorney
- Gerrit Graham as Oliver Most
- Patrick Breen as Mr. Tweedy
- Julianne Nicholson as College student

== Reception ==
=== Critical response ===
One True Thing received mostly favorable reviews from critics, with Streep being the subject of acclaim for bringing warmth and natural energy instead of appearing cold and technical. On Rotten Tomatoes the film has a rating of 87% based on reviews from 61 critics. The site's consensus states: "Solid performances lift this drama to a higher level." The similar site Metacritic grades it 63 out of 100 based on reviews from 25 critics, indicating "generally favorable reviews". Audiences surveyed by CinemaScore gave the film a grade "A" on a scale of A to F.

Todd McCarthy of Variety called it "sensitively written, fluidly directed and expertly acted." Roger Ebert, reviewing the film for the Chicago Sun-Times, commended it for rising above the level of a soap through pure craftsmanship, and awarded the film three stars out of four.

Mick LaSalle in the San Francisco Chronicle declared, "After One True Thing, critics who persist in the fiction that Streep is a cold and technical actress will need to get their heads examined. She is so instinctive and natural – so thoroughly in the moment and operating on flights of inspiration – that she's able to give us a woman who's at once wildly idiosyncratic and utterly believable." Los Angeles Times film critic Kenneth Turan noted, "[Streep's role] is one of the least self-consciously dramatic and surface showy of her career, but Streep adds a level of honesty and reality that makes [her performance] one of her most moving." Among the few negative reviews, Salon.com's Andrew O'Hehir complained that the movie "really has no plot", and found director Carl Franklin unable to properly connect with his cast.

=== Accolades ===
Streep was nominated for the Academy Award for Best Actress for her performance in the film, but lost out to Gwyneth Paltrow for her role in Shakespeare in Love.
