= Get Get Down =

1999 single by Paul Johnson

Single by Paul Johnson

from the album The Groove I Have
- Released: June 2, 1999
- Genre: House
- Length: 3:13
- Label: Moody
- Songwriter: Paul Johnson
- Producer: Paul Johnson

Paul Johnson singles chronology
"Get On My Camel" (1999)	"Get Get Down" (1999)	"Noise" (2000)

"Get Get Down" is a song by American DJ and producer Paul Johnson. It was released in June 1999 as a single from his 1999 album The Groove I Have. "Get Get Down" topped the US Billboard Dance Club Play chart and peaked within the top 10 of the charts of France, Greece, the Netherlands, the United Kingdom, and Wallonia. In 2025, Billboard magazine ranked the song number two in their list of "The 50 Best House Songs of All Time".

== Track listings ==
- US CD single
1. "Get Get Down" (original mix)
2. "Get Get Down" (Latin Excursion mix)
3. "Get Get Down" (dancefloor dub)
4. "Get Get Down" (Sounds of Life Cariola mix)
5. "Get Get Down" (Choo Choo's Digital Pimp mix)
6. "Get Get Down" (Conga Squad Turbulance mix)
7. "Get Get Down" (Get Get Nerio's Dubwork mix)
8. "Get Get Down" (Billy Lo's Friday Night Ruffneck Vision remix)
- US 12-inch single

A1. "Get Get Down" (the dance floor dub)
B1. "Get Get Down" (Latin Excursion mix)
B2. "Get Get Down" (Get Get Nerio's Dubwork mix)

- Australian and New Zealand CD single
1. "Get Get Down" (radio edit)
2. "Get Get Down" (Choo Choo's Subcriminal mix)
3. "Get Get Down" (Choo Choo's Digital Pimp mix)
4. "Get Get Down" (original version)
5. "Get Get Down" (Sounds of Life Cariola mix)
6. "Get Get Down" (XXX remix) – 5:28
- UK CD1
1. "Get Get Down" (original mix)
2. "Get Get Down" (Choo Choo's Subcriminal mix)
3. "Get Get Down" (dancefloor dub)
- UK CD2
1. "Get Get Down" (Latin Excursion mix)
2. "Get Get Down" (Sounds of Life dub mix)
3. "Get Get Down" (XXX remix)
- UK 12-inch single

A1. "Get Get Down" (original mix)
AA1. "Get Get Down" (Choo Choo's Subcriminal mix)
AA2. "Get Get Down" (Choo Choo's Digital Pimp mix)

- UK cassette single

A1. "Get Get Down" (original mix)
B1. "Get Get Down" (XXX remix)
B2. "Get Get Down" (Choo Choo's Subcriminal mix)

- French CD single
1. "Get Get Down" (original radio) – 3:09
2. "Get Get Down" (XXX remix) – 5:28

== Charts ==
=== Weekly charts ===
Weekly chart performance for "Get Get Down"
Chart (1999–2000)	Peak position
Australia (ARIA)	38
Belgium (Ultratop 50 Flanders)	27
Belgium (Ultratop 50 Wallonia)	7
Canada Dance/Urban (RPM)	1
Europe (Eurochart Hot 100)	13
France (SNEP)	9
Germany (GfK)	29
Greece (IFPI)	3
Ireland (IRMA)	19
Netherlands (Dutch Top 40)	3
Netherlands (Single Top 100)	3
Spain (Promusicae)	14
Switzerland (Schweizer Hitparade)	18
UK Singles (Official Charts)	5
US Dance Club Songs (Billboard)	1

=== Year-end charts ===
Year-end chart performance for "Get Get Down"
Chart (1999)	Position
Belgium (Ultratop 50 Wallonia)	63
Europe (Eurochart Hot 100)	57
Europe Border Breakers (Music & Media)	23
France (SNEP)	57
Netherlands (Dutch Top 40)	47
Netherlands (Single Top 100)	63
UK Singles (OCC)	122

Chart (2000)	Position
Europe Border Breakers (Music & Media)	96

== Certifications ==
Certifications and sales for "Get Get Down"
Region	Certification	Certified units/sales
United Kingdom (BPI)	Silver	200,000^{‡}
^{‡} Sales+streaming figures based on certification alone.

== Release history ==
Release dates and formats for "Get Get Down"
Region	Date	Format(s)	Label(s)	Ref.
Spain	June 2, 1999	12-inch vinyl	Vendetta	
United Kingdom	September 13, 1999	CD	Defected	
Spain	September 17, 1999	12-inch remix vinyl	Vendetta	
United Kingdom	September 20, 1999	12-inch vinyl	Defected	

== See also ==
- List of number-one dance singles of 1999 (U.S.)
