= My One True Friend =

Single by Bette Midler

from the album Bathhouse Betty
- Released: August 1998
- Genre: Pop
- Length: 3:49
- Label: Warner Bros.
- Songwriters: Carole King; Carole Bayer Sager; David Foster
- Producer: David Foster

Bette Midler singles chronology
"You Don't Own Me" (1996)	"My One True Friend" (1998)	"I'm Beautiful" (1999)

Audio video
- "My One True Friend (From the Motion Picture One True Thing)" on YouTube

"My One True Friend" is a song recorded by American singer Bette Midler for her ninth studio album Bathhouse Betty (1998). The song was written by Carole King, Carole Bayer Sager and David Foster, the latter also acted as producer.

The song was released as the lead single from the album in August 1998 and reached number 16 on the Billboard's Adult Contemporary chart. The song also became the soundtrack to the Carl Franklin film One True Thing.

== Critical reception ==
The reviewer of Billboard magazine gave a positive assessment of the song, calling it "a refreshing pop ballad that is designed to touch the hearts of everyone who has not yet moved away from "Wind Beneath My Wings"". He also noted how producer David Foster dresses Midler in a wonderfully great orchestration, and co-author Carole King surrounds the diva with sweeping piano lines, while Midler herself, in his opinion, gives a touching, appropriately melodramatic performance.

== Track listing ==
CD single (Europe)

1. "My One True Friend" – 3:49
2. "Heaven" – 3:29
3. "I'm Hip" – 2:45

CD single (Germany)

1. "My One True Friend" – 3:49
2. "Heaven" — 3:29

CD promotional single (USA)

1. "My One True Friend" – 3:49

== Charts ==
Chart performance for "My One True Friend"
Chart (1998)	Peak position
Canada Adult Contemporary (RPM)	49
Netherlands (Single Top 100)	87
UK Singles (Official Charts)	58
US Adult Contemporary (Billboard)	16
