= List of Billboard number-one dance singles of 1999 =

Billboard magazine compiled the top-performing dance singles in the United States during 1999 on two Hot Dance Music charts: the Club Play and the Maxi-Singles Sales. Premiered in 1976, the Club Play chart ranked the most-played singles on dance club based on reports from a national sample of club DJs. The Maxi-Singles Sales chart was launched in 1985 to compile the best-selling dance singles based on retail sales across the United States.

== Charts history ==
Chart history
Issue date	Hot Dance Music/Club Play		Hot Dance Music/Maxi-Singles Sales		Ref.
Issue date	Song	Artist(s)	Song	Artist(s)	Ref.
January 2	"Believe"	Cher	"Believe"	Cher	
January 9	"Believe"	Cher	"Believe"	Cher	
January 16	"Up and Down"	Vengaboys	"Believe"	Cher	
January 23	"It's Not Right but It's Okay"	Whitney Houston	"Believe"	Cher	
January 30	"It's Not Right but It's Okay"	Whitney Houston	"Believe"	Cher	
February 6	"It's Not Right but It's Okay"	Whitney Houston	"Believe"	Cher	
February 13	"I'm Beautiful"	Bette Midler	"Believe"	Cher	
February 20	"I'm Beautiful"	Bette Midler	"I'm Beautiful"	Bette Midler	
February 27	"Skin"	Charlotte	"Believe"	Cher	
March 6	"(You Got Me) Burnin' Up"	Cevin Fisher featuring Loleatta Holloway	"Believe"	Cher	
March 13	"Nothing Really Matters"	Madonna	"Believe"	Cher	
March 20	"Nothing Really Matters"	Madonna	"Believe"	Cher	
March 27	"Jackie's Strength"	Tori Amos	"Believe"	Cher	
April 3	"Heartbreak Hotel"	Whitney Houston featuring Faith Evans and Kelly Price	"Believe"	Cher	
April 10	"I Still Believe"	Mariah Carey	"Believe"	Cher	
April 17	"Baby Wants to Ride"	Hani	"Believe"	Cher	
April 24	"Body"	Funky Green Dogs	"Blue Monday"	Orgy	
May 1	"Strong Enough"	Cher	"Believe"	Cher	
May 8	"It's Over Now"	Deborah Cox	"Livin' La Vida Loca"	Ricky Martin	
May 15	"It's Over Now"	Deborah Cox	"Livin' La Vida Loca"	Ricky Martin	
May 22	"Unspeakable Joy"	Kim English	"Livin' La Vida Loca"	Ricky Martin	
May 29	"Got the Groove"	SM-Trax	"Livin' La Vida Loca"	Ricky Martin	
June 5	"Sexual (Li Da Di)"	Amber	"Livin' La Vida Loca"	Ricky Martin	
June 12	"Big Love"	Pete Heller	"Livin' La Vida Loca"	Ricky Martin	
June 19	"Big Love"	Pete Heller	"Livin' La Vida Loca"	Ricky Martin	
June 26	"Big Love"	Pete Heller	"If You Had My Love"	Jennifer Lopez	
July 3	"Sing It Back"	Moloko	"If You Had My Love"	Jennifer Lopez	
July 10	"Sing It Back"	Moloko	"If You Had My Love"	Jennifer Lopez	
July 17	"What You Need"	Powerhouse featuring Duane Harden	"If You Had My Love"	Jennifer Lopez	
July 24	"Beautiful Stranger"	Madonna	"If You Had My Love"	Jennifer Lopez	
July 31	"Beautiful Stranger"	Madonna	"If You Had My Love"	Jennifer Lopez	
August 7	"I Will Go with You (Con te partirò)"	Donna Summer	"I Will Go with You (Con te partirò)"	Donna Summer	
August 14	"Red Alert"	Basement Jaxx	"Sexual (Li Da Di)"	Amber	
August 21	"Bailamos"	Enrique Iglesias	"Sexual (Li Da Di)"	Amber	
August 28	"My Love Is Your Love"	Whitney Houston	"Sexual (Li Da Di)"	Amber	
September 4	"My Love Is Your Love"	Whitney Houston	"Sexual (Li Da Di)"	Amber	
September 11	"Canned Heat"	Jamiroquai	"Sexual (Li Da Di)"	Amber	
September 18	"Five Fathoms (Love More)"	Everything but the Girl	"My Love Is Your Love"	Whitney Houston	
September 25	"Walking"	Pocket Size	"My Love Is Your Love"	Whitney Houston	
October 2	"All or Nothing"	Cher	"I Need To Know"	Marc Anthony	
October 9	"Situation '99"	Yazoo	"Heartbreaker"	Mariah Carey Featuring Jay-Z	
October 16	"Situation '99"	Yazoo	"Heartbreaker"	Mariah Carey Featuring Jay-Z	
October 23	"Situation '99"	Yazoo	"Heartbreaker"	Mariah Carey Featuring Jay-Z	
October 30	"Waiting for Tonight"	Jennifer Lopez	"Heartbreaker"	Mariah Carey Featuring Jay-Z	
November 6	"That's the Way Love Is"	Byron Stingily	"Heartbreaker"	Mariah Carey Featuring Jay-Z	
November 13	"Love Is the Healer"	Donna Summer	"Heartbreaker"	Mariah Carey Featuring Jay-Z	
November 20	"Sun Is Shining"	Bob Marley vs. Funkstar De Luxe	"Heartbreaker"	Mariah Carey Featuring Jay-Z	
November 27	"Sun Is Shining"	Bob Marley vs. Funkstar De Luxe	"Heartbreaker"	Mariah Carey Featuring Jay-Z	
December 4	"New York City Boy"	Pet Shop Boys	"Sexual (Li Da Di)"	Amber	
December 11	"Rendez-Vu"	Basement Jaxx	"Sexual (Li Da Di)"	Amber	
December 18	"Get Get Down"	Paul Johnson	"Sexual (Li Da Di)"	Amber	
December 25	"17 Again"	Eurythmics	"Sexual (Li Da Di)"	Amber	

== See also ==
- 1999 in music
- List of Billboard Hot 100 number ones of 1999
