= Paul Johnson (producer) =

American house DJ and producer (1971–2021)

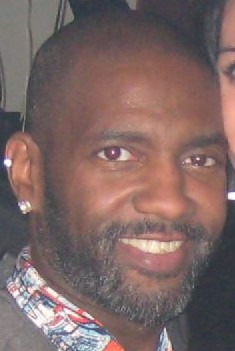
- Johnson in 2008

Background information
- Also known as: Darien's; Dat Niga Tha Schit; The P.J. Project; Pilly P.; Pjay; Yonkapin
- Born: Paul Leighton Johnson; January 11, 1971; Chicago, Illinois, U.S.
- Died: August 4, 2021 (aged 50) Evergreen Park, Illinois, U.S.
- Genres: House, electronic
- Years active: 1990–2021
- Labels: Peacefrog; Cajual; Relief; Dance Mania; Crydamoure

Paul Leighton Johnson (January 11, 1971 – August 4, 2021) was an American house disc jockey and record producer. He was known for his self-taught DJ style of house music, mentoring and inspiring younger producers, and for a series of singles, including his 1999 worldwide hit single "Get Get Down".

== Musical career ==
Johnson first began DJing in Chicago in 1984 when he was 13, throwing his first party at his eighth grade graduation. He started working as a producer in 1987, doing tracks for Chicago house labels Dance Mania, Relief, Cajual, Nite Life, Undaground Therapy, Defected, DJax Up Beats, Peacefrog, and Moody. His song "Get Get Down", while not a critical hit, was a commercial success, peaking within the top ten of the charts in Belgium (Wallonia), France, Greece, the Netherlands, and the United Kingdom. The song reached number-one on the Billboard Hot Dance Club Play chart in December 1999. In 1997, Johnson and his partner Radek started the Chicago house label Dust Traxx, and had worked with Robert Armani under the name Traxmen and with Gant Garrard as Brother 2 Brother. His 2004 track, "Follow This Beat", hit No. 8 on the US Dance chart.

Johnson's productions had a particular distinctive sound—his tracks "stood out—they were as tuneful as they were pummeling, reckless battering rams that made you want to sing along even as they bowled you over". As described by one journalist,

Paul Johnson's signature meld of disco loops, overdriven kicks and unfiltered sleaze was nothing short of alchemy. Even when chopping up the vocals of Leroy Burgess or Roy Ayers, Johnson's records simmered with raucous charisma.

Paul Johnson is the first name mentioned in the Daft Punk song "Teachers", a tribute to several of Guy-Manuel de Homem-Christo and Thomas Bangalter's house music influences. The three became friends in 1995, with the French duo personally telling Johnson that he "was one of the reasons they started to make house", something Johnson described as "pretty damn touching".

== Personal life and death ==
In 1987, Johnson was injured by a stray bullet and paralyzed from the waist down. After further health complications and a motor vehicle accident, he had one leg amputated in 2003, and the other in 2010. Johnson spoke about the difficulty of managing his chronic health conditions while being an active DJ and producer.

Johnson was known for a "big personality", "ribald" sense of humor, "mischievousness" and having "stories for days". In his later life he was noted for his active and unfiltered social media presence. In 2021, he spoke about the lack of representation and opportunity for black producers in clubs and the house music community.

In mid-2021, Johnson contracted COVID-19 and was hospitalized in Evergreen Park, Illinois. After an extended illness, he died on August 4, 2021, at the age of 50.

== Discography ==
- Psycho Kong (Djax-Up-Beats, 1994)
- Bump Talkin (Peacefrog, 1995)
- Second Coming (ACV, 1996)
- The Other Side of Me (Relief, 1996)
- Feel the Music (Peacefrog, 1996)
- We Can Make The World Spin (Nite Life, 1998)
- The Groove I Have (Moody, 1999)
- In Motion, Vol. 3 (Distance, 1999)
- Mix Connection, Vol. 1 (Wagram, 2004)

== See also ==
- Number-one dance hits of 1999 (USA)
- List of artists who reached number one on the U.S. dance chart
