= Holy Land (Liverpool) =

Area of Dingle, Liverpool

Coordinates: 53.384°N 2.966°W

The Holy Land is an area of Dingle, Liverpool, composed of several streets with streets named after prophets, including Moses Street, Isaac Street, Jacob Street and David Street. At the end of the 19th century, it was observed that there still existed similarly named places including a farm named Jericho, a stream named Jordan and landmarks called David's Throne and Adam's Battery. Some attribute the name to the population of Nonconformists in the region in the early 17th century.

Many homes on the streets are Victorian terraced houses.
