= Promised Land (CBC Radio One) =

Promised Land is a CBC Radio One program about refugees to Canada that first ran in the summer of 2010. It was presented by Natasha Fatah.

== Format ==
Promised Land features interviews with refugees to Canada who have gone through, in the words of the show's presenter Natasha Fatah, "an escape that starts anywhere in the world but always ends in Canada". The interviewee is introduced by Fatah, who briefly outlines the refugee's story and allows them to tell it. The refugee's story is interspersed by clarifying comments by Fatah to fill in gaps caused by omissions in the recorded story. Finally, once the refugee's interview is finished, Fatah makes concluding remarks and outlines the plot of next week's program.

Ten instalments of Promised Land aired between June and August 2010, with shows premiering Monday evenings at 7:30pm at each station's local time (8:00pm Newfoundland Time), repeating on Friday mornings at 9:30am (10:00am Newfoundland Time). The show was broadcast on Sirius Satellite Radio Channel 137 on Mondays at 6:30pm and 10:20pm Eastern Time (ET) and on Fridays at 8:30am and 12:30pm ET.

== Production ==
Promised Land was produced by CBC Radio One producers Natasha Fatah, Mark Ulster and Dagna Pielaszkiewicz. Fatah's own family escaped from Pakistan to move to Toronto in 2002. The 10-part documentary series was released in CD format for sale online, although all ten episodes are available to download as a podcast from iTunes or the CBC web site. Fatah, the presenter and interviewer, claims to have had to stop recording her interviews on a couple of occasions because she had started crying in response to her interviewees' stories.

== Episodes ==
No.	Title	Show guest	Home country	Original release date
1	"Escape from Vietnam"	Uyen Vu	Vietnam	June 28, 2010
2	"Escape from Iran"	Shahram Tabe	Iran	July 5, 2010
3	"Escape from Czechoslovakia"	Alino, Eva and Miso Baranik	Czechoslovak Socialist Republic	July 12, 2010
4	"Escape from Argentina"	Alberto Lalli	Argentina	July 19, 2010
5	"Escape from Uganda"	Anwer Omar	Uganda	July 26, 2010
6	"Escape from the USA"	Gary Hoag	United States	August 5, 2010
7	"Escape from the Eritrea"	Aaron Berhane	Eritrea	August 12, 2010
8	"Escape from Honduras"	Nora Lopez	Honduras	August 16, 2010
9	"Escape from Ethiopia"	Daniel Biru	Ethiopia	August 23, 2010
10	"Escape from the Holocaust"	Max Eisen	Occupied Czechoslovakia	August 30, 2010

== Reception ==
Despite receiving few reviews, Promised Land was well received by critics. Elisabeth Mahoney from The Guardian praised the show, writing, "[The interviews] make gripping radio. These well-produced half-hour shows are driven by stories that cannot help but be dramatic, and are assembled to heighten that using archive news clips, music (especially for the most terrifying moments of the escape) and, most crucially, voice."
