= Drum! =

American educational drumming magazine

- Categories: Music
- First issue: September 1991
- Company: String Letter Publishing
- Country: United States
- Language: English
- Website: www.drummagazine.com
- ISSN: 1097-0614

Drum! is an American educational drumming magazine. It features artist profiles, product reviews, lessons and advanced transcriptions covering rock, pop and related styles of music. The magazine was launched in 1991 with Andy Doerschuk as editor. In the 1990s it gained a reputation for its coverage of younger drummers in contemporary styles such as punk, rap-rock, and metal.

== Contents ==
A typical issue of Drum! includes artist features and in-depth stories on topics such as playing techniques or new products. Additionally, it includes reviews of new recordings and drum products (cymbals, drums, hardware), short news items, career and health tips, and challenging lessons. The magazine has an annual readers poll award, the Drummies. Voting takes place from February to April each year, and the winners are announced in the summer months.

== History ==
The magazine was started by Andy Doerschuk, Phil Hood, and Connie Hood in 1991. The first issue appeared in September 1991, with Charlie Benante of the band Anthrax and session drummer Joe Franco on the cover. At the time it was a tabloid-sized magazine that was distributed free musical equipment stores and record shops within California. In 1996 the magazine converted to a conventional glossy format and began global distribution. Today it is available in 24 countries worldwide, with more than 90 percent of copies going to Canada, Australia and the U.S.

Prior to starting Drum!, Andy Doerschuk was the founding editor of Drums & Drumming Magazine, a short-lived publication that was part of GPI/Miller Freeman, the publishers of Guitar Player, Bass Player and other magazines in the late '80s and early '90s. Phil Hood also worked at GPI and was the publisher of Drums & Drumming and EQ magazines. Previously, he had been the editor of Frets, an acoustic music magazine. Drums & Drumming was shuttered by GPI during the 1991 recession. The assets of the magazine were sold to Modern Drummer, a competing publication. At that point, Doerschuk and Hood decided to start their own magazine.

Effective 1 November 2016, Drum! was purchased by Stringletter, a media company headquartered in Point Richmond, California that also owns other brands including Acoustic Guitar. In November 2019, 180Drums magazine acquired Drum!.
