= I Got My Education =

Single by Uncanny Alliance

from the album The Groove Won't Bite
- Released: 1992
- Genre: Dance
- Label: A&M Records
- Songwriters: David Cole; Orville Brimsley Adams
- Producers: Manny Lehman; Mark Mazzetti

Uncanny Alliance singles chronology
| "I Got My Education" (1992) | "I'm Beautiful Dammitt!" (1993) |

"I Got My Education" is the first single released from American house music duo Uncanny Alliance's LP, The Groove Won't Bite (1994), released as a CD single and 12". The song went to number two for two weeks on the US dance chart and also reached the Top 40 of the UK Singles Chart.

The song, which is said to be a response to the Crystal Waters track "Gypsy Woman (She's Homeless)", mostly consists of spoken word vocal samples performed by lead singer/vocalist E.V. Mystique. She is speaking to an unidentified female character who has apparently lost her job after giving her boss a bad attitude, resulting in homelessness. The song has a high camp value and was very popular in gay dance clubs. A sample lyric: "Attitude, attitude was all she sent/Now she can't afford antiperspirant/Books and school just give you the blues/But oh, dear girl, where are your shoes?"

The single was first released as a white label 12" vinyl single given out to club DJ's. The song became so popular that record labels began vying to sign the band. During this process, the single was heavily bootlegged and sold by unscrupulous individuals who obtained the promotional white label single. As a result, when it was finally released by A&M records on an official 12" and CD single, a new version entitled "Bootleggers Response" was included as a b-side. In this version the theme of the song is changed to address the actual bootlegger, accusing him of being forced to make money by bootlegging because he didn't get an education. A sample lyrics: "Are you a person with morals or couth who brushes their teeth in the morning?/Do you even have teeth?/Maybe with the money you made from the bootleg you can go and buy yourself...*A* tooth."

A music video was produced featuring Mystique portraying both herself and the "Miss Thing" subject of the lyrics. It takes place primarily in a classroom setting and parodies several other videos including "Mediate" by INXS and "People Are Still Having Sex" by LaTour.

== Charts ==
| Chart (1992) | Peak position |
|---|---|
| UK Singles (OCC) | 39 |
| UK Airplay (Music Week) | 19 |
| UK Dance (Music Week) | 3 |
| UK Club Chart (Music Week) | 3 |
| US Hot Dance Club Play (Billboard) | 2 |
| US Maxi-Singles Sales (Billboard) | 12 |
