= Scott Steen =

American trumpeter

Scott Steen is an American trumpeter.

Steen was a longtime member of the Royal Crown Revue known for The Mask. He has recorded the soundtrack to “Swingers”, performed with Cirque du Soleil, and has toured with the cast of the musical West Side Story as lead trumpeter. Steen was described as “a chameleon” by All About Jazz for his ability to play convincingly in many styles, including bop, avant-garde, blues, and boogaloo. He has performed all over globe from New York to Sydney and Montreal to Moscow.

He was the featured trumpeter with Royal Crown Revue and for Bette Midler during her Kiss My Brass tour 2003–2005. He has also performed with Brian Setzer, Mark Whitfield, Sherman Ferguson, Phil Upchurch, and Stewart Copeland.

In addition to his recordings with other groups his solo CDs include Makin’ Time and Playing Favorites. His solo project “Remembering Miles“, is a tribute to trumpeter Miles Davis, with backing from Matteo Alfonso on piano, Simone Serafini on bass, and Tommaso Cappellato on Drums during his time living in Italy.

Steen most recently was brought on to consult for an upcoming film with Jack Huston.

== Festival appearances ==
Playboy, Hollywood Bowl; Newport Jazz; JVC, NY; JVC, Saratoga; Mt. Hood, OR;Berks, PA; Boston, MA; Reading, England; Gaildorf, Germany; Viel Jazz, Switzerland; Roskilde, Denmark; Tantsy, Moscow; Playboy, Pasadena; Newport Beach, CA; Postojna Jazz, Slovenia; Lake Como, Italy; Parco Delta, Italy; Bologna, Jazz nella Piazza, Italy; Sibenik, Croatia; Gyor Blues, Hungary; Varazdin, Croatia

== Media appearances ==
The Mask, Buffy the Vampire Slayer, Jay Leno, Conan O’Brien, Ellen DeGeneres, Good Morning America, CNN, CBS World News, Good News Australia. Comedy Central, BBC3, All Things Considered (recorded a version of the show's theme), PBS
