= Holiest sites in Islam (disambiguation) =

Holiest sites in Islam may refer to:

- Holiest sites in Islam
- Holiest sites in Sunni Islam
- Holiest sites in Shia Islam
