= Uncanny Alliance =

Uncanny Alliance was an American house music duo. They consisted of the producer, Brinsley Evans, and the female vocalist E.V. Mystique, who were both from New York City.

== Career ==
They first gained attention when their song "I Got My Education", which was released to the nightclubs in 1992. The track was a response song to Crystal Waters' effort, "Gypsy Woman (She's Homeless)". After the song became popular in the clubs, several record labels got into a bidding war to sign them. They ultimately signed a recording contract with A&M Records, and in 1994, their album, The Groove Won't Bite was released. "I Got My Education" also reached No. 39 in the UK Singles Chart in December 1992. Aside from "I Got My Education", the album did spawn one additional hit, "I'm Beautiful Dammitt!". It was later covered to greater success by Bette Midler on her Bathhouse Betty album, reaching No. 1 on the US dance chart and No. 60 on the Billboard Hot 100. Evans also co-produced the Midler version.

During the period when they were choosing a record label, "I Got My Education" was heavily bootlegged, causing a new single with "Bootlegger Response" remixes to be released. The chorus was changed from "I Got My Education" to "Illegal Duplication."

The band has subsequently dropped out of sight, with no additional recordings.

Their song, "Happy Day", can be heard in the movie Happy Gilmore, starring Adam Sandler.

== Discography ==
=== Albums ===
- The Groove Won't Bite (1994)

=== Singles ===
- "I Got My Education" (1992)
- "I'm Beautiful Dammitt!" (1993)
- "Everybody Up" (1994)
- "Happy Day" (1994)
