= I'm Beautiful Dammitt! =

1993 single by Uncanny Alliance

Single by Uncanny Alliance

from the album The Groove Won't Bite
- Released: 1993
- Genre: Dance
- Label: A&M Records
- Songwriter: Orville Brimsley Adams
- Producers: Manny Lehman; Mark Mazzetti

Uncanny Alliance singles chronology
"I Got My Education" (1992)	"I'm Beautiful Dammitt!" (1993)	"Everybody Up" (1994)

"I'm Beautiful Dammitt!" (sometimes printed without punctuation, sometimes simply titled "I'm Beautiful") is the second single released from the Uncanny Alliance LP, The Groove Won't Bite, released as a CD single and 12".

== Versions and remixes ==
- «I’m Beautiful Dammitt!» (Club Vocal) — 7:41
- «I’m Beautiful Dammitt!» (Fierce Dub) — 6:09
- «I’m Beautiful Dammitt!» (Radio Version) — 3:41
- «I’m Beautiful Dammitt!» (Radio Club Mix) — 4:21
- «I’m Beautiful Dammitt!» (DJ EFX's San Tranzdisko Mix) — 11:35
- «I’m Beautiful Dammitt!» (3rd Floor's Vox Mix)
- «I’m Beautiful Dammitt!» (Digi Dubb Mix)
- «I’m Beautiful Dammitt!» (Urban Instrumental)
- «I’m Beautiful Dammitt!» (I Got A Job Mix)
- «I’m Beautiful Dammitt!» (3rd Floor Mix)

== Charts ==
Chart (1994)	Peak Position
US Dance Club Songs (Billboard)	4
US Dance Singles Sales (Billboard)	40

== Bette Midler version ==
"I'm Beautiful"

Single by Bette Midler

from the album Bathhouse Betty
- Released: 1999
- Genre: Dance
- Label: Warner Bros. Records
- Songwriter: Orville Brimsley Adams
- Producers: Manny Lehman; Mark Mazzetti; Bette Midler

Bette Midler singles chronology
"My One True Friend" (1998)	"I'm Beautiful" (1999)	"In These Shoes" (2001)

In 1998 singer Bette Midler covered the song, retitled simply "I'm Beautiful", for her album Bathhouse Betty. That album, the title of which references her time as a performer in gay bathhouses, was catered to the gay community. As such she revised the lyrics to the song to be more specifically directed towards the struggle of gay people to be accepted. In particular there is the new lyric: "'Go away little boy' all the kids say! Everybody on the block says they think you're gay!" The song was released as a single in 1999 with numerous dance remixes, one of which reached #1 on the U.S. Hot Dance Club Play Chart, and #8 on the Hot Dance Music/Maxi Singles Sales.

=== Track listing ===
12": USA (Warner Bros 0–44586)

1. "I'm Beautiful" (Danny Tenaglia Continental Club Mix)
2. "I'm Beautiful" (Brinsley Evans Back To The Scene Of The Crime Mix)
3. "I'm Beautiful" (Victor Calderone Main Vocal Mix)
4. "I'm Beautiful" (Album Version)
5. "I'm Beautiful" (Danny's D-Tour Dub)
6. "I'm Beautiful" (Lil' D-Tour Groove)
7. "I'm Beautiful" (Victor Calderone Dub)
8. "I'm Beautiful" (Victor Calderone Drum Dub)

CDM: USA (Warner 2–44586)

1. "I'm Beautiful" (Album Version)
2. "I'm Beautiful" (Danny Tenaglia Continental Club Mix)
3. "I'm Beautiful" (Victor Calderone Main Vocal Mix)
4. "I'm Beautiful" (Brinsley Evans Back To The Scene Of The Crime Mix)
5. "I'm Beautiful" (Danny's D-Tour Dub)
6. "I'm Beautiful" (Victor Calderone Dub)
7. "I'm Beautiful" (Lil' D-Tour Groove)
8. "I'm Beautiful" (Victor Calderone Drum Dub)

12": USA (Warner PRO-A-9587) Promo

1. "I'm Beautiful" (Victor Calderone Main Vocal Mix)
2. "I'm Beautiful" (Victor Calderone Dub)
3. "I'm Beautiful" (Victor Calderone Drum Dub)

12": USA (Warner PRO-A-9591) Promo

1. "I'm Beautiful" (Danny Tenaglia Continental Club Mix)
2. "I'm Beautiful" (Brinsley Evans Back To The Scene Of The Crime Mix)
3. "I'm Beautiful" (Danny's D-Tour Dub)
4. "I'm Beautiful" (Lil' D-Tour Groove)

12": USA (Warner) Promo

1. "I'm Beautiful" (Danny Tenaglia Continental Club Mix)
2. "I'm Beautiful" (Danny's D-Tour Dub)
3. "I'm Beautiful" (Victor Calderone Main Vocal Mix)
4. "I'm Beautiful" (Victor Calderone Dub)
5. "I'm Beautiful" (Brinsley Evans Back To The Scene Of The Crime Mix)

=== Charts ===
Chart (1999)	Peak position
US Dance Club Songs (Billboard)	1
US Dance Singles Sales (Billboard)	8

== See also ==
- List of number-one dance singles of 1999 (U.S.)
