= Royal Crown Revue =

American swing revival band formed 1989

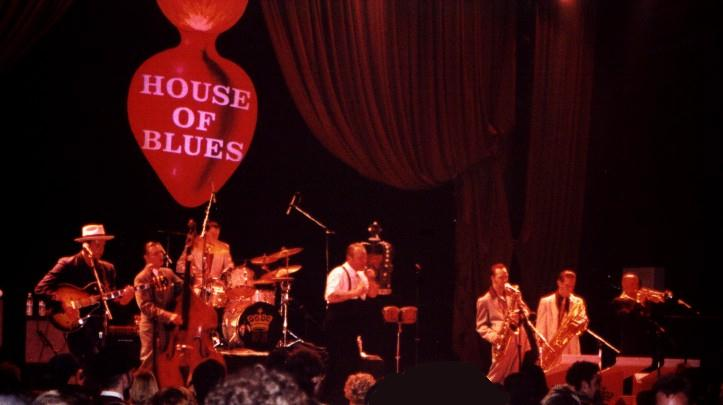

Background information
- Origin: Los Angeles
- Genres: Swing; jump blues
- Labels: BYO, Surfdog, Warner Bros.
- Past members: James Achor; Mark Cally; Mando Dorame; Daniel Glass; Jim Jedeikin; Jennifer Keith; Veikko Lepisto; Dave Miller; Eddie Nichols; Scott Steen; Adam Stern; Jamie Stern; Mark Stern; Bill Ungerman; Enrico Crivellaro

Royal Crown Revue was a band formed in 1989 in Los Angeles, California. They have been credited with starting the swing revival movement.

== Career ==
The band contained Mark and Adam Stern from the hardcore punk band Youth Brigade. Other members included Daniel Glass, Scott Steen, James Achor, Veikko Lepisto, Bill Ungerman, and Eddie Nichols.

After appearing in the movie The Mask, Royal Crown Revue began a residency at the Derby in Los Angeles.

== Discography ==
- Kings of Gangster Bop (Big Daddy, 1991)
- Hollywood Tales (1994)
- Mugzy's Move (Warner Bros., 1995)
- Caught in the Act (Surfdog, 1997)
- The Contender (Warner Bros., 1998)
- Walk On Fire (SideOneDummy, 1999)
- Passport to Australia (2001)
