= The Promised Land (New York Undercover) =

- New York Undercover episode
- Episode no.: Season 3 Episode 17
- Directed by: Don Kurt
- Written by: Reggie Rock Bythewood
- Production code: K1519
- Original air date: February 20, 1997

Episode chronology
← Previous "Outrage"	Next → "Descell"

"The Promised Land" is an episode from the police drama television series New York Undercover, and was first broadcast on February 20, 1997, on Fox. Written by Reggie Rock Bythewood and directed by Don Kurt, it is the 17th episode of the third season, and the 69th episode of the series.

In the episode, the primary characters undercover evidence of a governmental conspiracy in the 1968 assassination of civil rights leader Martin Luther King Jr. While the events depicted in the episode are fictional, they reflect suspicions and beliefs held by a number of people regarding the true circumstances surrounding Dr. King's death.

== Background ==
In 1969, James Earl Ray was convicted of first-degree murder in the assassination of Martin Luther King Jr. after confessing and pleading guilty. He was sentenced to 99 years in prison. He would later recant the confession and proclaim his innocence. Ray died in prison on April 23, 1998, at the age of 70, from complications related to kidney disease and liver failure caused by hepatitis C.

== Plot ==
The following message appears on the screen at the beginning of the episode: "Almost 30 years after the assassination of Dr. Martin Luther King Jr., a Tennessee court has agreed to hear arguments to re-open the investigation of his murder."

The episode opens with a montage of footage from Dr. King's career, highlighted by an excerpt from his final speech, "I've Been to the Mountaintop". The clips are interspersed with dramatized scenes featuring FBI agents who have apparently bugged Dr. King's telephone and hotel room. One of the men brandishes a rifle similar to the one used to assassinate Dr. King. Playing in the background during the montage is Marvin Gaye's rendition of "The Star-Spangled Banner".

In New York City, a man races out of the northern end of Central Park, desperate to avoid a gunman's bullet. He darts into the street and is struck by a taxi. The driver gets out and helps the man to his feet, but is shot by the unseen gunman. The other man jumps in the taxi and flees. Shortly thereafter, NYPD detectives J.C. Williams (Malik Yoba), Eddie Torres (Michael DeLorenzo), Nina Moreno (Lauren Vélez) and Tommy McNamara (Jonathan LaPaglia) investigate the shooting. The mystery man contacts J.C. by telephone and they meet at a clandestine location. The man gives J.C. a key to a locker at Penn Station and leaves. J.C. retrieves the contents, unaware that he is being watched and photographed.

In Washington, D.C., a government official becomes concerned about J.C.'s involvement with the mystery man, whose name is Reynolds. They send an officer from the 20th Special Forces Group to New York to deal with the police detective. The officer arrives at J.C.'s apartment, and the detective is stunned to see that he is Colonel Williams (Roger Robinson) -- his father. J.C. is furious at the man, who abandoned him and his mother 17 years earlier when J.C. was only 12. As J.C. is in the process of throwing his father out, his son Gregory (George O. Gore II) emerges from the bedroom, briefly meeting the grandfather he never knew he had.

The package from the locker turns out to be a floppy disk from the FBI. Bernard—one of J.C. and Eddie's associates—gains access to the file on the disk, intended only for the eyes of the Chairman of the Joint Chiefs of Staff and FBI special agents. The file details "Operation Garden Plot", a top secret FBI program from March 1968. Garden Plot was a directive to terminate "terrorists" on American soil. "Containment of Zorro" is imperative, according to the directive. "Containment" is clearly a euphemism for killing, while "Zorro" is a codename for some unknown party.

J.C. arrives to pick up Gregory from school, and is angered to see Col. Williams there, trying to become acquainted with the boy. The two men agree to meet later. Meanwhile, Eddie learns that Garden Plot was part of COINTELPRO, the U.S. government's 1960s-era counterintelligence program to destroy so-called revolutionary Black organizations, including the Black Panther Party, the Southern Christian Leadership Conference and the Nation of Islam. He and J.C. surmise that "Zorro" is actually Dr. King, who died in April 1968. Eddie also reveals that, according to the file, there is a second disk containing the names of everyone involved in Operation Garden Plot—which they now realize was a conspiracy to assassinate Dr. King.

Reynolds contacts J.C. and sets up another meeting. Concerned about the dangerous tone that the case has taken, J.C. takes Gregory to stay with the boy's mother Chantal Tierney (Fatima Faloye). He later meets his father at Natalie's, and is shocked when the colonel asks for the computer disk. J.C. denies knowing anything about the disk and accuses his father of returning only because his superiors ordered him to do so. The colonel states that he does not care about J.C.'s hurt feelings as much as he cares about the disk, and tells J.C. that he is making a big mistake by not relinquishing the disk. The next day, J.C. and Eddie meet with Reynolds, a former FBI agent. He states that the boarding house room from which James Earl Ray allegedly shot Dr. King was actually rented by another man. Further, he contends that Grace—the elderly witness who allegedly saw Ray running away after the shooting—described a different man before she was whisked away to a mental institution, where she eventually died. Reynolds gives them the names of two individuals that may be in possession of the second disk, but the men are suddenly surprised by three FBI agents, who force then to drop their weapons. One of the agents then takes J.C.'s gun and shoots Reynolds, killing him. Amazingly, J.C. and Eddie are able to flee, but realize that they have been framed for murder—and that retrieving both disks may be their only way to clear themselves.

NYPD Lt. Virginia Cooper (Patti D'Arbanville-Quinn) urges Nina and Tommy to find J.C. and Eddie before a "trigger-happy" officer does first. The fugitives manage to get a message to Nina. She and Tommy meet them at Pier 17, and are brought up to speed. Meanwhile, at Chantal's apartment, Col. Williams questions Gregory in an effort to find J.C. When the colonel becomes too agitated, Chantal throws him out. Tommy locates Luther Johnson, one of the men believed to have information about the second disk, but he states that he never received it. J.C. and Eddie travel to Greater Washington, D.C. to meet Randall Greene, the other man Reynolds mentioned. Greene turns out to be a former FBI agent, and he explains that then-FBI Director J. Edgar Hoover wanted Dr. King dead because he had the power to bring Blacks and Whites together—something many people feared at the time, including Greene himself. He states that he knows who has the second disk, and that they will give it to J.C. and Eddie back in New York. Meanwhile, the rogue FBI agents locate and murder Bernard.

Col. Williams visits Gregory at his school, and makes peace with his grandson after answering some very difficult questions. Meanwhile, Tuckett (the highest-ranking surviving FBI agent from Garden Plot) interrogates his former comrade Randall Greene. The man refuses to talk, defiantly quoting the final words of Dr. King's "I've Been to the Mountaintop" speech. Nevertheless, Tuckett locates enough information in the man's home to track down J.C. and Eddie, and kills Greene. Later in New York at Soldiers Memorial Park, J.C. and Eddie are confronted by the rogue agents. Eddie is shot at close range, and J.C. relinquishes the first disk to save his life. The two detectives are about to be killed when the rogue agents are shot from a distance—by Col. Williams. Eddie is unscathed, thanks to his bulletproof vest. Although the whereabouts of the second disk remain a mystery, the colonel promises to leak enough of the truth to clear the detectives' names. Further, he assures J.C. that he will stay in touch, and the two men share an emotional embrace. Later, J.C. and Gregory watch a TV news report stating that James Earl Ray has been granted a new hearing, based in part upon new evidence which has emerged from "an anonymous source" implying a conspiracy in Dr. King's assassination.

== Guest appearances ==
Folk singer Richie Havens appears as himself, performing a rendition of "God Bless the Child", a jazz standard customarily associated with singer Billie Holiday. Fox 5 New York TV reporter Rosanna Scotto also appears as herself.
