= Modern Drummer =

Magazine for drummers and percussionists

- Neil Peart on the February 1994 cover
- Categories: Music
- Frequency: Monthly
- Publisher: David Frangioni
- Founder: Ron Spagnardi
- First issue: January 1977
- Company: Modern Drummer Publications
- Country: United States
- Based in: Boca Raton, Florida, U.S.
- Language: English
- Website: moderndrummer.com
- ISSN: 0194-4533

Modern Drummer is an American monthly publication targeting the interests of drummers and percussionists. The magazine features interviews, equipment reviews, columns offering advice on technique, and information for the general public. Modern Drummer is also available on the internet. The publication is based in Boca Raton, Florida.

First published in 1977, today the print version of Modern Drummer is available in 67 countries. The monthly digital edition, enhanced with music and videos corresponding to the current issue's contents, is available on the internet. An electronic newsletter featuring unique editorial, MD Wire, is also published monthly. A corresponding website is used to supplement the magazine with blogs and other items which cannot be provided in the paper format, such as audio-video presentations.

In 1993, Modern Drummer Publications introduced a bimonthly drum dealer-oriented magazine called Drum Business, and for more than 20 years its book division has released works by drum educators. In 2006 the company published its first hardcover book on the history of drumming, entitled The Drummer: 100 Years Of Rhythmic Power And Invention. Since 1987 it has also produced the Modern Drummer Festival.

== History ==
Modern Drummer magazine was conceived in the basement of Ron and Isabel Spagnardi's home in Nutley, New Jersey, funded only with the family's personal savings. The magazine's initial staff consisted of Leo Spagnardi (Ron's father, who taught him how to play the drums), and Ron and Isabel's daughter, Lori. Although they had no real publication experience or financial backing, the Spagnardis placed ads in local newspapers, in Downbeat, and in Drum World.

"What we didn't consider when we put the ads in the papers," recalled Isabel in The Drummer, "was that we were innocently breaking the law by advertising a product that didn't even exist yet!" The ads worked, however, and subscriptions began coming in as the first issue was still being laid out on the Spagnardis' ping-pong table. Ron contributed most of the magazine's content, writing the majority of the articles on an old typewriter under various pen names. Within two years, the Spagnardis' basement could no longer provide the necessary space and so moved to its first proper office in Clifton, New Jersey. By 1984, the magazine once again outgrew its headquarters and moved to a larger facility in Cedar Grove, New Jersey. Ten years later, it moved to an even larger facility in the same town. The publication is now based in Boca Raton, Florida.

Ron Spagnardi died on September 22, 2003. David Frangioni became Publisher in 2019 and then CEO/Owner in 2020.

== Drum Business and book publishing ==
In 1993 Modern Drummer Publications introduced Drum Business, a magazine dedicated to the needs of drum retailers. The bi-monthly publication features interviews with drum sellers, press releases for new products, drum-industry news, articles and news such as on the annual National Association of Merchant Musicians (NAMM) convention.

Among the books Modern Drummer Publications has released are titles by well-known drummers such as Gary Chester, Carl Palmer and Bill Bruford. Ron Spagnardi authored more than a dozen books.

== Readers poll ==
Each year Modern Drummer publishes the results of its readers poll, which highlights top drummers spanning all genres of music and inducts one drummer into the Modern Drummer Hall of Fame. Awards are also given for top educational materials and recorded performances.
