= Bette Midler discography =

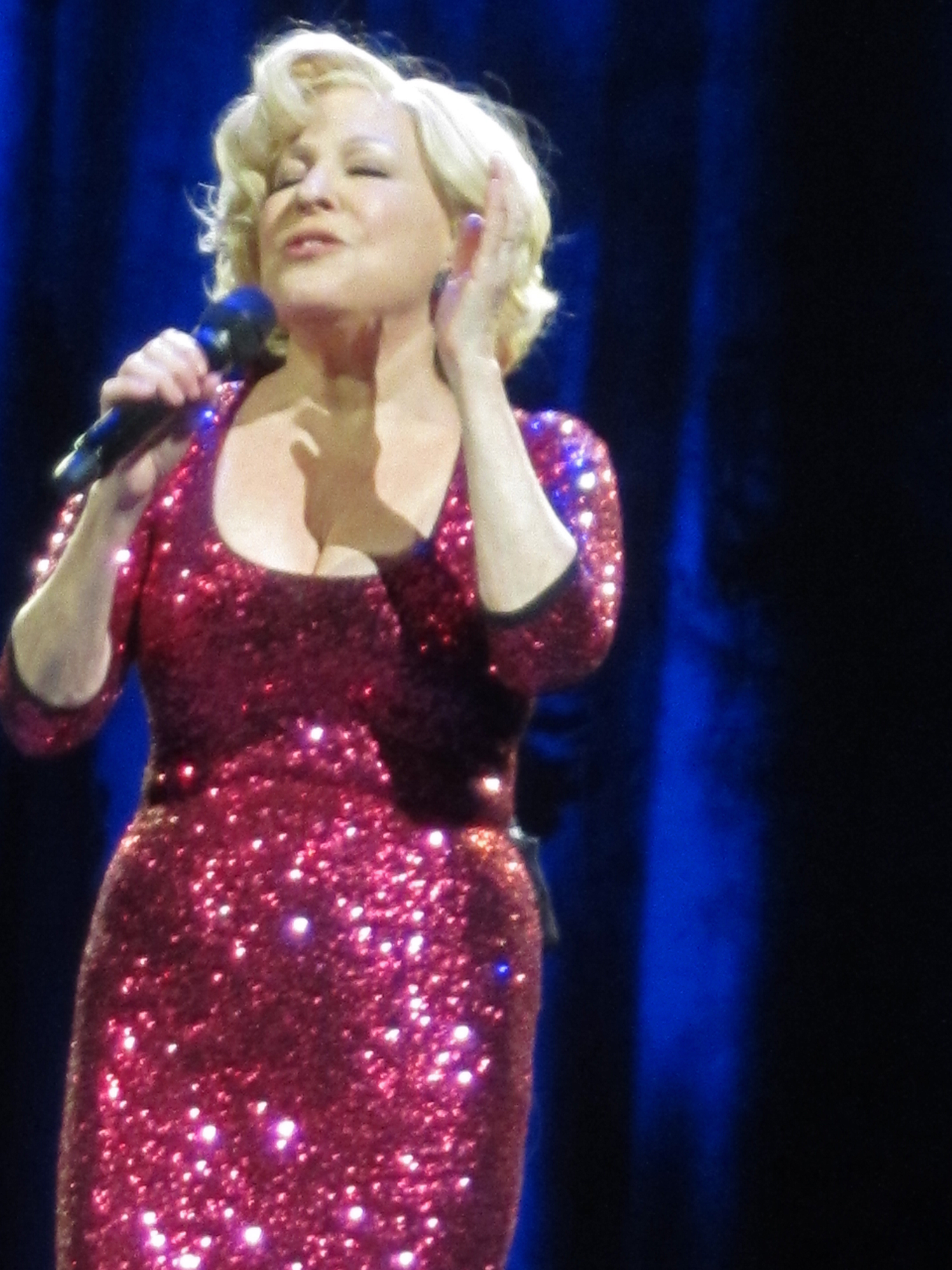
- Midler performing in 2015
- Studio albums: 14
- Soundtrack albums: 4
- Live albums: 4
- Compilation albums: 7
- Singles: 39
- Video albums: 4
- Music videos: 11
- Box sets: 2
- Spoken word albums: 1
- Promotional singles: 9
- Other appearances: 10
- Unreleased songs: 3

American singer Bette Midler has released 13 studio albums, four soundtrack albums, five live albums, one spoken word album, seven greatest hits compilations, four video albums, 39 official singles, nine promotional singles, and 11 music videos.

Midler released her debut single "Do You Want to Dance?" in 1972, which peaked at number 17 on the Billboard Hot 100. Her first album was released the same year, and it managed to sell over 1 million copies in United States being certified platinum by RIAA. After that she released 10 studio albums with Warner Records, the most successful is Some People's Lives, which received gold and platinum certifications in the United States, United Kingdom, Canada, Australia and New Zealand.

After nearly three decades of erratic record sales, Midler was dropped from the Warner Music Group in 2001. Following a reported long-standing feud with Barry Manilow, the two joined forces after many years in 2003 to record Bette Midler Sings the Rosemary Clooney Songbook. Now signed to Columbia Records, the album was an instant success, being certified gold by RIAA. One of the Clooney Songbook selections, "This Ole House", became Midler's first Christian radio single shipped by Rick Hendrix and his positive music movement. The album was nominated for a Grammy the following year. After that she released two more albums with Columbia Records, and in 2014 returned to Warner to release her fourteenth studio album, It's the Girls!.

As of 2010, Midler has sold over 30 million records worldwide.

== Albums ==
=== Studio albums ===
Title	Album details	Peak chart positions										Certifications
Title	Album details	US	AUS	AUT	CAN	GER	JPN	NLD	NZ	SWE	UK	Certifications
The Divine Miss M	Released: November 7, 1972; Label: Atlantic (#SD7238); Format: LP, CD (1995)	9	7	—	5	—	58	—	—	—	—	RIAA: Platinum; AUS: Platinum; MC: Platinum
Bette Midler	Released: November 16, 1973; Label: Atlantic (#SD7270); Format: LP, CD (1995)	6	14	—	3	—	—	—	—	—	—	RIAA: Gold
Songs for the New Depression	Released: January 8, 1976; Label: Atlantic (#SD18155); Format: LP, CD (1995)	27	50	—	—	—	—	—	—	—	—	
Broken Blossom	Released: November 17, 1977; Label: Atlantic (#SD19151); Format: LP, CD (1995)	51	47	—	46	—	—	—	—	—	—	
Thighs and Whispers	Released: October 1979; Label: Atlantic (#SD16004); Format: LP, CD (1995)	65	28	—	—	—	—	—	—	28	—	
No Frills	Released: August 1, 1983; Label: Atlantic (#80070); Format: LP, CD (1995)	60	43	—	71	46	—	41	—	1	—	
Some People's Lives (Note: Some People's Lives was classified as the 36th best-selling album of 1991 in Australia. In Canada, the set became the 60th most selling album in 1990, while in 1991 it scored at number 36 on the End-of-Year chart.)	Released: September 4, 1990; Label: Atlantic (#82129); Format: LP, CD	6	7	27	7	15	66	—	10	—	5	RIAA: 2× Platinum; ARIA: 2× Platinum; BPI: Gold; MC: 2× Platinum
Bette of Roses	Released: July 27, 1995; Label: Atlantic (#82823); Format: CD	45	51	—	69	74	45	—	—	—	55	RIAA: Platinum; BPI: Silver
Bathhouse Betty	Released: September 15, 1998; Label: Warner Bros (#47078); Format: CD	32	55	—	88	68	89	—	—	—	—	RIAA: Gold
Bette	Released: October 10, 2000; Label: Warner Bros (#47843); Format: CD	69	—	—	—	—	—	—	—	—	—	
Bette Midler Sings the Rosemary Clooney Songbook	Released: September 30, 2003; Label: Columbia (#CK90350); Format: CD	14	28	—	—	—	—	—	—	—	—	RIAA: Gold
Bette Midler Sings the Peggy Lee Songbook	Released: October 25, 2005; Label: Columbia (#CN97758); Format: DD (CD, DVD)	10	—	—	—	—	—	—	—	—	41	
Cool Yule (holiday album)	Released: October 10, 2006; Label: Columbia (#82876 86266); Format: CD	33	—	—	—	—	—	—	—	—	—	
It's the Girls!	Released: November 4, 2014; Label: Warner/Rhino (#545542); Format: CD	3	10	38	24	62	—	64	—	—	6	BPI: Gold
"—" denotes an album that did not chart or was not released in that region.

=== Soundtracks ===
Title	Album details	Peak chart positions										Certifications
Title	Album details	US	AUS	AUT	CAN	JPN	NLD	NZ	NOR	SWE	UK	Certifications
The Rose: The Original Soundtrack Recording	Released: December 3, 1979; Label: Atlantic (#SD16010); Format: LP, CS, CD (1995)	12	3	—	—	—	16	19	18	4	68	RIAA: 2× Platinum; ARIA: 3× Platinum
Beaches: Original Soundtrack Recording	Released: November 22, 1988; Label: Atlantic (#81933); Format: LP, CS, CD	2	1 (Note: Beaches was classified as the 8th best selling album on the Australian End-of-Year Chart for 1989.)	—	—	—	—	2	—	—	21	RIAA: 3× Platinum; ARIA: 4× Platinum; BPI: Gold
For the Boys: Music from the Motion Picture	Released: November 12, 1991; Label: Atlantic (#82329); Format: LP, CS, CD	22	44	34	28	52	—	—	—	—	75	RIAA: Gold; MC: Gold
Gypsy	Released: November 23, 1993; Label: Atlantic (#82551); Format: CD	175	—	—	—	—	—	—	—	—	—	
"—" denotes an album that did not chart or was not released in that region.

=== Live albums ===
Title	Album details	Peak chart positions		
Title	Album details	US	AUS	NZ
Live at Last	Released: June 1977; Label: Atlantic (#SD29000); Format: 2LP, 2CD (N/A)	49	39	—
Divine Madness	Released: November 7, 1980; Label: Atlantic (#SD16022); Format: LP	34	20	12

=== Spoken word albums ===
Title	Album details	Peak chart positions	
Title	Album details	US	AUS
Mud Will Be Flung Tonight	Released: 1985; Label: Atlantic (#81291); Format: LP, CD	183	94

=== Compilations ===
Title	Album details	Peak chart positions										Certifications
Title	Album details	US	AUS	AUT	CAN	GER	JPN	NLD	NZ	SWE	UK	Certifications
The Best of Bette	Released: 1978; Label: Atlantic (#50530); Format: LP, CD (1987)	—	18	—	—	—	—	—	—	32	—	ARIA: Platinum
The Best of Bette (1981)	Released: 1981; Label: K-tel (# N/A); Format: LP	—	40	—	—	—	—	—	—	—	—	
Just Hits	Released: 1987; Label: Atlantic (# N/A); Format: LP	—	97	—	—	—	—	—	—	—	—	
Experience the Divine: Greatest Hits (Note: Experience the Divine: Greatest Hits was classified as the 28th best selling album on the Australian End-of-Year Chart for 1993 and the 43rd for the year of 1994, respectively.)	Released: June 22, 1993; Label: Atlantic (#82497); Format: CS, CD (CD, re-issue 1996)	50	3	35	27	67	58	1	3	—	3	RIAA: Platinum; ARIA: 4× Platinum; BPI: Platinum; MC: Gold
Jackpot! The Best Bette (Note: Her 2008 greatest hits set was titled Jackpot! The Best Bette in the US; overseas the compilation was released under the name The Best Bette.)	Released: September 23, 2008; Label: Atlantic / Rhino (#R2515881); Format: CD (CD/DVD, UK Limited edition)	66	—	—	—	—	—	—	—	10	6	BPI: 2× Platinum
Memories of You	Released: November 22, 2010; Label: Warner / Rhino (#77186); Format: CD (only UK)	—	—	—	—	—	—	—	—	—	45	BPI: Silver
A Gift of Love	Released: December 4, 2015; Label: Warner / Rhino; Format: CD, digital download	—	46	—	—	—	—	—	—	—	25	BPI: Silver
"—" denotes an album that did not chart or was not released in that region.

=== Box sets ===
Title	Album details	Notes
Bette Midler: 3 for One	Released: April 4, 2000; Label: Atlantic (#CD BOX SET); Format: 3CD	Import release issued in Australia, featuring two studio albums: The Divine Miss M (1972) and Some People's Lives (1990), along with the soundtrack of Beaches (1988).
Original Album Series	Released: October 14, 2011; Label: Atlantic (#97547); Format: 5CD	Import release, featuring her first four albums — The Divine Miss M (1972), Bette Midler (1973), Songs for the New Depression (1976), Broken Blossom (1977) — and initial OST The Rose (1979); each in a card sleeve with original LP artwork on front and back.

== Singles ==
=== As lead artist ===
List of singles as lead artist, with selected chart positions and certifications
Title	Year	Peak chart positions										Certifications	Album
Title	Year	US	US AC	US DC	AUS	CAN AC	CAN	GER	NLD	NZ	UK	Certifications	Album
"Do You Want to Dance?" (Note: Promotional release of "Do You Want to Dance" was issued in Germany as double A-side single, along with song "Daytime Hustler".)	1972	17	8	—	10	1	18	—	—	—	—		The Divine Miss M
"Boogie Woogie Bugle Boy" (Note: "Boogie Woogie Bugle Boy" was released in Germany and Netherlands as a double A-side SP, along with "Chapel of Love".)	1973	8	1	—	7	3	8	—	—	17	—		The Divine Miss M
"Friends" (Note: The single "Friends" was issued in the UK only as a promotional single.)	1973	40	9	—	—	17	57	—	—	—	—		The Divine Miss M
"In the Mood" (Note: "In the Mood" as a double A-side single with "Drinking Again", only in France and Netherlands.)	1973	51	18	—	96	29	28	—	—	—	—		Bette Midler
"Strangers in the Night" (Note: While in the US "Strangers in the Night" was released as a double A-side single together with "Old Cape Cod", in France the single was issued with French-sung track "Samedi et Vendredi.)	1976	—	45	7	—	—	—	—	—	—	—		Songs for the New Depression
"Old Cape Cod"	1976	—	36	—	—	—	—	—	—	—	—		Songs for the New Depression
"Samedi et vendredi" (Note: "Samedi et vendredi" was issued on single only in Italy.)	1976	—	—	—	—	—	—	—	—	—	—		Songs for the New Depression
"You're Movin' Out Today"	1977	42	11	—	75	10	67	—	—	—	—		Live at Last
"Storybook Children (Daybreak)" (Note: In some countries, such as e.g. Canada and France, the song was promoted under title "Day Break (Storybook Children)".)	1977	57	37	—	—	39	56	—	—	—	—		Broken Blossom
"Buckets of Rain" (featuring Bob Dylan) (Note: "Buckets of Rain", originally released on the 1976's album Songs for the New Depression, was issued later on in the UK to support the import compilation The Best Bette.)	1978	—	—	—	—	—	—	—	—	—	—		The Best of Bette
"Married Men"	1979	40	—	32	37	—	81	—	—	—	—		Thighs and Whispers
"Hang on in There Baby" (Note: "Hang on in There Baby" was issued in the US only as a promotional single, and along with "My Knight in Black Leather" as double A-side release.)	1979	—	—	70	—	—	—	—	—	—	—		Thighs and Whispers
"My Knight in Black Leather" (Note: "My Knight in Black Leather" was released only in Germany, Scandinavian region and Australia.)	1979	—	—	70	29	—	—	—	—	—	—		Thighs and Whispers
"When a Man Loves a Woman"	1980	35	—	—	—	—	—	—	—	—	—		The Rose: The Original Soundtrack Recording
"The Rose" (Note: In French-speaking regions, "The Rose" was released as a double A-side SP with track "Stay with Me". In Canada, "The Rose" became the 9th most selling in 1980.)	1980	3	1	—	6	1	2	—	—	24	—	RIAA: Gold; BPI: Silver; RMNZ: Platinum	The Rose: The Original Soundtrack Recording
"My Mother's Eyes" (live)	1980	39	8	—	59	—	—	—	—	34	—		Divine Madness
"Chapel of Love" (live)	1980	—	—	—	—	—	—	—	—	—	—		Divine Madness
"All I Need to Know"	1983	77	39	—	—	5	—	—	—	—	—		No Frills
"Favorite Waste of Time"	1983	78	—	—	44	—	—	—	—	—	—		No Frills
"Beast of Burden"	1984	71	—	—	12	—	—	15	11	4	—		No Frills
"Under the Boardwalk"	1988	—	—	—	26	—	—	—	—	—	—		Beaches: Original Soundtrack Recording
"Wind Beneath My Wings" (Note: "Wind Beneath My Wings" also scored at number 3 on the Canadian Retail Singles and at No. 4 on Irish Singles Chart. Within End-of-Year charts, the title became the 11th best selling single of 1989 in Australia and the 31st in Canada, respectively.)	1989	1	2	—	1	—	3	—	—	4	5	RIAA: Platinum; ARIA: Platinum; BPI: Platinum; RMNZ: Gold	Beaches: Original Soundtrack Recording
"I Know You by Heart" (Note: "I Know You by Heart" was released as a single only in Australia.)	1989	—	—	—	118	—	—	—	—	—	—		Beaches: Original Soundtrack Recording
"From a Distance" (Note: "From a Distance" also reached number 3 in Ireland. On the Canadian End-of-Year charts for 1990, the track was classified as the 15th most successful amongst Adult Contemporary songs and the 61st most selling in general, respectively.)	1990	2	1	—	8	1	7	14	3	3	6	RIAA: Platinum; ARIA: Gold	Some People's Lives
"Night and Day"	1991	62	15	—	84	6	68	—	—	50	—		Some People's Lives
"The Gift of Love"	1991	—	19	—	—	3	40	—	—	—	—		Some People's Lives
"Moonlight Dancing"	1991	—	—	—	—	—	—	—	—	—	—		Some People's Lives
"Every Road Leads Back to You" (Note: "Every Road Leads Back to You" was classified as the 73rd from the Top 100 Adult Contemporary tracks of 1992 in Canada.)	1991	78	15	—	74	10	66	—	—	—	—		For the Boys: Music from the Motion Picture
"In My Life"	1992	—	20	—	107	32	—	—	—	—	—		For the Boys: Music from the Motion Picture
"To Deserve You" (Note: "To Deserve You" charted also at number 14 in Japan, while on the US Dance End-of-Year chart it was classified at No. 45.)	1995	—	—	2	—	18	—	—	7	—	173		Bette of Roses
"In This Life"	1995	—	—	—	—	26	—	—	—	—	146		Bette of Roses
"God Help the Outcasts"	1996	—	—	—	—	—	—	—	—	—	—		The Hunchback Of Notre Dame: An Original Walt Disney Records Soundtrack
"You Don't Own Me" (with Goldie Hawn and Diane Keaton)	1996	—	—	—	—	—	—	—	—	—	—		The First Wives Club: Music from the Motion Picture...And Then Some
"My One True Friend"	1998	—	16	—	—	49	—	—	87	—	58		Bathhouse Betty
"I'm Beautiful"	1999	—	—	1	—	—	—	—	—	—	—		Bathhouse Betty
"In These Shoes"	2001	—	—	8	—	—	—	—	—	—	—		Bette
"White Christmas"	2003	—	15	—	—	—	—	—	—	—	—		Bette Midler Sings the Rosemary Clooney Songbook
"Fever"	2005	—	—	4	—	—	—	—	—	—	—		Bette Midler Sings the Peggy Lee Songbook
"From a Distance" (Christmas version)	2006	—	13	—	—	—	—	—	—	—	—		Cool Yule
"Wind Beneath My Wings" (re-issue)	2008	—	—	—	—	—	—	—	—	—	70		The Best Bette
"Be My Baby"	2014	—	—	—	—	—	—	—	—	—	—		It's the Girls!
"—" denotes a single that did not chart or was not released in that region.

=== As featured artist ===
List of singles as featured artist, with selected chart positions and certifications
Title	Year	Peak chart positions										Certifications	Album
Title	Year	AU	CAN	CAN AC	GER	NLD 40	NLD 100	NZ	UK	US	US AC	Certifications	Album
"We Are the World" (as part of USA for Africa)	1985	1	1	1	2	1	1	1	1	1	1	RIAA: 4× Platinum; BPI: Silver; MC: 3× Platinum	We Are the World

=== Promotional singles ===
List of promotional singles, with selected chart positions and notes
Title	Year	Peak chart positions	Notes
Title	Year	US DC	Notes
"Old Cape Cod"^{[L]}	1976	—	Two-track SP featuring a stereo and mono version of the song from Songs for the New Depression album, released in the US.
"Paradise"^{[L]}	1977	—	Two-track SP featuring a stereo and mono version of the song from Broken Blossom album, released in the US.
"Big Noise from Winnetka"^{[Q]}	1979	98	Originally a song from Thighs and Whispers, released in the US and Canada. In Canada, the single included the album version of "Rain" on the B-side.
"Small World" (featuring Peter Riegert)	1993	—	One-track US promotional CD single, taken from the original soundtrack recording of Gypsy.
"That's How Love Moves"^{[W]}	1996	—	One-track single issued in Germany, almost two years prior to its official release on the album Bathhouse Betty.
"La vie en rose"	1999	—	Japanese 3" CD release including "The Rose", featured in the Japanese Nissan TV advertisement.
"Nobody Else But You"^{[X]}	2000	—	One-track US release issued in support of the TV Bette series, featuring the original version of the song from her 2000 album of the same name.
"Bless You Child"	2000	—	Two-track promo CD single released in Japan, featuring also "Nobody Else But You", both from her album Bette.
"Love T.K.O."	2001	—	One-track promotional picture CD issued in the US, also from the Bette set.

== Other appearances ==
Year	Song	Role	Notes
1980	"Blueberry Pie"	Lead vocal	A song by Bruce Roberts and Carole Bayer Sager; appears on VA compilation In Harmony: A Sesame Street Record (Note: In Harmony: A Sesame Street Record charted at number 156 on the Billboard 200 in the US, and the compilation received a Grammy Award for Best Album for Children in 1981.) on Warner Bros.
1988	"Perfect Isn't Easy"	Lead vocal	A song written by Bruce Sussman and Jack Feldman for the Walt Disney soundtrack of Oliver & Company (1988) by George Scribner.
1992	"Somewhere in My Memory"	Lead vocal	A song written by John Williams and Leslie Bricusse that appears on the soundtrack Home Alone 2: Lost in New York, issued on Fox.
1995	"It's Gonna Take a Miracle" with The Manhattan Transfer	Lead vocal	A song written by Teddy Randazzo, Lou Stallman and Bobby Weinstein, released on the vocal group's album Tonin' (1995) on Atlantic.
1995	"Up, Up, Up"	Lead vocal	Appears as B-side on the US and German release of her 1995's single "To Deserve You".
1997	"Somewhere Along the Way" featuring Tommy Flanagan	Lead vocal	A song written by Kurt Adams and Sammy Gallop, appears on the soundtrack That Old Feeling (1997) on MCA.
1998	"Heaven"	Lead vocal	A song written by Julie Gold, issued as a bonus track on Japanese version of her set Bathhouse Betty and as B-side of the single "My One True Friend" in Germany, respectively.
2004	"Manhattan" with Rod Stewart	Lead vocal	A duet with Stewart, written by Richard Rodgers and Lorenz Hart, recorded for his album Stardust: The Great American Songbook, Volume III (2004) on J.
2005	"Baby Mine"	Lead vocal	A song recorded for the VA Disney compilation Wishes! (2005), issued in support of the Make-A-Wish Foundation.
2010	"The Greatest Ears in Town" featuring Barry Gibb	Lead vocal, co-writer	A song written by herself along with Marc Shaiman, released on the final Arif Mardin's set All My Friends Are Here (2010) on NuNoise.

=== Unreleased songs ===
Year	Song	Role	Notes
1982	"No Jinx"	Lead vocal	A song written by Bruce Roberts, Allee Willis and Brock Walsh for the film Jinxed! (1982) by Don Siegel.
1989	"One More Cheer"	Lead vocal	A song written by Jay Gruska and Paul Gordon for the movie Stella (1990) by John Erman.
1993	"I Put a Spell on You"	Lead vocal	A song written by Jay Hawkins for the film Hocus Pocus (1993) by Kenny Ortega.

== Videos ==
=== Video albums ===
Year	Album details	Notes	Certifications
1984	The Bette Midler Show: Label: Embassy (#0630 19425); Format: VHS, Betamax, Laserdisc	Originally HBO video special by Aaron Russo Productions, recorded live in February 1976 in Cleveland during The Depression Tour.	
1986	Art or Bust: Label: Vestron (#VA 13080); Format: VHS, Laserdisc, DVD (2010)	Originally aired as the HBO program Art or Bust (1984) with live recordings from Midler's "De Tour" in Minneapolis in 1983, with additional archive footage from the Continental Baths in NYC in 1971 and the UJA's Telethon of 1973. Released on DVD in 2010 as The Divine Miss M in Performance.	
1997	Diva Las Vegas (Note: Diva Las Vegas topped the Australian Music DVD chart in October 1997, and was classified as the 19th most selling DVD in 2005 in Australia.): Label: Warner/HBO (#0630 19425); Format: VHS, DVD (2000)	Import release, in 2000 re-issued on DVD. Also available as a bonus disc on the UK Deluxe Edition of The Best Bette from 2009.	ARIA: 2× Platinum; BPI: Gold
2011	The Showgirl Must Go On: Label: Image (#7338VYDVDLIT); Format: DVD	US release, featuring her concert show from The Colosseum at Caesars Palace in Las Vegas that run from 2008 to 2010.	

=== Music videos ===
Year	Song	Director
1983	"Favorite Waste of Time"	Tommy Shalami
1983	"Beast of Burden"	Allan Arkush
1988	"Under the Boardwalk"	
1988	"Wind Beneath My Wings"	
1990	"From a Distance"	Tamra Davis
1990	"Night and Day"	Meiert Avis
1991	"Every Road Leads Back to You"	
1995	"To Deserve You"	Marcus Nispel
1995	"To Deserve You" (Remix)	
1998	"My One True Friend"	
2006	"Cool Yule"	

== See also ==
- List of number-one hits (United States)
- List of number-one dance hits (United States)
- List of artists who reached number one on the Hot 100 (U.S.)
- List of artists who reached number one on the U.S. Dance chart
- List of artists who reached number one on the Australian singles chart
- List of Top 25 albums for 1989 in Australia
