= Jackpot! The Best Bette =

Compilation album by Bette Midler released in 2008

Greatest hits album by Bette Midler
- Released: September 23, 2008
- Label: Rhino Entertainment

Bette Midler chronology
| Cool Yule (2006) | Jackpot! The Best Bette (2008) | Memories of You (2010) |

Singles from Jackpot! The Best Bette
- 1. "Wind Beneath My Wings"

Professional ratings
Review scores
| Source | Rating |
|---|---|
| Allmusic | 4.5/5 stars |

Jackpot! The Best Bette, released as The Best Bette in Europe, is a compilation album of recordings by American singer Bette Midler released on September 23, 2008. The album release was originally set to coincide with Midler's Las Vegas show, Bette Midler: The Showgirl Must Go On which debuted on February 20, 2008, at the Colosseum at Caesars Palace, but was postponed to April, then August 26, and later to the actual September release.

After some thirty-five years in showbusiness and having recorded some twenty albums for Atlantic Records/Warner Music and three for Columbia Records/Sony BMG, this is the second single-disc compilation of Midler's best-known recordings, following 1993/1996's Experience the Divine, and this time released by Warner Music Group's reissue subsidiary Rhino Entertainment. Jackpot! The Best Bette includes three titles from Midler's more recent albums for Columbia, "This Ole House", "Tenderly" and "Cool Yule", and also sees the debut of one previously unreleased track, "Something Your Heart's Been Telling Me", co-written by Midler, Robert Kraft and Barry Reynolds and originally cut as a demo by the singer herself in 1984 but first released by Roberta Flack who recorded the song for her 1991 album Set the Night to Music.

"My One True Friend" and "The Gift of Love" were added to a later version of the CD. A 2009 reissue included three additional tracks – "Miss Otis Regrets", "To Deserve You (Arif's Dance Radio Mix)" and "In My Life", as well as the DVD of her 1997 HBO special Diva Las Vegas.

As of November 2014, the album has sold 667,666 copies in the UK.

== Track listing ==
1. "In the Mood" (Joe Garland, Andy Razaf) – 2:39
  - From 1973 album Bette Midler
2. "This Ole House" (Stuart Hamblen) – 3:02
  - From 2003 album Bette Midler Sings the Rosemary Clooney Songbook
3. "Beast of Burden" (Mick Jagger, Keith Richards) – 3:48
  - From 1983 album No Frills
4. "Just My Imagination (Running Away with Me)" (Norman Whitfield, Barrett Strong) – 3:54
  - From 2000 album Bette
5. "The Rose" (Amanda McBroom) – 3:40
  - From 1980 album The Rose
6. "When a Man Loves a Woman" (Calvin Lewis, Andrew Wright) – 4:42
  - From 1980 album The Rose
7. "I've Still Got My Health" (Cole Porter) – 1:32
  - From 1988 album Beaches
8. "Spring Can Really Hang You Up the Most" (Fran Landesman, Tommy Wolf) – 5:30
  - From 1990 album Some People's Lives
9. "Hello in There" (John Prine) – 4:17
  - From 1972 album The Divine Miss M
10. "The Glory of Love" (Billy Hill) – 3:16
  - From 1988 album Beaches
11. "Tenderly" (Walter Lloyd Gross, Jack Lawrence) – 3:11
  - From 2003 album Bette Midler Sings the Rosemary Clooney Songbook
12. "Wind Beneath My Wings" (Larry Henley, Jeff Silbar) – 4:52
  - From 1988 album Beaches
13. "Do You Want to Dance?" (Bobby Freeman) – 2:44
  - From 1972 album The Divine Miss M
14. "Baby Mine" (Ned Washington, Frank Churchill) – 2:27
  - From 1988 album Beaches
15. "From a Distance" (Julie Gold) – 4:37
  - From 1990 album Some People's Lives
16. "Boogie Woogie Bugle Boy" (Single Version) (Don Raye, Hughie Prince) – 2:25
  - From 1972 album The Divine Miss M
17. "Friends" (Mark Klingman, Buzzy Linhart) – 2:50
  - From 1972 album The Divine Miss M
18. "Something Your Heart Has Been Telling Me" (Robert Kraft, Bette Midler, Barry Reynolds) – 5:10
  - 1984 demo, previously unreleased
19. "Cool Yule" (Steve Allen, Eric Kornfeld) – 2:28
  - From 2006 album Cool Yule
20. "My One True Friend* (From the Motion Picture "One True Thing") – 3:50
  - From 1998 album Bathhouse Betty Amazon MP3 Store bonus track
21. "The Gift of Love*" – 4:01
  - From 1990 album Some People's Lives iTunes UK bonus track
- Does not appear on earlier versions of this CD.

== Charts ==
=== Weekly charts ===
| Chart (2008) | Peak position |
|---|---|
| Irish Albums (IRMA) | 4 |
| Norwegian Albums (VG-lista) | 36 |
| Scottish Albums (OCC) | 4 |
| Swedish Albums (Sverigetopplistan) | 10 |
| UK Albums (OCC) | 6 |
| US Billboard 200 | 66 |

=== Year-end charts ===
| Chart (2008) | Position |
|---|---|
| UK Albums (OCC) | 37 |
| Chart (2009) | Position |
| UK Albums (OCC) | 42 |

== Certifications ==
| Region | Certification | Certified units/sales |
|---|---|---|
| United Kingdom (BPI) | 2× Platinum | 600,000^{*} |
^{*} Sales figures based on certification alone.
