= List of songs recorded by Bette Midler =

List of Bette Midler songs
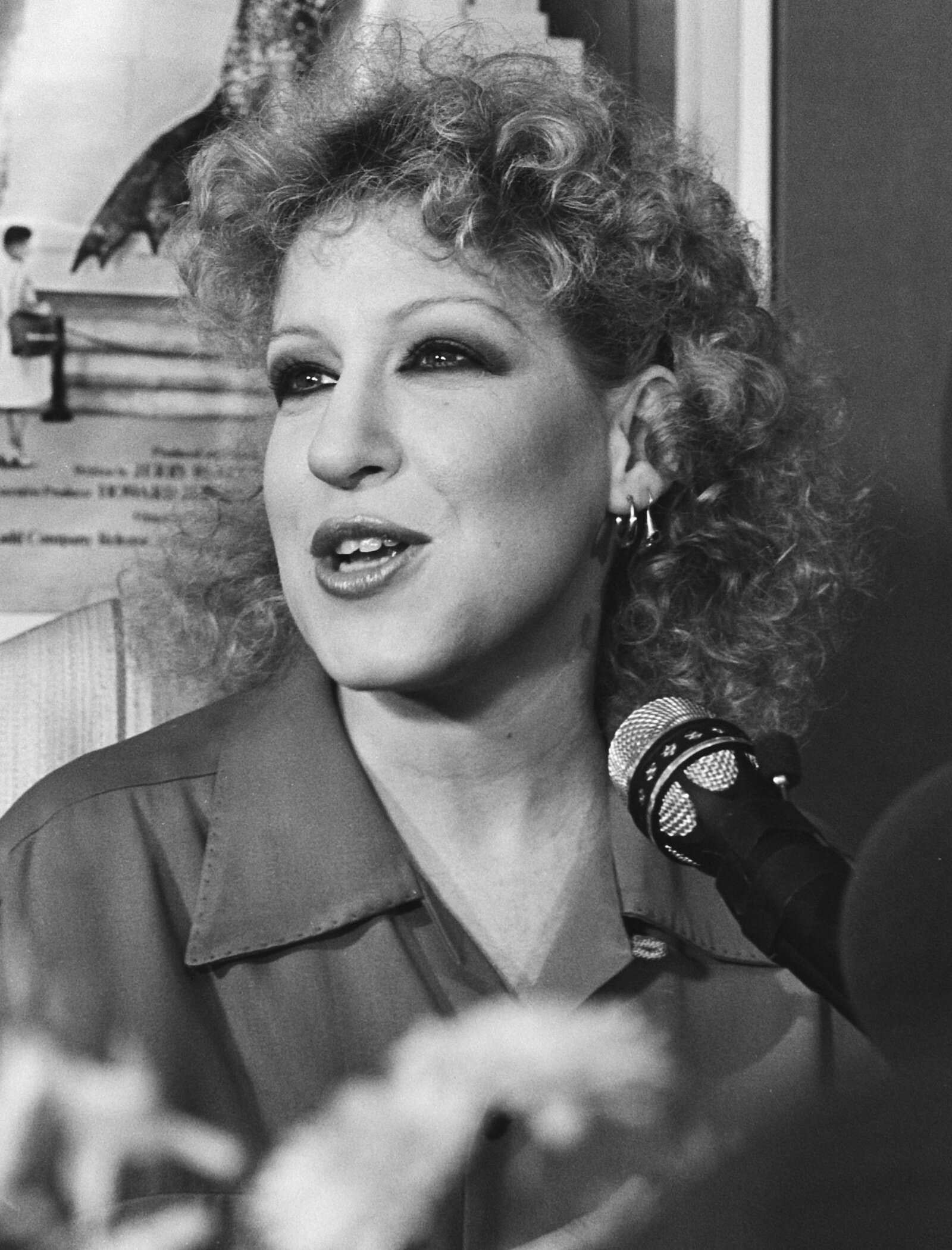
- Midler in 1981
- Total: 233

Below is an alphabetical list of songs recorded by American singer Bette Midler.

It contains only songs that have been officially released since 1972, regardless of whether they were recorded in the studio or they were only live releases. The list also includes songs released in the original format, excluding reissues. Also, the list did not include the singer's concert monologues from live albums.

As of 2024, the singer has recorded over 230 songs.

== A ==
- All I Need to Know (1983)
- All of a Sudden (1990)
- Alright, Okay, You Win (2005)
- Am I Blue (1972)
- As Dreams Go By (1995)

== B ==
- Baby It's Cold Outside (1991)
- Baby It's You (2014)
- Baby Mine (1988)
- Bang, You're Dead (1977)
- Beast of Burden (1983)
- Be My Baby (2014)
- Bed of Roses (1995)
- Before the Parade Passes By (2017)
- Bei Mir Bist Du Schön (2014)
- Big Noise from Winnetka (1979)
- Big Socks (1998)
- Big Spender (2005)
- Billy-A-Dick (1991)
- Birds (1977)
- Bless You Child (2000)
- Blueberry Pie (1980)
- Boogie Woogie Bugle Boy (1972)
- Bottomless (1995)
- Boxing (1998)
- Breaking Up Somebody's Home (1973)
- Buckets of Rain (1976)

== C ==
- Camelia (1979)
- Chapel of Love (1972)
- Color of Roses (2000)
- Come and Get These Memories (2014)
- Come Back Jimmy Dean (1983)
- Come On-a My House (2003)
- Come Rain or Come Shine (1991)
- Cool Yule (2006)
- Cradle Days (1979)

== D ==
- Dancing (2017)
- Daytime Hustler (1972)
- Delta Dawn (1972)
- Do You Want to Dance? (1972)
- A Dream Is a Wish Your Heart Makes (1977)
- Dreamland (1991)
- Drinking Again (1973)

== E ==
- E Street Shuffle / Summer (The First Time) / Leader of the Pack (1980)
- Empty Bed Blues (1977)
- Every Road Leads Back to You (1991)
- Everything's Coming Up Roses (1993)

== F ==
- Fat as I Am (1985)
- Favorite Waste of Time (1983)
- Fever (2005)
- Finale (2017)
- Finale: Up the Ladder to the Roof / Boogie Woogie Bugle Boy / Friends (1977)
- Fire Down Below (1980)
- The Folks Who Live on the Hill (2005)
- For All We Know (1991)
- Friends (1972)
  - Friends / Oh My My (1977)
- From a Distance (1990)

== G ==
- The Gift of Love (1990)
- The Girl Friend of the Whirling Dervish (1991)
- The Girl Is On to You (1990)
- Give Him a Great Big Kiss (2014)
- The Glory of Love (1988)
- God Give Me Strength (2000)
- God Help the Outcasts (1996)
- The Greatest Ears in Town (2010)

== H ==
- Hang On in There Baby (1979)
- Happiness Is a Thing Called Joe (2005)
- Have Yourself a Merry Little Christmas (2006)
- Heaven (1998)
- He Needs Me (2005)
- He's a Tramp (2005)
- He's Sure the Boy I Love (2014)
- Hello, Dolly! (2017)
- Hello in There (1972)
- Heart Over Head (1983)
- Hey There (2003)
- Higher & Higher (Your Love Keeps Lifting Me) (1973)
- The Hunter Gets Captured by the Game (2006)
- Hurricane (1979)
- Hurry On Down (1977)

== I ==
- I Believe in You (1995)
- I Don't Want the Night to End (1976)
- I Heard the Bells on Christmas Day (2006)
- I Love Being Here with You (2005)
- I Know This Town (1995)
- I Know You by Heart (1988)
- I Never Talk to Strangers (1977)
- I Put My Hand In (2017)
- I Remember You (1991)
  - I Remember You / Dixie's Dream (1991)
- I Shall Be Released (1973)
- I Sold My Heart to the Junkman (1998)
- I Think It's Going to Rain Today (1988)
- I'll Be Home for Christmas (2006)
- I'm a Woman (2005)
- I'm Beautiful (1998)
- I'm Hip (1998)
- I'm Singing Broadway (1985)
- It's Gonna Take a Miracle (1994)
- It's the Girl (2014)
- It's Too Late (1995)
- I've Got My Love to Keep Me Warm (2006)
- I've Still Got My Health (1988)
- In the Cool, Cool, Cool of the Evening (2003)
- In My Life (1991)
- In the Mood (1973)
- Is That All There Is? (2005)
- In These Shoes (2000)
- In This Life (1995)
- Is It Love (1983)

== J ==
- Just My Imagination (Running Away with Me) (2000)

== K ==
- Keep on Rockin' (1979)

== L ==
- The Last Time (1995)
- Laughing Matters (1998)
- Leader of the Pack (1972)
- Let Me Call You Sweetheart (1979)
- Let Me Drive (1983)
- Let Me Just Follow Behind (1976)
- Long John Blues (1977)
- Love Me With a Feeling (1979)
- Love Says It's Waiting (1976)
- Love T.K.O. (2000)
- Lullaby in Blue (1998)

== M ==
- Make Yourself Comfortable (1977)
- Mambo Italiano (2003)
- Marahuana (1976)
- Married Men (1979)
- Mele Kalikimaka (2006)
- Memories of You (2003)
- Merry Christmas (2006)
- Midnight in Memphis (1979)
- Millworker (1979)
- Miss Otis Regrets (1990)
- Moonlight Dancing (1990)
- Moses (2000)
- Motherhood (2017)
- Mr. Goldstone (1993)
- Mr. Rockefeller (1976)
- Mr. Sandman (2014)
- Mr. Wonderful (2005)
- My Eye on You (1983)
- My Knight in Black Leather (1979)
- My Mother's Eyes (1980)
- My One True Friend (1998)

== N ==
- Night and Day (1990)
- No Jestering (1976)
- Nobody Else But You (2000)

== O ==
- O Come, O Come, Emmanuel (2006)
- Oh Industry (1988)
- On a Slow Boat to China (2003)
- One More Round (1990)
- One Fine Day (2014)
- One For My Baby (And One More For the Road) (1993)
- One Monkey Don't Stop No Show (1998)
- One Way or Another (2022)
- Only in Miami (1983)
- Optimistic Voices / Lullaby of Broadway (1973)
- Otto Titsling (1985)
- Old Cape Cod (1976)

== P ==
- P.S. I Love You (1991)
- Paradise (1977)
- Perfect Isn't Easy (1988)
- The Perfect Kiss (1995)
- Put On Your Sunday Clothes (2017)

== R ==
- Rain (1979)
- Red (1977)
- The Rose (1979)
- Rose's Turn (1993)

== S ==
- Say Goodbye to Hollywood (1977)
- Shining Star (2000)
- Shiver Me Timbers (1977)
  - Shiver Me Timbers / Samedi et Vendredi (1976)
- Since You Stayed Here (1990)
- Sisters (2003)
- Small World (1993)
- Skylark (1973)
- So Long Dearie (2017)
- Soda and a Souvenir (1983)
- Sold My Soul to Rock 'N' Roll (1979)
- Song of Bernadette (1998)
- Some People (1993)
- Some People's Lives (1990)
- Something Your Heart Has Been Telling Me (2008)
- Somewhere Along the Way (1997)
- Somewhere in My Memory (1992)
- Spring Can Really Hang You Up the Most (1990)
- Stay with Me (1979)
- The Story of Nanette: Nanette / Alabama Song / Drinking Again / Mr. Rockefeller / Ready to Begin Again / Do You Wanna Dance? (1977)
- Storybook Children (1977)
- Strangers in the Night (1976)
- Strike It While It's Hot (2000)
- Stuff Like That There (1991)
- Superstar (1972)
- Surabaya Johnny (1973)

== T ==
- (Talk to Me of) Mendocino (2006)
- Teach Me Tonight (2014)
- Tenderly (2003)
- That's How Heartaches Are Made (2000)
- That's How Love Moves (1998)
- Tell Him (2014)
- This Ole House (2003)
- To Comfort You (1995)
- To Deserve You (1995)
- Together (Wherever We Go) (1993)
- Too Many Fish in the Sea (2014)
- Tragedy (1976)
- Twisted (1973)

== U ==
- Ukulele Lady (1998)
- Under the Boardwalk (1988)
- Uptown / Don't Say Nothin' Bad (About My Baby) / Da Doo Run Run (1973)

== V ==
- Vickie and Mr. Valves (1991)
- The Vicki Eydie Show: Around the World / Istanbul / Fiesta in Rio / South Seas Scene / Hawaiian War Chant / Lullaby of Broadway (1977)
- La Vie en Rose (1977)

== W ==
- Waterfalls (2014)
- We Are the World (1985)
- What Are You Doing New Year's Eve? (2006)
- When a Man Loves a Woman (1979)
- When Your Life Was Low (2000)
- Whose Side Are You On (1979)
- White Christmas (2003)
- The Witches Are Back (2022)
- Will You Still Love Me Tomorrow (2014)
- Wind Beneath My Wings (1988)
- Winter Wonderland / Let It Snow! Let It Snow! Let It Snow! (2006)

== Y ==
- Yellow Beach Umbrella (1977)
- Yes Salem, We're Back! (2022)
- You Can't Always Get What You Want / I Shall Be Released (1980)
- You Can't Hurry Love (2014)
- You Don't Know Me (1977)
- You Don't Own Me (1996)
- You'll Never Get Away from Me (1993)
- You'll Never Know (2003)
- You're Movin' Out Today (1977)

== See also ==
- Bette Midler discography
