= The Best of Bette (1981 album) =

The Best of Bette (1981)

Greatest hits album by Bette Midler
- Released: 1981
- Recorded: 1972–1980
- Genre: Vocal
- Length: 57:20
- Label: K-tel NA 566

Bette Midler chronology
| Divine Madness (1980) | The Best of Bette (1981) (1981) | No Frills (1983) |

The Best of Bette is a compilation album by American singer Bette Midler, released on the K-tel label in Australia and New Zealand in 1981. The album was the second compilation to use the title The Best of Bette, the previous version with different cover art and an entirely different track list having been released on the Atlantic Records label in both the UK, Continental Europe, Scandinavia, Australia and New Zealand in 1978.

== Background ==
The K-tel compilation is highly notable in Midler's discography for a number of reasons, the first of them being that it was released by the US based K-tel label instead of Midler's original label Atlantic Records (today a subsidiary of Warner Music Group). K-Tel was a budget-price label specialising in releasing as-seen-on-TV compilations including the latest chart hits but at this stage rarely released a whole albums' worth of recordings by the one and same artist. Atlantic Records had exclusive rights to Midler's catalogue worldwide, the sixteen tracks were consequently licensed from Atlantic - but obviously only for release in Australia and New Zealand, not in the US or Europe. The second reason making the album both notable and collectable is the track selection; the album includes songs that by 1981 already had become standards in Midler's repertoire such as her signature tune "Friends", "Boogie Woogie Bugle Boy", "Delta Dawn" and "Do You Want To Dance" and combines these with ten tracks taken from her then three most recent albums; a) the disco-flavoured Thighs and Whispers (1979) and the two hit singles "Married Men" and "My Knight In Black Leather", b) the soundtrack The Rose (1980) and live recordings like "When A Man Loves A Woman", "Midnight In Memphis" and "Love With A Feeling" (the latter two never issued as singles) as well as the studio-recorded title track "The Rose" (the single version with orchestral overdubs, in effect making its debut on this album) and finally c) the soundtrack to the concert documentary Divine Madness (1980) and the tracks "My Mother's Eyes" (the only single release from the album) and "Fire Down Below" (also featured in the movie The Rose, but first released on the Divine Madness album). The K-Tel compilation couples these with a few selections from the albums Broken Blossom and Live at Last such as "Say Goodbye To Hollywood" and "You're Moving Out Today", the latter, a rare single mix with an additional verse making its second appearance on a compilation album.

The pictures used for the cover of the K-Tel version of The Best of Bette show Midler in concert, taken from the movie The Rose. The compilation is sometimes listed as having been released in 1980, other times in 1981. Considering the fact that the Divine Madness album was released worldwide in November 1980 it was more likely issued in 1981.

The first Bette Midler greatest hits compilation to be released worldwide, including the US and Canada, was 1993's Experience the Divine.

== Track listings ==
Side A

1. "The Rose" (Single version) (Amanda McBroom) - 3:40
  - Original version appears on 1980 album The Rose
2. "Boogie Woogie Bugle Boy" (Don Raye, Hughie Prince) - 2:26
  - From 1972 album The Divine Miss M
3. "When a Man Loves a Woman" (Live) (Calvin Lewis, Andrew Wright) - 4:42
  - From 1980 album The Rose
4. "My Mother's Eyes" (Live) (Tom Jans) - 2:26
  - From 1980 album Divine Madness
5. "Delta Dawn" (Alex Harvey, Larry Collins) - 5:16
  - From 1972 album The Divine Miss M
6. "In the Mood" (Joe Garland, Andy Razaf) - 2:37
  - From 1973 album Bette Midler
7. "Friends" (Mark Klingman, Buzzy Linhart) - 2:49
  - From 1972 album The Divine Miss M
8. "Do You Wanna Dance?" (Bobby Freeman) - 2:56
  - From 1972 album The Divine Miss M

Side B

1. "Fire Down Below" (Live) (Bob Seger) - 3:05
  - From 1980 album Divine Madness
2. "Say Goodbye to Hollywood" (Billy Joel)
  - From 1977 album Broken Blossom - 3:02
3. "Married Men" (Dominic Bugatti, Frank Musker) - 4:01
  - From 1979 album Thighs and Whispers
4. "My Knight In Black Leather" (Jerry Ragovoy, Estelle Levitt) - 4:53
  - From 1979 album Thighs and Whispers
5. "Midnight In Memphis" (Live) (Tony Johnson) - 3:23
  - From 1980 album The Rose
6. "Love Me With A Feeling" (Live) (Hudson Whittaker) - 3:38
  - From 1980 album The Rose
7. "You're Moving Out Today" (Single version) (Bette Midler, Carole Bayer Sager, Bruce Roberts) - 3:18
  - Original version appears on 1977 album Live at Last
8. "(Your Love Keeps Lifting Me) Higher and Higher" (Gary Lee Jackson) - 4:08
  - From 1973 album Bette Midler

=== Charts ===
Weekly chart performance for The Best of Bette
| Chart (1981) | Peak position |
|---|---|
| Australian Albums (Kent Music Report) | 40 |
