= My Mother's Eyes =

My Mother's Eyes may refer to:

- My Mother's Eyes (Etta Jones album), 1978
- My Mother's Eyes (Jaki Byard album), 1998
- My Mother's Eyes (Sonny Stitt album), 1963
- "My Mother's Eyes", a song written by Abel Baer and L. Wolfe Gilbert for the 1929 film Lucky Boy, recorded by many performers
- "My Mother's Eyes", a song by Bette Midler from Divine Madness, 1980
