= Divine madness (disambiguation) =

Divine madness is unconventional, outrageous, unexpected, or unpredictable behavior linked to religious or spiritual pursuits.

Divine Madness may also refer to:

- Divine Madness (Madness album), a 1992 album by Madness
- Divine Madness (film), a 1980 American concert film
  - Divine Madness (Bette Midler album), a 1980 soundtrack album by Bette Midler
- Divine Madness (novel), a 2006 novel by Robert Muchamore
- The Divine Madness, an American band
- Odin, a Germanic god
