= The Best of Bette =

The Best of Bette may refer to:

- The Best of Bette (1978 album) Bette Midler compilation album
- The Best of Bette (1981 album) Bette Midler compilation album
- The Best Bette (2008 album) Bette Midler compilation album

== See also ==
- Bette (disambiguation)
- The Best Bet (突然发财) 2004 film
- Best Bet (迎妻接福) 2007 TV series
