= Divine Madness (film) =

1980 American film directed by Michael Ritchie

- Theatrical release poster
- Directed by: Michael Ritchie
- Written by: Jerry Blatt; Bette Midler; Bruce Vilanch
- Produced by: Michael Ritchie
- Starring: Bette Midler
- Cinematography: William A. Fraker
- Music by: Tom Jans
- Production company: The Ladd Company
- Distributed by: Warner Bros.
- Release date: September 26, 1980
- Running time: 94 minutes
- Country: United States
- Language: English
- Box office: $5,318,098

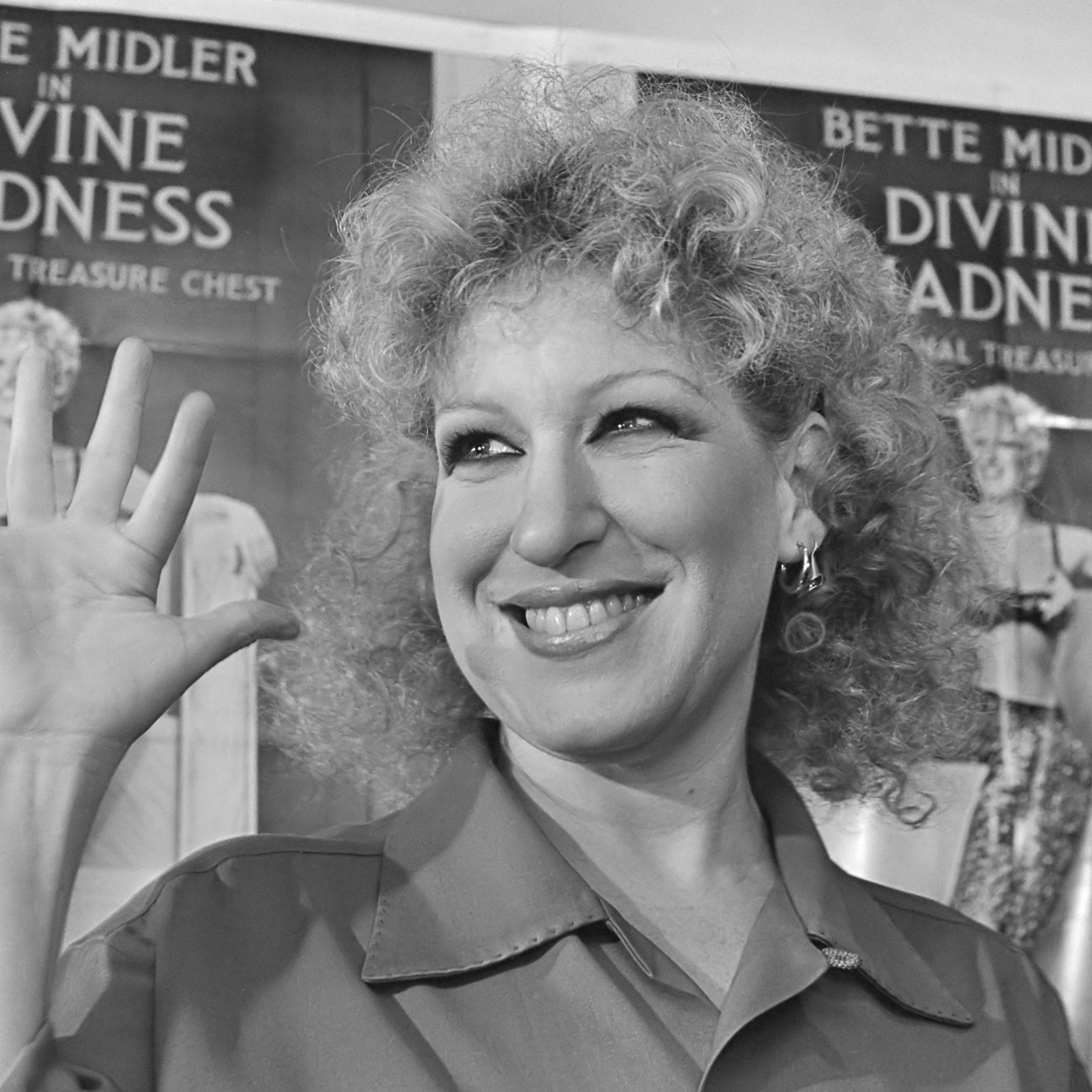
1981, Bette Midler in Amsterdam promoting the film

Divine Madness is a 1980 American concert film directed by Michael Ritchie, and featuring Bette Midler and the Harlettes during her February 13–15, 1980 concerts at Pasadena Civic Auditorium in Pasadena, California. The 94-minute film features Midler's stand-up comedy routines, as well as 16 songs, including "Big Noise from Winnetka", "Paradise", "Shiver Me Timbers", "Fire Down Below", "Stay With Me", "My Mother's Eyes", "Chapel of Love" / "Boogie Woogie Bugle Boy", "Do You Want to Dance", "You Can't Always Get What You Want" / "I Shall Be Released", "E Street Shuffle" / "Summer (The First Time)" / "Leader of the Pack", and "The Rose".

Richie filmed three of Midler's concerts on the Divine Madness Tour, and cut them together to look like one. Divine Madness was released in 1980 to relative critical success. The tracks "Shiver Me Timbers" and "Rainbow Sleeve" were edited out of the home video version. Divine Madness has been re-released on DVD, but, as yet, only in the US.

== Music ==
For further info see Divine Madness (Bette Midler album)
