= No Frills (Bette Midler album) =

Studio album by Bette Midler
- Released: August 1, 1983
- Recorded: 1983
- Studios: Clover (Hollywood); The Sound Factory (Hollywood); Rumbo (Los Angeles
- Genres: Pop, rock
- Length: 38:08
- Label: Atlantic
- Producer: Chuck Plotkin

Bette Midler chronology
The Best of Bette (1981)	No Frills (1983)	Mud Will Be Flung Tonight (1985)

Singles from No Frills
- 1. "All I Need to Know" Released: 1983; 2. "Favorite Waste of Time" Released: 1983; 3. "Beast of Burden" Released: February 10, 1984

Professional ratings
Review scores
Source	Rating
AllMusic	4/5 stars
Robert Christgau	B−
Q	1/5 stars
The Rolling Stone Album Guide	2/5 stars

No Frills is the sixth studio album by American singer Bette Midler, released on Atlantic Records in 1983. No Frills was Midler's first studio album in four years, following the films The Rose, Divine Madness!, and Jinxed!. The rock and new wave-influenced album was produced by Chuck Plotkin, best known for his work with Bob Dylan and Bruce Springsteen, and included three single releases; the ballad "All I Need to Know", a cover of Marshall Crenshaw's "You're My Favorite Waste of Time", and Midler's take on the Rolling Stones song "Beast of Burden".

== Release ==
While No Frills became Midler's second lowest-charting album in the US, peaking at #60 on Billboard (her 1979 disco album Thighs and Whispers charted at #65), it became her best-selling studio album to date in both continental Europe and Scandinavia; in West Germany it reached #15, in the Netherlands #10, in Norway #2 and in Sweden No Frills hit No. 1, outselling the Rose soundtrack.

"Beast of Burden" was a top 10 single in many parts of Europe. The promo video for the song, made during the early MTV era, featured Mick Jagger in a cameo role playing Midler's boyfriend. The soundtrack to the video including the spoken dialogue (with Midler famously telling Jagger "Just stay long enough to hear me sing your song; I sing it better than anybody"; Jagger then replies: "Well almost anybody....") was released on the B-side of the 12" single in Europe. In September 1984, the video was nominated for three MTV Video Music Awards for Best Female Video, Best Choreography, and Best Stage Performance Video.

Midler originally intended to include a cover of Bruce Springsteen's "Pink Cadillac" on the album instead of "Beast of Burden", but was blocked from releasing it by Springsteen himself, who said it wasn't a "girl's song". She hastily recorded the Rolling Stones cover to fill its place. However, she performed "Pink Cadillac" on her 1983 tour to promote the album.

When Midler's greatest hits compilation Experience the Divine was released in 1993, only one song from No Frills was included, "Only in Miami", an album track never released as a single in either the US or Europe. A second edition of the compilation with a revised track list, released in 1996, added both "Beast of Burden" and "Favorite Waste of Time".

No Frills was released on CD for the first time in 1983. A remastered version of the album was released by Atlantic Records/Warner Music in 1995.

== Track listing ==
Side A

1. "Is It Love" (Nick Gilder, James McCulloch) - 4:43
2. "Favorite Waste of Time" (Marshall Crenshaw) - 2:43
3. "All I Need to Know" (Barry Mann, Cynthia Weil, Tom Snow) - 4:08
4. "Only in Miami" (Max Gronenthal) - 4:35
5. "Heart Over Head" (Andy Goldmark, Robin Batteau, Brock Walsh) - 2:52

Side B

1. "Let Me Drive" (Greg Prestopino, Matthew Wilder) - 4:02
2. "My Eye on You" (Moon Martin, Bill House) - 4:03
3. "Beast of Burden" (Mick Jagger, Keith Richards) - 3:48
4. "Soda and a Souvenir" (Jessica Harper) - 3:23
5. "Come Back Jimmy Dean" (Bette Midler, Jerry Blatt, Brock Walsh) - 3:51

== Personnel ==
- Bette Midler – lead vocals, backing vocals
- Robert Irving III – synthesizers (1, 2), acoustic piano (5)
- Bobby Lyle – synthesizers (1, 6, 9), acoustic piano (3, 4), keyboards (7), Fender Rhodes (9)
- Bobby Martin – synthesizers (1, 3, 9), organ (6, 9), keyboards (7)
- Mark Goldenberg – synth solo (1, 3), guitars (1, 3, 8), guitar solo (2, 3), synthesizers (3, 5, 10), electric guitar (5)
- Chas Sanford – synthesizers (5), electric guitar (5)
- Buzz Feiten – guitars (1, 3, 4, 6, 7, 9)
- Philip Kennard – acoustic guitar (2), backing vocals (2)
- Brock Walsh – acoustic guitar (2), backing vocals (5), acoustic piano (10)
- Waddy Wachtel – electric guitar (2)
- Danny Kortchmar – guitars (8)
- Robert "Pops" Popswell – bass (1, 3, 4, 9)
- Dave Demare – bass (2)
- Mark Leonard – bass (5)
- Vernon Porter – bass (6, 7)
- Tim Drummond – bass (8)
- Ricky Lawson – drums (1, 3, 4, 6, 7, 9)
- David Logeman – drums (2), percussion (2)
- Jim Keltner – drums (5, 8)
- Malando Gassama – percussion (4)
- Bobbye Hall – congas (5)
- Mark Hatch – horns (4)
- Marc "Caz" Macino – horns (4, 6), horn arrangements (4)
- Laura Allan – backing vocals (2, 3, 4)
- Lisa Garber – backing vocals (2, 3, 4)
- Janis Cercone – backing vocals (3)
- Joe Turano – backing vocals (6)
- Greg Prestopino – backing vocals (6)
- Matthew Wilder – backing vocals (6)
- Jude Johnstone – backing vocals (7)
- The Staggering Harlettes (Ula Hedwig, Katey Sagal and Linda Hart) – backing vocals (9)

== Production ==
- Chuck Plotkin – producer
- Brock Walsh – associate producer
- Danny Goldberg – executive producer
- Toby Scott – recording, mixing (9)
- Don Smith – additional recording, mixing (1–8, 10)
- Greg Anderson – assistant engineer
- Steve Brix – assistant engineer
- Dave Demore – assistant engineer
- Dave Pearce – assistant engineer
- Julian Stoll – assistant engineer
- Debbie Gold – production supervisor
- Bonnie Bruckheimer – production associate
- John Kosh – art direction, design
- Ron Larson – art direction, design
- Andre Miripolsky – cover art
- Greg Gorman – photography

Studios

- Recorded at Clover Recorders and The Sound Factory (Hollywood, California); Rumbo Recorders (Los Angeles, California).
- Mixed at Clover Studios and Rumbo Recorders.

== Charts ==
Chart performance for No Frills
Chart (1983)	Peak position
Australian Albums (Kent Music Report)	43
Canada Top Albums/CDs (RPM)	71
Dutch Albums (Album Top 100)	41
German Albums (Offizielle Top 100)	46
Norwegian Albums (VG-lista)	3
Swedish Albums (Sverigetopplistan)	1
US Billboard 200	60
US Top 100 Albums (Cash Box)	33
