= Divine Madness (Bette Midler album) =

Live album by Bette Midler
- Released: November 7, 1980
- Recorded: February 13–15, 1980
- Genre: Vocal
- Length: 43:35
- Label: Atlantic
- Producer: Dennis Kirk

Bette Midler chronology
The Rose (1979)	Divine Madness (1980)	The Best of Bette (1981)

Singles from Divine Madness
- 1. "My Mother's Eyes"; 2. "Chapel of Love"

Professional ratings
Review scores
Source	Rating
Allmusic	4/5 stars
Robert Christgau	C+
The Rolling Stone Album Guide	2/5 stars

Divine Madness is an album by American singer Bette Midler and the Harlettes, released in 1980. It is a live recording taken from Midler's Divine Madness concert film, released the same year. The album, however, does not contain any of Midler's comedy routines and features only her musical performances from the show and it in fact only provides half of the songs that appear in the film. The original live recordings were also to a large extent edited and re-recorded in the studio for the soundtrack album.

Among the tracks included are "Big Noise From Winnetka", from Midler's disco album Thighs and Whispers, repertoire standards like "Shiver Me Timbers", "Chapel of Love", "Leader of The Pack" and "Boogie Woogie Bugle Boy" along with two tracks from her movie The Rose, "Stay With Me" and "Fire Down Below" (not originally included on the soundtrack) released earlier in 1980 and the Divine Madness album closes with renditions of rock classics like Bruce Springsteen's "E Street Shuffle", The Rolling Stones' "You Can't Always Get What You Want" and Bob Dylan's "I Shall Be Released".

The final film excluded "My Mother's Eyes," despite it being released as a single, and "Shiver Me Timbers" was not featured in the home video release (VHS or DVD). Footage of these songs have not been restored.

The soundtrack does not include "Do You Want to Dance?," "Ready to Begin Again," "My Way," "To the South Seas/Hawaiian War Chant," "Ebb Tide," "The Rose," or any monologues.

The Divine Madness album like the movie itself was a moderate commercial success, peaking at #34 on Billboard's album chart.

The album was released on CD for the first time in 1989. A remastered version of the album was released by Atlantic Records/Warner Music in 1995.

== Track listing ==
Side A

1. "Big Noise From Winnetka" (Gil Rodin, Bob Crosby, Bob Haggart, Ray Bauduc) - 3:52
2. "Paradise" (Harry Nilsson, Gil Garfield, Perry Botkin Jr.) - 4:09
3. "Shiver Me Timbers" (Tom Waits) - 3:56
4. "Fire Down Below" (Bob Seger) - 3:05
5. "Stay With Me" (Jerry Ragovoy, George Weiss) - 6:24

Side B

1. "My Mother's Eyes" (Tom Jans) - 2:29
2. "Chapel of Love" / "Boogie Woogie Bugle Boy" (Jeff Barry, Ellie Greenwich, Phil Spector) / (Don Raye, Hughie Prince) - 4:02
3. "E Street Shuffle" / "Summer (The First Time)" / "Leader of the Pack" (Bruce Springsteen) / (Bobby Goldsboro) / (George Morton, Jeff Barry, Ellie Greenwich) - 9:42
4. "You Can't Always Get What You Want" / "I Shall Be Released" (Mick Jagger, Keith Richards) / (Bob Dylan) - 5:56

== Personnel ==
- Bette Midler - lead vocals
- Tony Berg - guitar, background vocals
- Jon Bonine - trombone, background vocals
- Joey Carbone - keyboards, background vocals
- Rich Cooper - trumpet
- David Luell - saxophone
- John Pierce - bass guitar
- David Shank - percussion
- Chas Sanford - lead guitar
- Art Wood - drums
- Michael Boddicker - synthesizers
- Randy Kerber - keyboards, background vocals
- Jocelyn Brown - background vocals
- Ula Hedwig - background vocals
- Diva Gray - background vocals
- Luther Vandross - background vocals

== Production ==
- Dennis Kirk - record producer, sound engineer
- Tony Berg - musical arranger & supervisor
- Randy Kerber - musical arranger & supervisor
- Mixed at Sunset Sound and Record One
- Remixed at Regent Sound Studios and Atlantic Studios
- Concert Recording: Wally Heider Studios
- Assistant Engineers: Niko Bolas, James Lerner, David Lerner
- Mastered by: Bernie Grundman

== Charts ==
Chart performance for Divine Madness
Chart (1980)	Peak position
Australian Albums (Kent Music Report)	20
New Zealand Albums (RMNZ)	12
US Billboard 200	34
US Top 100 Albums (Cash Box)	43
US The Album Chart (Record World)	57
