= Experience the Divine: Greatest Hits =

- US edition

Greatest hits album by Bette Midler
- Released: June 22, 1993
- Genre: Vocal
- Length: 51:35; 66:27 (re-release)
- Label: Atlantic

Bette Midler chronology
For the Boys (1991)	Experience the Divine: Greatest Hits (1993)	Gypsy (1993)

Alternative cover
- International edition

Professional ratings
Review scores
Source	Rating
AllMusic	4.5/5 stars
Robert Christgau	(choice cut)
Entertainment Weekly	B−
The Rolling Stone Album Guide	3.5/5 stars

Experience the Divine: Greatest Hits is a compilation album by American singer Bette Midler, featuring many of her best-known songs. The fourteen track compilation was released on Atlantic Records in 1993.

While several greatest hits albums with Midler had been released in the UK, Continental Europe, Scandinavia, Australia, New Zealand and Japan throughout the 1970s and 1980s, such as The Best of Bette (1978) and The Best of Bette (1981)—two different compilations with the same title—and Just Hits (1987), this was the first career overview to be released worldwide including the US and Canada, some twenty years after Midler recorded her first studio album for the Atlantic Records label. The album included one new recording, Midler's Emmy Award-winning rendition of "One for My Baby (and One More for the Road)", sung to retiring talk show host Johnny Carson on the penultimate Tonight Show in May 1992. Experience the Divine: Greatest Hits peaked at number 50 on the Billboard 200 albums chart in 1993 and was three years later certified platinum for one million copies sold in the US.

Experience the Divine: Greatest Hits was re-released in Europe, Australia and New Zealand in 1996 with a slightly altered track list, then also including two of Midler's biggest hits which for some reason had been left off the 1993 edition; "Favorite Waste of Time" and the Rolling Stones cover "Beast of Burden", both from the 1983 album No Frills. The 1996 edition also included two versions of the US hit single "To Deserve You", taken from what became Midler's final studio album for Atlantic, 1995's Bette of Roses.

== Track listings ==
=== 1993 edition ===
1. "Hello in There" (John Prine) – 4:17
  - From the 1972 album The Divine Miss M
2. "Do You Want to Dance?" (Bobby Freeman) – 2:44
  - From the 1972 album The Divine Miss M
3. "From a Distance" (Julie Gold) – 4:37
  - From the 1990 album Some People's Lives
4. "Chapel of Love" (Jeff Barry, Ellie Greenwich, Phil Spector) – 2:53
  - From the 1972 album The Divine Miss M
5. "Only in Miami" (Max Gronenthal) – 3:57
  - From the 1983 album No Frills
6. "When a Man Loves a Woman" (Calvin Lewis, Andrew Wright) – 4:42
  - From the 1979 soundtrack album The Rose
7. "The Rose" (Single version) (Amanda McBroom) – 3:40
  - From the 1979 soundtrack album The Rose
8. "Miss Otis Regrets" (Cole Porter) – 2:39
  - From the 1990 album Some People's Lives
9. "Shiver Me Timbers" (Live version) (Tom Waits) – 4:42
  - From the 1977 album Live at Last. Original studio version appears on 1976 album Songs for the New Depression
10. "Wind Beneath My Wings" (Larry Henley, Jeff Silbar) – 4:52
  - From the 1988 soundtrack album Beaches
11. "Boogie Woogie Bugle Boy" (Don Raye, Hughie Prince) – 2:19
  - Previously unavailable on album hit 45 version. Original studio version appears on 1972 album The Divine Miss M
12. "One for My Baby (and One More for the Road)" (Live) (Harold Arlen, Johnny Mercer, additional lyrics by Marc Shaiman and Bette Midler) – 4:06
  - Previously unreleased. Recorded and aired on The Tonight Show Starring Johnny Carson on May 21, 1992.
13. "Friends" (Mark Klingman, Buzzy Linhart) – 2:55
  - From the 1972 album The Divine Miss M
14. "In My Life" (Single version) (John Lennon, Paul McCartney) – 3:12
  - From the 1991 soundtrack album For the Boys

=== 1996 edition ===
1. "To Deserve You" (single remix) (Maria McKee) – 4:11
  - Original version appears on the 1995 album Bette of Roses
2. "Beast of Burden" (Mick Jagger, Keith Richards) – 3:48
  - From the 1983 album No Frills
3. "Favorite Waste of Time" (Marshall Crenshaw) – 2:40
  - From the 1983 album No Frills
4. "Hello in There" (Prine) – 4:17
  - From the 1972 album The Divine Miss M
5. "Do You Want to Dance?" (Freeman) – 2:44
  - From the 1972 album The Divine Miss M
6. "From a Distance" (Gold) – 4:38
  - From the 1990 album Some People's Lives
7. "Chapel of Love" (Barry, Greenwich, Spector) – 2:53
  - From the 1972 album The Divine Miss M
8. "Only in Miami" (Gronenthal) – 3:57
  - From the 1983 album No Frills
9. "When a Man Loves a Woman" (Lewis, Wright) – 4:54
  - From the 1979 soundtrack album The Rose
10. "The Rose" (McBroom) – 3:34
  - From 1979 soundtrack album The Rose
11. "Miss Otis Regrets" (Porter) – 2:39
  - From the 1990 album Some People's Lives
12. "Shiver Me Timbers" (Live version) (Tom Waits) – 4:42
  - From the 1977 album Live at Last. Original studio version appears on 1976 album Songs for the New Depression
13. "Wind Beneath My Wings" (Henley, Silbar) – 4:53
  - From the 1988 soundtrack album Beaches
14. "Boogie Woogie Bugle Boy" (Single version) (Prince, Raye) – 2:19
  - Original version appears on the 1972 album The Divine Miss M
15. "One for My Baby (and One More for the Road)" (Arlen, Mercer, additional lyrics by Marc Shaiman and Bette Midler) – 4:06
  - Previously unreleased. Recorded and aired on The Tonight Show Starring Johnny Carson on May 21, 1992.
16. "Friends" (Klingman, Linhart) – 2:55
  - From the 1972 album The Divine Miss M
17. "In My Life" (Single version) (Lennon, McCartney) – 3:12
  - From the 1991 soundtrack album For the Boys
18. "To Deserve You" (album version) (McKee) – 5:13
  - From the 1995 album Bette of Roses

== Production (1993 edition) ==
- Bette Midler – compilation producer
- Arif Mardin – compilation producer
- Scott Wittman – creative consultant
- Doug Sax – digital remastering at The Mastering Lab
- Greg Gorman – cover photo
- Rod Dyer Group / Qris Yamashita – art direction

== Charts ==
=== Weekly charts ===
Initial weekly chart performance for Experience the Divine: Greatest Hits
Chart (1993–1994)	Peak position
Australian Albums (ARIA)	3
Austrian Albums (Ö3 Austria)	35
Canada Top Albums/CDs (RPM)	27
European Albums (Music & Media)	31
German Albums (Offizielle Top 100)	67
Irish Albums (IFPI)	2
New Zealand Albums (RMNZ)	3
Scottish Albums (Official Charts)	88
UK Albums (Official Charts)	3
US Billboard 200	50
US Top 100 Pop Albums (Cash Box)	49

Latter weekly chart performance for Experience the Divine: Greatest Hits
Chart (1996–2005)	Peak position
Australian Albums (ARIA)	31
Dutch Albums (Album Top 100)	1
European Albums (Music & Media)	65
Scottish Albums (Official Charts)	95
UK Albums (Official Charts)	95

=== Year-end charts ===
1993 year-end chart performance for Experience the Divine: Greatest Hits
Chart (1993)	Position
Australian Albums (ARIA)	28
New Zealand Albums (RMNZ)	34
UK Albums (OCC)	20

1996 year-end chart performance for Experience the Divine: Greatest Hits
Chart (1993)	Position
Dutch Albums (Album Top 100)	11

== Certifications and sales ==
Certifications for Experience the Divine: Greatest Hits
Region	Certification	Certified units/sales
Australia (ARIA)	4× Platinum	280,000^{^}
Canada (Music Canada)	Gold	50,000^{^}
Netherlands (NVPI)	2× Platinum	200,000^{^}
New Zealand (RMNZ)	Gold	7,500^{^}
United Kingdom (BPI)	Platinum	300,000^{^}
United States (RIAA)	Platinum	1,000,000^{^}
^{^} Shipments figures based on certification alone.
