= Red Roses for Me (song) =

"Red Roses For Me"

Single by Niamh Kavanagh and The Dubliners
- Released: 1994
- Genre: Folk music, Irish music
- Label: Raglan Records

Niamh Kavanagh and The Dubliners singles chronology
"The Rose" (1991)	"Red Roses For Me" (1994)	"The Ballad of Ronnie Drew" (2008)

Red Roses For Me is a single by The Dubliners and Niamh Kavanagh charting at No.13 in the Irish Charts in 1994. This was the last single Ronnie Drew would ever release with The Dubliners.

== Charts ==
Chart (1994)	Peak position
Ireland (IRMA)	13
