= Only in Miami =

"Only in Miami" is a song written by Max Gronenthal and Scott Delawanna, recorded by Bette Midler. First released on Midler's 1983 album No Frills, it later appeared on her 1993 greatest hits compilation Experience the Divine. The song tells of a sad girl in Miami who longs to be back in her native Cuba. A jolly upbeat song, it was featured in the 1984 pilot episode of Miami Vice, "Brother's Keeper".
