= Married Men =

1979 single by Bonnie Tyler

Single by Bonnie Tyler
- B-side: "If You Ever Need Me Again"
- Released: May 11, 1979
- Genre: Disco
- Length: 3:45
- Label: RCA
- Songwriters: Dominic Bugatti; Frank Musker
- Producers: Ronnie Scott; Steve Wolfe

Bonnie Tyler singles chronology
"What a Way to Treat My Heart" (1979)	"Married Men" (1979)	"I Believe in Your Sweet Love" (1979)

"Married Men"

Single by Bette Midler

from the album Thighs and Whispers
- B-side: "Bang, You're Dead"
- Released: May 1979
- Studio: Atlantic Recording Studios (New York, NY)
- Genre: Disco
- Length: 3:35
- Label: Atlantic
- Songwriters: Dominic Bugatti; Frank Musker
- Producer: Arif Mardin

Bette Midler singles chronology
"Buckets of Rain" (1978)	"Married Men" (1979)	"Hang On in There Baby" (1979)

"Married Men" (also known as "(The World Is Full of) Married Men") is a song written by Dominic Bugatti and Frank Musker. It was recorded and released almost simultaneously by Welsh singer Bonnie Tyler (claimed as the original) and American Bette Midler. Due to the simultaneous release, both versions competed with each other. As a result, Tyler's version reached number 35 in the UK, while Midler's version charted in North America, including number 40 in the US Hot 100.

Tyler's version became the title theme for Robert William Young's 1979 film The World Is Full of Married Men.

== Critical reception ==
A review by Cash Box magazine noted that Tyler's version is a percolating disco number with sleek arrangements, her voice mixed well above the echoed synthesizer and handclaps which jump out of the instrumentals, and mellifluous instrumentals sure to get disco wallflowers out onto the dance floor. The reviewer of Record World wrote: "Bonnie's tough vocals ask and give no quarter on this soulful, driving disco/pop piece that has strong a/c potential. The saucy sax adds to the passion."

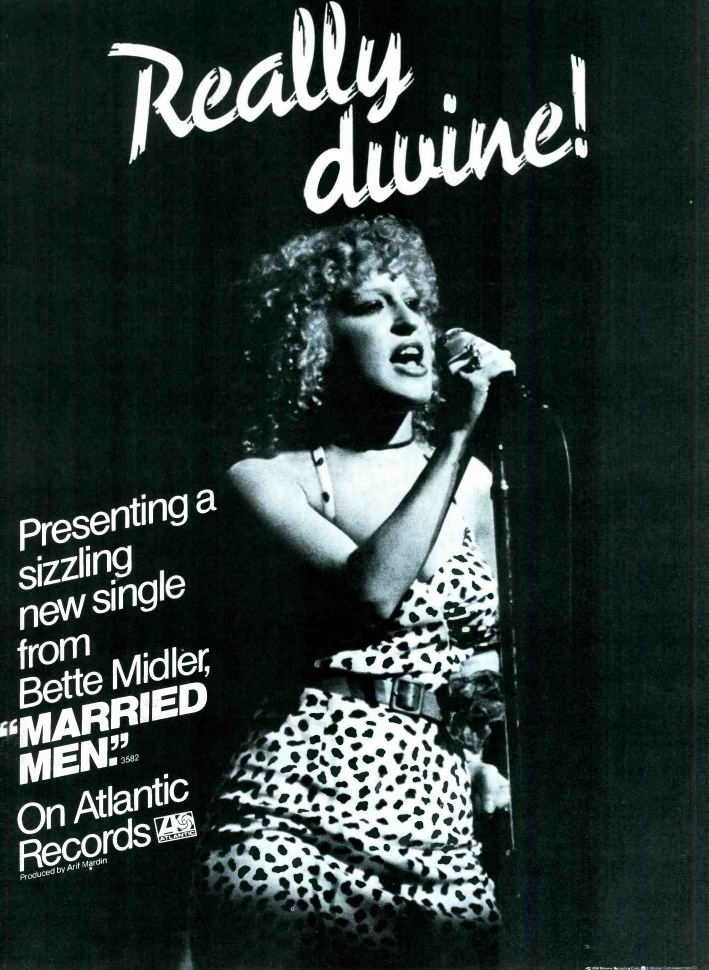
An advertisement for the Midler's version in Cash Box magazine, June 1979.

Commenting on Midler's performance, Billboard magazine noted that this polished disco record best emphasizes the singer's energy. Brian Chin of Record World wrote: "Arif Mardin produced, and gives full orchestral support to a strong, strong punchline ('They do it, they do it'), which Midler belts out with a force that nearly wears her voice to a frazzle by the end of the song. There are hints of 'Sinner Man' and 'Da Ya Think I'm Sexy,' but in the end, the song's own pop identity makes the biggest mark. This is especially true in that 'Married Men' lacks the bonafide disco mix and edit that, say, 'Take Me Home' received. Midler's record would make a stronger dance impact with longer breaks (the several guitar and syndrum breaks don't last nearly long enough to provide a real change) and with a more varied mix and programming. Still, excellent songwriting and Midler's personal presence make 'Married Men' a radio must, and, given the exposure, could cross back into the clubs on requests."

== Track listing ==
=== Bonnie Tyler ===
7" single
A. "Married Men" – 3:45
B. "If You Ever Need Me Again" (Ronnie Scott, Steve Wolfe) – 3:32

12" single
A. "Married Men" – 6:10
B. "If You Ever Need Me Again" – 3:32

=== Bette Midler ===
7" single
A. "Married Men" – 3:35
B. "Bang, You're Dead" (Nicholas Ashford, Valerie Simpson) – 3:10

12" single
A. "Married Men" – 7:58
B. "Bang, You're Dead" – 3:10

== Charts ==
Chart performance for "Married Men" by Bonnie Tyler
Chart (1979)	Peak position
Australia (Kent Music Report)	84
Spain (AFYVE)	19
UK Singles (Record Mirror)	35

Chart performance for "Married Men" by Bette Midler
Chart (1979)	Peak position
Australia (Kent Music Report)	37
Canada (RPM Top Singles)	81
US Billboard Hot 100	40
US Disco Top 80 (Billboard)	32
US Cash Box Top 100	46
US Top Singles (Record World)	65
US Disco File Top 50 (Record World)	39
