= Gypsy (1993 soundtrack) =

Soundtrack album by Bette Midler
- Released: November 23, 1993
- Length: 54:39
- Label: Atlantic
- Producers: Arif Mardin; Michael Rafter; Curt Sobel

Bette Midler chronology
Experience the Divine: Greatest Hits (1993)	Gypsy (1993)	Bette of Roses (1995)

Gypsy is the soundtrack to the 1993 television adaptation of Gypsy. It was released by Atlantic Records on November 23, 1993, in the United States. Based on the autobiography of Gypsy Rose Lee and the 1959 musical Gypsy: A Musical Fable, written by Jule Styne and Stephen Sondheim, it depicts the life and times of a burlesque stripper and her domineering mother, starring Bette Midler as Mama Rose.

Despite the fact that the film only aired on the CBS network in the US and the soundtrack only featured Midler on seven of the seventeen tracks, it was released as a Bette Midler album by Atlantic Records. The soundtrack peaked at number 183 on US Billboard 200 but failed to chart elsewhere.

== Critical reception ==
AllMusic editor William Ruhlmann found that Midler "was too accustomed to being ingratiating and sympathetic to be as much of a monster as Rose is supposed to be, and she didn't quite have the voice for the more demanding songs [...] In the more confrontational numbers, such as "Some People" and "Everything's Coming Up Roses," she didn't go far enough [...] On the whole, then, Midler did a respectable job, but not the one she was capable of, if she had worked harder. As such, this Gypsy, while a vast improvement over the disastrous movie soundtrack, was on a par with the Tyne Daly revival."

== Track listing ==
Gypsy track listing
No.	Title	Performer(s)	Length
1.	"Overture"		4:56
2.	"May We Entertain You"	Lacey Chabert; Elisabeth Moss	5:02
3.	"Some People"	Bette Midler	3:16
4.	"Small World"	Midler; Peter Riegert	3:23
5.	"Baby June and Her Newsboys"	Chabert; Moss; Joey Ceo; Blake Armstrong; Teo Weiner	2:08
6.	"Mr. Goldstone"	Midler; Riegert; Jennifer Beck; Jeffrey Broadhurst; Peter Lockyer; Michael Moore; Patrick Boyd	2:27
7.	"Little Lamb"	Cynthia Gibb	2:20
8.	"You'll Never Get Away From Me"	Midler; Riegert	2:57
9.	"Dainty June and Her Farmboys"	Beck; Broadhurst; Peter Lockyer; Moore; Boyd; Terry Lindholm; Gregg Russell; Cynthia Gibb	4:36
10.	"If Momma Was Married"	Beck; Gibb	2:56
11.	"All I Need Is the Girl"	Broadhurst	4:58
12.	"Everything's Coming Up Roses"	Midler	2:50
13.	"Together (Wherever We Go)"	Midler; Riegert; Gibb	2:58
14.	"You Gotta Get a Gimmick"	Linda Hart; Anna McNeely; Christine Ebersole	4:07
15.	"Let Me Entertain You"	Gibb	2:33
16.	"Rose's Turn"	Midler	4:05
17.	"End Credits"		3:10

== Personnel ==
Musicians

- Lacey Chabert – vocals (Baby June)
- Elisabeth Moss – vocals (Baby Louise)
- Bette Midler – vocals (Rose)
- Peter Riegert – vocals (Herbie)
- Joey Ceo – vocals (newsboy)
- Blake Armstrong – vocals (newsboy)
- Teo Weiner – vocals (newsboy)
- Jeffrey Broadhurst – vocals (Tulsa)
- Peter Lockyer – vocals (Yonkers)
- Michael Moore – vocals (L.A.)
- Patrick Boyd – vocals (Kansas)
- Cynthia Gibb – vocals (Louise/Gypsy)
- Jennifer Beck – vocals (June)
- Terry Lindholm – vocals (Flagstaff)
- Gregg Russell – vocals (farmboy)
- Linda Hart – vocals (Mazeppa)
- Anna McNeely – vocals (Electra)
- Christine Ebersole – vocals (Tessie Tura)

Production

- Arif Mardin – record producer
- Michael Rafter – producer
- Curt Sobel – producer
- Robert Schaper Jr – sound engineer
- David Ronne – engineer
- Matthew John McFadden – engineer
- Peggy Names – engineer
- Recorded at Capitol Studios, Hollywood, California

== Charts ==
Chart performance for Gypsy
Chart (1993)	Peak position
US Billboard 200	175
