= Gil Rodin =

American jazz musician

Gilbert Alfred Rodin (December 9, 1902 – June 10, 1974) was an American jazz saxophonist, songwriter, and record producer. He was born in the Russian Empire.

== Career ==
Rodin was raised in Chicago, Illinois, United States. Rodin studied saxophone, clarinet, flute, and trumpet as a youngster. He played in Chicago with Art Kahn in the middle of the 1920s. He moved to California, and played with Harry Bastin before joining Ben Pollack in 1927, remaining in his band until 1934. Concomitantly, Rodin did studio work and played with Red Nichols's radio band. He made his only recordings as a leader in 1930-31, amounting to four tracks which included Jack Teagarden on vocals, as well as Eddie Miller and Benny Goodman as sidemen.

After the dissolution of Pollack's band in 1935, Rodin played with some of the players in the group until Bob Crosby regrouped them into his ensemble; Rodin remained with Crosby through 1942, when he was drafted. While serving in the Army in World War II, Rodin played in the Artillery Band; after his discharge he played with Ray Bauduc (1944–45) and then with Crosby again.

Later in his career, Rodin did work in radio and television production, with Bill Cosby among others. He produced the soundtracks to the films American Graffiti and The Sting.

== Compositions ==
His best-known composition is "Big Noise from Winnetka", for which he and Bob Crosby added lyrics to already-existing music by Ray Bauduc and Bob Haggart. The song has appeared in the films Raging Bull (1980) directed by Martin Scorsese, the 1982 film Cannery Row, Woody Allen's Manhattan Murder Mystery (1993), Saving Mr. Banks (2013), and What If (2013), though the lyrics are not necessarily included in all of these.
