= Big Noise from Winnetka =

Jazz song

"Big Noise from Winnetka" is a jazz song co-written by composer and bass player Bob Haggart and drummer Ray Bauduc, who were members of a sub-group of the Bob Crosby Orchestra called "The Bobcats". They also were the first to record it, in 1938. That recording is remarkable for being an unusual kind of duet: at first Haggart whistles the melody and plays the bass, accompanied only by Bauduc on the drums; however, halfway through the drum solo, Bauduc starts drumming on the strings of the bass while Haggart performs the left-hand fingering, combining to create a percussive bass solo. Though the original version has only bass and drums (with the bass player whistling), many other arrangements have been performed, including one by the Bob Crosby big band with the band's vocal group, for which Gil Rodin and Bob Crosby added lyrics to the instrumental original.

After the success of its initial recording, Haggart and Bauduc performed this number frequently for the rest of their careers, including in several films, most notably in 1941's Let's Make Music and 1943's Reveille with Beverly. The original recording was featured on the soundtrack of Raging Bull. Nick Nolte and Debra Winger danced to a version credited to Bob Crosby and the Bobcats in the 1982 film Cannery Row.

== Composition ==
This was a spontaneous composition, created at the Blackhawk in Chicago in 1938. When some of the band were late getting back from a break, Haggart and Bauduc started free improvising while they waited and "Big Noise" was the result. It was a joint composition, later formalized by arranger Haggart. Later, lyrics were written by Gil Rodin and Bob Crosby.

Winnetka, Illinois is an affluent North Shore suburb located approximately 16 miles (26 km) north of downtown Chicago.

== Performances ==
- 1959: Jazz drummer Gene Krupa covered the song on his live album Big Noise from Winnetka.
- 1959: Jack Teagarden with drummer Ronnie Greb covered the song on his live album At the Roundtable.
- 1962: Kenny Ball, on his Midnight in Moscow album
- 1963: Jazz drummer Cozy Cole's version Bubbled Under in the American Billboard Charts at position 121.
- 1963: Eddy Mitchell sang a French version ("Quand une Fille me plaît") on his album Voici Eddy... c'était le soldat Mitchell.
- 1965: Chico Hamilton recorded his own version on the album The Dealer.
- 1966: Kenny Clare & Ronnie Stephenson, Drum Spectacular
- 1970: Scottish progressive rock band Clouds performed a version on their album "Up Above Our Heads".
- 1974-1975 Spaghetti Head (Leslie George, William Hurdle) underground disco/house instrumental on Private Stock Records
- 1979: The song was covered by Bette Midler for her album Thighs and Whispers and released as a 12" single, the song lasting 6:56, and it peaked at No. 98 on the U.S. Dance Charts. The song was also performed in her concert film Divine Madness and is included on the soundtrack album (3:52). The song was included during her Las Vegas show, The Showgirl Must Go On (2008–2010).
- 1980: The song was featured in the field repertoire of the Bridgemen Drum & Bugle Corps (Bayonne, New Jersey). The Bridgemen missed winning that season's Drum Corps International world championship title by 0.55.
- 1984: The Australian teenage indie band the Lighthouse Keepers recorded a version of "Big Noise" featuring a C melody sax on their album Tales of the Unexpected.
- 1999: A cover of the opening few seconds of the song are sung by the character Phoebe Sparrow in episode 56 of the British TV series Goodnight Sweetheart, "Something Fishie".
- 2002: The Japanese jazz group Ego-Wrappin' covered the song on their album Night Food.
- 2005: Bassist Kyle Eastwood recorded an arrangement on his album Paris Blue.
- 2008: The Austin, Texas band Asylum Street Spankers covered the song on their album What? And Give Up Show Biz?.
- 2009: In the UK, the song has been used in advertisements for direct.gov.uk.
- 2013: Miss Florida did a baton routine to the song in the Miss America pageant.
- 2013: The song was featured in the Macy's Thanksgiving Day Parade by the University of Massachusetts Minuteman Marching Band.
- 2015: Christine Ebersole, a singer and actress, brought her show Big Noise from Winnetka back to the Chicago area. The show included the jazz song and stories from her life in Winnetka, Illinois.

== In popular culture ==
- According to an interview with Canadian animator Danny Antonucci, the theme song for his hit Cartoon Network show Ed, Edd n Eddy was inspired by "Big Noise" and includes a similar bass line and whistled melody.
