= My Mother's Eyes (song) =

- Japanese picture sleeve

Single by Bette Midler

from the album Divine Madness
- B-side: "Chapel of Love"
- Released: November 1980
- Genre: Pop
- Length: 2:24
- Label: Atlantic
- Songwriter(s): Tom Jans
- Producer(s): Dennis Kirk

Bette Midler singles chronology
"The Rose" (1979)	"My Mother's Eyes" (1980)	"Chapel of Love" (1980)

"My Mother's Eyes" is a song by American singer Bette Midler, taken from her 1980 live album Divine Madness. The song was released as a single in November of the same year with the song "Chapel of Love" on the flip side. It reached number 39 on the Billboard Hot 100 and number 8 on the Adult Contemporary chart.

== Critical reception ==
The Billboard magazine reviewer stated that "this is a sincerely rendered ballad with the kind of torchy lyrics that go well with Midler's vocal stylings and the striking musical support."

== Track listing ==
7" single
A. "My Mother's Eyes" – 2:24
B. "Chapel of Love" (Ellie Greenwich, Jeff Barry, Phil Spector) – 1:55

== Charts ==
Chart performance for "My Mother's Eyes"
Chart (1980–81)	Peak position
Australia (Kent Music Report)	59
New Zealand (Recorded Music NZ)	34
US Billboard Hot 100	39
US Adult Contemporary (Billboard)	8
US Cash Box Top 100	42
US Top Singles (Record World)	47
US A/C Chart (Record World)	23
