= Thighs and Whispers =

Studio album by Bette Midler
- Released: October 1979
- Recorded: 1979
- Studio: Atlantic Recording Studios (New York, NY)
- Genre: Disco, pop
- Length: 42:12
- Label: Atlantic
- Producer: Arif Mardin

Bette Midler chronology
The Best of Bette (1978)	Thighs and Whispers (1979)	The Rose (1979)

Singles from Thighs and Whispers
- 1. "Married Men"; 2. "Hang on in There Baby"; 3. "My Knight in Black Leather"; 4. "Big Noise from Winnetka"

Thighs and Whispers is the fifth studio album by American singer Bette Midler. Released in 1979, the album reached No. 65 on the Billboard Pop Albums chart.

== Production and release ==
The album was largely disco-influenced. It saw Midler reunite with producer Arif Mardin and includes Jerry Ragovoy's "My Knight in Black Leather", a minor dance-floor hit that peaked at #70 on the US dance charts. "Married Men", "Hang on in There Baby" and "My Knight in Black Leather", released at the height of the disco era, were all issued as extended mixes on 12-inch singles. The album's title is a humorous play on Cries and Whispers, influential Swedish film-maker Ingmar Bergman's 1973 movie.

The song "Millworker", written by James Taylor, is from the short-lived Broadway production of Working. Midler's recording of "Married Men" reached the top 40 of the U.S. Club Play Singles chart. The song was also a UK top 40 hit for Bonnie Tyler the same year. Tyler's version was the theme to the British film The World Is Full of Married Men.

While the singles and the album itself were largely overlooked at the time, "Big Noise From Winnetka" has since served as the opening number on many of Midler's tours. The song was originally a swing classic recorded by Bob Crosby and the Bobcats, Gene Krupa and several others in the late 1930s.

The album was released on CD in 1990. A remastered version of the album was released by Atlantic Records/Warner Music in 1995.

== Critical reception ==
Professional ratings
Review scores
Source	Rating
AllMusic	2/5 stars
Christgau's Record Guide	C+
The Rolling Stone Album Guide	2/5 stars

The album has received mixed reviews from music critics. Robert Christgau gave the album a C+ and wrote a humorous review in which he wrote that "the songs are pretty good, and when you listen up they get better" but conclude that "the songs aren't that good. And they don't get that much better." Stephen Holden of Rolling Stone wrote that the album "is the most convincing proof yet that Bette Midler is a stage personality in the tradition of Ethel Merman and Liza Minnelli, entertainers whose talents can't be captured in a recording studio either." The Globe and Mail concluded that "the very title of this album alone indicates that Bette Midler is still trying to be better known for being Bette Midler than she is for being a great pop singer, and the music found on the album still shows that she isn't yet sure who or what Bette Midler is supposed to be."

AllMusic's Joe Viglione retrospectively wrote that despite Midler being in fine voice and "such a consistent and dynamic artist" the release is "an uneven album" but "still has its moments."

== Track listing ==
Side one

1. "Big Noise from Winnetka" (Ray Bauduc, Bob Crosby, Bob Haggart, Gil Rodin) – 6:56
2. "Millworker" (James Taylor) – 4:07
3. "Cradle Days" (Tony Berg, Aaron Neville) – 5:05
4. "My Knight in Black Leather" (Jerry Ragovoy) – 4:53

Side two

1. "Hang on in There Baby" (Johnny Bristol) – 6:04
2. "Hurricane" (Randy Kerber, Bette Midler) – 7:30
3. "Rain" (Mac Rebennack) – 3:58
4. "Married Men" (Dominic Bugatti, Frank Musker) – 3:47

== Personnel ==
- Jonathan Abramowitz – strings
- Lamar Alsop – whistling
- Phillip Ballou – background vocals
- Errol "Crusher" Bennett – percussion, congas
- Warren Bernhardt – piano, electric piano
- Phil Bodner – clarinet, reeds, saxophone
- Michael Brecker – reeds, saxophone, tenor saxophone
- Randy Brecker – trumpet
- Eddie Brigati – background vocals
- Joe Caro – guitar, electric guitar
- Robin Clark – background vocals
- William Coupon – photography
- Rafael Cruz – percussion
- Eddie Daniels – reeds, saxophone, alto saxophone
- Lew DelGatto – reeds, saxophone
- Jimmy Douglass – engineer
- Jon Faddis – trumpet
- Steve Ferrone – drums
- Sammy Figueroa – percussion
- Babi Floyd – background vocals
- Arthur Freeman – background vocals
- John Frosk – trumpet
- John Gale – trombone
- Billy Gray – background vocals
- Diva Gray – background vocals, obbligato vocals
- Robin Grean – background vocals
- Lewis Hahn – engineer, mixing
- Carl Hall – background vocals
- Ula Hedwig – background vocals
- Stephen Innocenzi – remixing
- Anthony Jackson – bass
- Arthur Jenkins – electric piano
- Jack Jennings – percussion, marimba, background vocals
- Randy Kerber – synthesizer, piano, electric piano, mellotron
- Will Lee – bass
- Bernie Leighton – piano
- Jesse Levy – cello
- Mel Lewis – drums, tom-tom
- Tom "Bones" Malone – trombone
- Arif Mardin – producer, percussion, conductor, horn arrangements
- George Marge – reeds, saxophone
- Jim Maxwell – bagpipes
- Bette Midler – vocals, background vocals
- Merle Miller – background vocals
- Jeff Mironov – guitar
- Michael O'Reilly – assistant engineer
- Gene Orloff – concertmaster
- Gene Pau – engineer
- Jerry Ragovoy – producer
- Katey Sagal – background vocals
- Marc Shaiman – vocal arrangement
- Jocelyn Shaw – background vocals
- Alan Shulman – strings
- Billy Slapin – reeds, saxophone
- David Spinozza – acoustic guitar, guitar
- Danny Stiles – trumpet
- Richard Tee – piano
- Fonzi Thornton – background vocals
- David Tofani – reeds, saxophone
- Luther Vandross – background vocals
- Ed Walsh – synthesizer
- Bobby Warner – engineer
- Willie Weeks – bass
- Frank Wess – reeds, saxophone
- Ken Williams – bass vocals
- George Young – reeds, saxophone
- Sandi Young – art direction
- Albert Izzo – drums
- Peter Ballin – saxophone

== Charts ==
Chart performance for Thighs and Whispers
Chart (1979)	Peak position
Australian Albums (Kent Music Report)	28
Swedish Albums (Sverigetopplistan)	28
US Billboard 200	65
US Top 100 Albums (Cash Box)	64
US The Album Chart (Record World)	113

== Release history ==
Year	Label	Format	Catalog
1979	Atlantic	LP	–
1990	Atlantic	CD	16004
1995	Atlantic/WEA	Remastered CD	82786
2005	Atlantic	CD	CD-16004
