= The Rose (film soundtrack) =

The Rose (soundtrack)

Soundtrack album by Bette Midler
- Released: December 3, 1979
- Genres: Vocal, rock, blues
- Length: 39:02
- Label: Atlantic
- Producer: Paul A. Rothchild

Bette Midler chronology
| Thighs and Whispers (1979) | The Rose (soundtrack) (1979) | Divine Madness (1980) |

Singles from The Rose
- 1. "When a Man Loves a Woman" Released: 1980; 2. "The Rose" Released: 1980

Professional ratings
Review scores
| Source | Rating |
|---|---|
| AllMusic | 4.5/5 stars |
| Christgau's Record Guide | C |
| The Rolling Stone Album Guide | 3/5 stars |

The Rose is the soundtrack to the feature film of the same name starring Bette Midler, released in 1979.

== Background ==
Midler performs all the songs on the album, with the exception of the instrumental "Camellia". Apart from the title track, the soundtrack was entirely recorded live and also features concert monologues, with Midler portraying the character The Rose, loosely based on blues singer Janis Joplin. The soundtrack was produced by Paul A. Rothchild, who in fact also had worked with Joplin on what was to become her final album before her death in 1970, entitled Pearl and released posthumously. Midler's portrayal of The Rose, which was her acting debut, earned her an Oscar nomination for Best Actress in 1980 and became the start of her career in movies.

== Release and promotion ==
The first single to be lifted off the soundtrack was Midler's rendition of Percy Sledge's "When a Man Loves a Woman" which peaked at No. 35 on Billboard's single chart. The studio-recorded title track (written by Amanda McBroom) which closes the album became a top three hit for Midler, and also a number-one hit on the Adult Contemporary chart, and is considered one of her signature tunes. The alternate single version with orchestral overdubs was not included on the actual soundtrack but later appeared on hits compilations like Experience the Divine along with "When a Man Loves a Woman". One track featured in the film, Bob Seger's "Fire Down Below", was omitted from the album but Midler recorded a second live version of the song later in 1980 for the soundtrack to her concert documentary Divine Madness. "Keep On Rockin'" was the second Sammy Hagar track Midler recorded, his hard rock track "Red" was featured on her 1977 studio album Broken Blossom. The Rose soundtrack also included one song that since its original release has become a mainstay in Midler's live repertoire, Jerry Ragovoy's blues ballad "Stay with Me".

The Rose peaked at number 12 on Billboard's album chart in the Spring of 1980, making it Midler's bestselling album since 1973's Bette Midler.

The album was digitally remastered and reissued on CD by Atlantic Records/Warner Music in 1995.

== Track listing ==
All tracks recorded live unless otherwise noted

Side A

1. "Whose Side Are You On?" (Kenny Hopkins, Charley Williams) - 4:30
2. "Midnight In Memphis" (Tony Johnson) - 3:44
3. Concert Monologue - 2:22
4. "When a Man Loves a Woman" (Calvin Lewis, Andrew Wright) - 5:20
5. "Sold My Soul To Rock 'N' Roll" (Gene Pistilli) - 3:42
6. "Keep On Rockin'" (Sammy Hagar, John Carter) - 4:03

Side B

1. "Love Me with a Feeling" (Hudson Whittaker) - 3:54
2. "Camellia" (Steve Hunter) - 3:25
3. Homecoming Monologue - 1:23
4. "Stay with Me" (Jerry Ragovoy, George David Weiss) - 5:42
5. "Let Me Call You Sweetheart" (Beth Slater Whitson, Leo Friedman) - 1:35
6. "The Rose" (Studio recording - album version) (Amanda McBroom) - 3:42

== Personnel ==
- Bette Midler - lead vocals

The Rose Concert Band

- Danny Weis - guitar
- David Campbell - string arrangements
- Steve Hunter - guitar
- Mark Leonard - bass guitar
- Robbie Buchanan - keyboards
- Pentti "Whitey" Glan - drums
- Norton Buffalo - harmonica & trombone, backing vocals
- Jerry Jumonville - saxophone
- Mark Underwood - trumpet
- Bill Champlin - background vocals
- Donny Gerrard - background vocals

"Love Me With a Feeling" Band

- Greg Prestopino - acoustic guitar
- Bill Elliott - piano
- Jon Sholle - electric guitar
- Scott Chambers - bass
- Harry Stinson - drums

"The Rose" Ensemble

- Lincoln Mayorga - piano
- Amanda McBroom - harmony vocals

== Production ==
- Paul A. Rothchild - record producer, musical arranger, remixing
- William Gazecki - sound engineer, Associate Producer, remixing
- Bob Leonard - engineer
- Roger Mayer - engineer
- Stuart Taylor - engineer
- John Neal - engineer
- Ed Lever - engineer
- Recorded by: The Enactron Truck
- SMPTE Code Processing by: Canyon Recorders
- Remixed at Elektra Sound Recorders by Bill Gazecki, Paul A. Rothchild
- Concerts recorded live during June & July 1978
- Stephen Innocenzi – remastering (1995 reissue)

== Charts ==
=== Weekly charts ===
Weekly chart performance for The Rose
| Chart (1979–1980) | Peak position |
|---|---|
| Australian Albums (Kent Music Report) | 10 |
| Canada Top Albums/CDs (RPM) | 14 |
| Dutch Albums (Album Top 100) | 16 |
| New Zealand Albums (RMNZ) | 19 |
| Norwegian Albums (VG-lista) | 18 |
| Swedish Albums (Sverigetopplistan) | 4 |
| UK Albums (Official Charts) | 68 |
| US Billboard 200 | 12 |
| US Top 100 Albums (Cash Box) | 11 |
| US The Album Chart (Record World) | 12 |

=== Year-end charts ===
Year-end chart performance for The Rose
| Chart (1980) | Position |
|---|---|
| Australian Albums (Kent Music Report) | 7 |
| Canada Top Albums/CDs (RPM) | 58 |
| New Zealand Albums (RMNZ) | 36 |
| US Billboard 200 | 12 |
| US Top 100 Albums (Cash Box) | 33 |
| US Top Soundtrack Albums (Cash Box) | 3 |
| US Top Soundtrack Albums (Record World) | 5 |

== Certifications ==
| Region | Certification | Certified units/sales |
|---|---|---|
| Australia (ARIA) | 3× Platinum | 210,000^{^} |
| France (SNEP) | Gold | 100,000^{*} |
| United States (RIAA) | 2× Platinum | 2,000,000^{^} |
^{*} Sales figures based on certification alone.^{^} Shipments figures based on certification alone.
