= The Divine Miss M =

Studio album by Bette Midler
- Released: November 7, 1972
- Studios: Atlantic, New York, New York
- Genres: Pop; pop rock
- Length: 41:03
- Label: Atlantic
- Producers: Ahmet Ertegün; Barry Manilow; Joel Dorn; Geoffrey Haslam

Bette Midler chronology
The Divine Miss M (1972)	Bette Midler (1973)

Singles from The Divine Miss M
- 1. "Do You Want to Dance?" Released: 1972; 2. "Boogie Woogie Bugle Boy" Released: May 1973; 3. "Friends" Released: 1973

The Divine Miss M is the debut album by American singer and actress Bette Midler, released in 1972 by Atlantic Records. The album's title refers to Midler's well-known stage persona. Produced in collaboration with Barry Manilow, it features tracks that have since become standards in her repertoire, including "Do You Want to Dance?", "Chapel of Love", "Hello In There", "Friends" and "Boogie Woogie Bugle Boy". The cover art was designed by Richard Amsel.

The album achieved commercial success, earning Platinum certification in both the United States and Canada, and received positive reception from critics. It was first released on CD in 1990, followed by a remastered version in 1995 by Atlantic Records/Warner Music. A deluxe remastered edition was issued in October 2016.

== Background and production ==
Midler began singing in the Continental Baths, a gay bathhouse in New York City's Ansonia Hotel, in the summer of 1970. During this time, she became close to her piano accompanist, Barry Manilow, who co-produced the album. It was during her time at the Continental Baths that she built up a core following and many of the album's songs were sung by her in her live performances.

The song "Boogie Woogie Bugle Boy" became a successful rock cover of the classic swing tune originally introduced and popularized in 1941 by the Andrews Sisters, to whom Midler has repeatedly referred as her idols and inspiration, as far back as her first appearances on The Tonight Show Starring Johnny Carson. Midler told Johnny Carson in an interview that she always wanted to move like the sisters, and Patty Andrews remembered: "When I first heard the introduction on the radio, I thought it was our old record. When Bette opened at the Amphitheater in Los Angeles, Maxene and I went backstage to see her. Her first words were, 'What else did you record?'" During another Midler concert, Maxene went on stage and presented her with an honorary bugle. Bette recorded other Andrews Sisters hits, including "In the Mood" and "Lullaby of Broadway".

Several tracks were recorded for The Divine Miss M that did not make the final cut, like: "For Free," "He Was Too Good to Me," "Empty Bed Blues," "My Freedom And I," "I Shall Be Released," "A Teenager In Love," as well as "Old Cape Cod," and "Marijuana," which were later released on Bette's 3rd album, Songs For The New Depression. Early promotional DJ copies of the album featured “Hello in There” switched with “Daytime Hustler” but that was altered due to there being three emotional ballads all on the same side.

== Releases ==
Atlantic Records issued an deluxe edition (catalog #R2-556905) of the album in 2016. The 2-disc reissue pairs the remastered original album with nine bonus tracks, including five previously unreleased recordings. Among these are alternate versions of "Superstar" and early mixes of "Marahuana" and "Old Cape Cod" (later reworked for Songs for the New Depression), plus demos of "Mr. Freedom and I" and "Saturday Night". Four single mixes are also featured: "Do You Want to Dance", "Chapel of Love", "Boogie Woogie Bugle Boy", and "Friends", each sourced from their original Atlantic 7" releases (cat. #2928, #2964, and #2980). The set includes new liner notes by Bette Midler, offering context for these rarities.

The album was released in a quadraphonic edition (catalog #QD 7238) the same year as its original mono and stereo versions. In his review of this quadraphonic edition's CD release, Joe Marchese of The Second Disc noted that the quadraphonic mix of The Divine Miss M unveils new layers of the original production through immersive 4.0 spatialization, with instruments and vocals meticulously positioned across discrete channels. In "Do You Want to Dance," Manilow's piano, Ron Carter's bass, and Thom Bell's strings are strategically placed, while Bette's breathy vocals and call-and-response backing singers gain three-dimensional depth. Tracks like "Superstar" heighten drama with upfront voice and piano contrasted by rear-channel horns and strings, while "Daytime Hustler" isolates congas and guitar in the back against frontal organ leads. The original "Friends" disperses vocal overdubs across speakers (with Bette starting in the rear right channel), and "Boogie Woogie Bugle Boy" bounces Andrews Sisters-style harmonies around the soundfield, recreating a theatrical chaos absent from mono/stereo versions. Tom Dowd's mix preserves extended ad-libs and instrumental nuances, transforming the album into a dynamic surround experience that channels the live energy of Midler's early '70s performances.

== Critical reception ==
Professional ratings
Review scores
Source	Rating
AllMusic	4.5/5 stars
Christgau's Record Guide	A−
Q	4/5 stars
The Rolling Stone Album Guide	4/5 stars

The album has received acclaim by music critics. Mark Deming from AllMusic website retrospectively wrote that "while Midler was and is best known for her outgoing stage persona, numbers like "Am I Blue" and "Do You Want to Dance?" demonstrate how much emotional heat she can bring to a torch song, and her interpretations of "Delta Dawn" and "Hello in There" are powerful, moving stuff, portraying their characters with a palpable compassion and nuance" he also said that the album "is her best album" because it "captured the many facets of her musical personality beautifully and showed her quirks were a rich part of what made her music so powerful." Music critic Robert Christgau gave the album an A− in a contemporary review, and pointed out that the album and the tracks selected are "a production that suggests its nutty quality without distracting from her voice, a rich instrument of surprising precision, simultaneously delicate and vulgar."

== Commercial performance ==
The Divine Miss M reached the Top Ten on Billboard's album chart and was later awarded a Platinum Disc by the RIAA, It featured three hit singles—"Do You Want to Dance?", "Friends", and "Boogie Woogie Bugle Boy"—the third of which became Midler's first No. 1 Adult Contemporary hit. In 1973, the album won Midler a Grammy Award for Best New Artist. "Do You Want to Dance?", "Boogie Woogie Bugle Boy" and "Friends" were all Top 40 hit singles from the album, with "Boogie Woogie Bugle Boy" climbing to No. 8 on the Billboard Hot 100 and reaching No. 1 on Billboard's Adult Contemporary chart.

== Track listing ==
Side one
No.	Title	Writer(s)	Length
1.	"Do You Want to Dance?"	Bobby Freeman	2:44
2.	"Chapel Of Love"	Jeff Barry, Ellie Greenwich, Phil Spector	2:55
3.	"Superstar"	Bonnie Bramlett, Leon Russell	5:11
4.	"Daytime Hustler"	Jeff Kent	3:34
5.	"Am I Blue?"	Harry Akst, Grant Clarke	5:25

Side two
No.	Title	Writer(s)	Length
6.	"Friends (Session 1)"	Mark Klingman, Buzzy Linhart	2:50
7.	"Hello In There"	John Prine	4:17
8.	"Leader of the Pack"	George Morton, Barry, Greenwich	3:30
9.	"Delta Dawn"	Larry Collins, Alex Harvey	5:18
10.	"Boogie Woogie Bugle Boy"	Don Raye, Hughie Prince	2:25
11.	"Friends (Session 2)"	Klingman, Linhart	2:54

2016 deluxe edition disc 2
No.	Title	Writer(s)	Length
1.	"Chapel of Love" (Single Mix)	Jeff Barry, Ellie Greenwich, Phil Spector	2:44
2.	"Boogie Woogie Bugle Boy" (Single Version)	Don Raye, Hughie Prince	2:18
3.	"Do You Want to Dance?" (Single Mix)	Bobby Freeman	2:55
4.	"Friends" (Single Mix)	Mark Klingman, Buzzy Linhart	2:59
5.	"Old Cape Cod" (Earliest Recording & Mix)	Claire Rothrock, Milton Yakus, Allan Jeffrey	2:52
6.	"Marahuana" (Earliest Recording & Mix)	Arthur Johnston, Sam Coslow	2:32
7.	"Superstar" (Alternate Recording)	Bonnie Bramlett, Leon Russell	5:08
8.	"Saturday Night" (Demo)	Randy Meisner, Don Henley, Glenn Frey, Bernie Leadon	3:09
9.	"Mr. Freedom & I" (Demo)	Mark Klingman	3:01

== Personnel ==
- Bette Midler – lead vocals
- Cissy Houston – backing vocals, track: A1
- Tender Loving Care (Renelle Broxton, Diedre Tuck, Beverly McKenzie) – backing vocals, track: A1
- Gail Kantor – backing vocals, tracks: A2 to A4, B3, B4, B6
- Melissa Manchester – backing vocals, tracks: A2 to A4, B3, B4, B6
- Merle Miller – backing vocals, tracks: A2 to A4, B3, B4, B6
- Barry Manilow – piano and rhythm track
- Pat Rebillot – piano, track B1
- Dickie Frank, David Spinozza – guitar
- Ron Carter – bass guitar
- Michael Federal – bass guitar, backing vocals track B4
- Ray Lucas – drums
- Kevin Ellman – drums
- Ralph MacDonald – percussion instruments
- Thom Bell – horn and string arrangement, track A1
- Gene Orloff – violin, track B1
- Emanuel Green – violin, track B1
- Selwart Clarke – viola, track B1
- Kermit Moore – cello, track B1
- William S. Fischer – string arrangement, track B1
- Don Arnone – guitar, track B5
- Dick Hyman – piano, track B5
- Milt Hinton – bass guitar, track B5
- Ted Sommer – drums, track B5
- Marty Nelson – vocal arranger, track B5
- Arif Mardin – arrangement, track B5

== Production ==
- Ahmet Ertegün – producer, tracks: A2 to A4, B3, B4, B6
- Barry Manilow – producer, tracks: A2 to A4, B3, B4, B6
- Geoffrey Haslam – producer, tracks: A2 to A4, B3, B4, B6
- Joel Dorn – producer, tracks: A1, A5, B1, B2, B5
- Lew Hahn – recording engineer
- Barry Manilow – musical arranger, musical conductor
- Richard Amsel – cover illustration
- Richard Mantel – cover art direction & design
- Kenn Duncan – backliner photo
- Remixed by Geoffrey Haslam, Lew Hahn, Bob Liftin
- Remixed at Regent Sound Studios and Atlantic Studios
- Recorded at Atlantic Recording Studios, New York.

== Charts ==
=== Weekly charts ===
Weekly chart performance for The Divine Miss M
Chart (1972–1973)	Peak position
Australian Albums (Kent Music Report)	10
Canada Top Albums/CDs (RPM)	5
Japanese Albums (Oricon)	58
US Billboard 200	9
US Top 100 Albums (Cash Box)	8
US The Album Chart (Record World)	8

=== Year-end charts ===
Year-end chart performance for The Divine Miss M
Chart (1973)	Position
US Top 100 Albums (Cash Box)	42

== Certifications and sales ==
Certifications for The Divine Miss M
Region	Certification	Certified units/sales
Australia (ARIA)	Platinum	50,000^{^}
Canada (Music Canada)	Platinum	100,000^{^}
United States (RIAA)	Platinum	1,000,000^{^}
^{^} Shipments figures based on certification alone.
