= Bette Midler (album) =

Studio album by Bette Midler
- Released: November 16, 1973
- Recorded: 1973
- Studio: Atlantic Recording Studios (New York, NY)
- Genre: Vocal
- Length: 32:32
- Label: Atlantic
- Producer: Arif Mardin, Barry Manilow

Bette Midler chronology
The Divine Miss M (1972)	Bette Midler (1973)	Songs for the New Depression (1976)

Singles from Bette Milder
- 1. "In the Mood"

Professional ratings
Review scores
Source	Rating
Allmusic	link
Christgau's Record Guide	B+
The Rolling Stone Album Guide	3.5/5 stars

Bette Midler is the second studio album by American singer Bette Midler, released in 1973 on the Atlantic Records label. Produced by Arif Mardin and Barry Manilow, Bette Midler includes Midler's interpretations of Johnny Mercer and Hoagy Carmichael's "Skylark", Berthold Brecht and Kurt Weill's "Surabaya Johnny", Bob Dylan's "I Shall Be Released", and Glenn Miller's "In the Mood" as well as a Phil Spector medley.

Bette Midler reached No. 6 on the US albums chart and was later awarded a Gold Disc by the RIAA.

The album was released on CD for the first time in 1989. A remastered version of the album was released by Atlantic Records/Warner Music in 1995.

== Track listing ==
Side one
No.	Title	Writer(s)	Length
1.	"Skylark"	Hoagy Carmichael, Johnny Mercer	3:02
2.	"Drinking Again"	Doris Tauber, Mercer	2:48
3.	"Breaking Up Somebody's Home"	Al Jackson Jr., Timothy Matthews	3:49
4.	"Surabaya Johnny"	Kurt Weill, Bertolt Brecht, Herbert Hartig	4:54
5.	"I Shall Be Released"	Bob Dylan	4:56

Side two
No.	Title	Writer(s)	Length
6.	"Optimistic Voices/Lullaby of Broadway"	Herbert Stothart, Harold Arlen, Yip Harburg / Harry Warren, Al Dubin	2:27
7.	"In the Mood"	Joe Garland, Andy Razaf, Wingy Manone	2:39
8.	"Uptown/Don't Say Nothin' Bad (About My Baby)/Da Doo Ron Ron"	Barry Mann, Cynthia Weil / Gerry Goffin, Carole King / Jeff Barry, Ellie Greenwich, Phil Spector	3:23
9.	"Twisted"	Wardell Gray, Annie Ross	2:25
10.	"Higher & Higher (Your Love Keeps Lifting Me)"	Carl Smith, Raynard Miner, Gary Jackson	4:06

== Personnel ==
- Bette Midler – lead vocals
- Barry Manilow – piano, percussion, backing vocals, musical arranger, musical conductor
- Ken Ascher, Don Grolnick, Pat Rebillot – keyboards
- Cornell Dupree, Hugh McCracken, David Spinozza, Frank Vento – guitar
- Will Lee, Chuck Rainey, William Salter, Stu Woods – bass guitar
- Milt Hinton – double bass
- Steve Gadd, Rick Marotta, Bernard Purdie, Grady Tate – drums
- Luther Rix – drums, percussion
- Ralph MacDonald, Arif Mardin – percussion
- Kenneth Bichel – synthesizer
- Gene Orloff – concert master
- Gail Kantor – background vocals
- Merle Miller – background vocals
- Sylvia Shemwell – background vocals
- Myrna Smith – background vocals
- Tasha Thomas – background vocals
- Shirley Brewer – background vocals
- Ann S. Clark – background vocals
- Sharon Redd – background vocals
- Robin Grean – background vocals
- Charlotte Crossley – background vocals

== Production ==
- Arif Mardin – producer
- Barry Manilow – producer
- Gene Paul – recording engineer
- Lew Hahn – recording engineer
- Jimmy Douglass – recording engineer for additional recordings
- Robbert Warner – recording engineer for additional recordings
- Elliot Scheiner – recording engineer for additional recordings
- Buzz Richmond – recording engineer for additional recordings
- Scott Schreckengosf – recording engineer for additional recordings
- George Piros – mastering
- Dennis King – mastering
- Richard Amsel – cover art
- Lee Gurst – backliner photo
- Loring Eutemey – album design
- Recorded at Atlantic Recording Studios, New York, N.Y.
- Additional recordings at A & R Studios, New York, N.Y.; Atlantic Recording Studios, New York, N.Y. & Kaye-Smith Studios, Seattle, Washington
- Re-mixed by: Lew Hahn & Arif Mardin

== Charts ==
=== Weekly charts ===
Weekly chart performance for Bette Midler
Chart (1973–74)	Peak position
Australian Albums (Kent Music Report)	14
Canada Top Albums/CDs (RPM)	3
US Billboard 200	6
US Top 100 Albums (Cash Box)	5
US The Album Chart (Record World)	4

=== Year-end charts ===
1974 year-end chart performance for Bette Midler
Chart (1974)	Position
Canada Top Albums/CDs (RPM)	35
US Billboard 200	87
US Top 100 Albums (Cash Box)	42

== Certifications and sales ==
Region	Certification	Certified units/sales
United States (RIAA)	Gold	500,000^{^}
^{^} Shipments figures based on certification alone.
