= The Rose (song) =

1980 song by Lincoln Mayorga and Amanda McBroom

Song by Lincoln Mayorga and Amanda McBroom

from the album Growing Up in Hollywood Town
- Released: 1980
- Genre: Pop
- Length: 3:04
- Label: Sheffield Lab
- Songwriter: Amanda McBroom
- Producers: Lincoln Mayorga, Doug Sax, Patricia Meredith

"The Rose" is a pop song written by Amanda McBroom. Bette Midler made the song famous when she recorded it for her 1979 film The Rose, in which it plays during the closing credits. It has been recorded multiple times, including by Conway Twitty and Westlife, who had US Country & Western and UK number one hits with the song, respectively. Nana Mouskouri recorded a German version ("Die Rose"), also in 1980, as well as an English version, and in 1986, Sissel Kyrkjebø recorded a Norwegian version ("Frøet") for her debut album, Sissel.

== Background and Bette Midler version ==
"The Rose"

Single by Bette Midler

from the album The Rose
- B-side: "Stay with Me"
- Released: March 1980
- Recorded: 1979
- Genre: Pop
- Length: 3:40
- Label: Atlantic
- Songwriter: Amanda McBroom
- Producer: Paul A. Rothchild

Bette Midler singles chronology
"When a Man Loves a Woman" (1980)	"The Rose" (1980)	"My Mother's Eyes" (1980)

Audio video
- "The Rose" on YouTube

"The Rose" was first recorded by Bette Midler for the soundtrack of the 1979 film The Rose, in which it plays under the closing credits. However, the song was not written for the movie: Amanda McBroom recalls, "I wrote it in 1977 [or] 1978, and I sang it occasionally in clubs. ... Jim Nabors had a local talk show, and I sang ["The Rose"] on his show once." According to McBroom, she wrote "The Rose" in response to her manager's suggestion that she write "some Bob Seger-type tunes" to expedite a record deal: McBroom obliged by writing "The Rose" in 45 minutes. The song is one verse musically repeated three times; McBroom comments: "When I finished it, I realized it doesn't have a bridge or a hook, but I couldn't think of anything to put in there." McBroom believes the song struck a universal nerve because "It's a message of hope that's very easily understandable".

McBroom's composition was one of seven songs selected by Midler from 30 song possibilities proffered by Paul A. Rothchild, the producer of The Rose soundtrack album. Reportedly Rothchild had listened to over 3,000 songs in order to assemble those 30 possibilities.

Released as the second single from The Rose soundtrack album, "The Rose" hit number 1 on the Cashbox Top 100 and peaked at number 3 on the Billboard Hot 100, becoming her second top 10. Additionally, it was number 1 on the Adult Contemporary chart for five weeks running. The single was certified Gold by the RIAA for over a million copies sold in the United States.

Midler won the Grammy Award for Best Female Pop Vocal Performance for "The Rose", beating out formidable competition from Barbra Streisand and Donna Summer among others.

There are two mixes of the song. The single mix features orchestration, while the version in the film (and on its soundtrack) includes an extended introduction and omits the orchestration in favor of piano and vocals only.

"The Rose" did not receive a nomination for the Academy Award for Best Original Song. Despite not having been recorded prior to the soundtrack of the film The Rose, the song had not been written for the film. According to McBroom, AMPAS inquired of her if the song had been written for the movie, and McBroom answered honestly that it had not. McBroom did, however, win the Golden Globe Award for Best Original Song for "The Rose", as that award's governing body, the Hollywood Foreign Press Association (HFPA), did not share AMPAS's official requirement that a nominated song be completely original with its parent film.

In 2004 "The Rose" finished #83 in AFI's 100 Years...100 Songs survey of the top tunes in American cinema.

In 2012, "The Rose" finally entered the UK Singles chart, reaching Number 121.

== Personnel ==
- Bette Midler – lead vocals
- David Campbell – string arrangements
- Lincoln Mayorga – piano
- Amanda McBroom – harmony vocals

== Charts ==
=== Weekly charts ===
Weekly chart performance for "The Rose"
Chart (1980–2015)	Peak position
Australia (Kent Music Report)	6
Canada Top Singles (RPM)	2
Canada Adult Contemporary (RPM)	1
France (SNEP)	54
New Zealand (Recorded Music NZ)	24
US Billboard Hot 100	3
US Adult Contemporary (Billboard)	1
US Cash Box Top 100	1

=== Year-end charts ===
Year-end chart performance for "The Rose"
Chart (1980)	Position
Australia (Kent Music Report)	31
Canada Top Singles (RPM)	9
US Billboard Hot 100	10
US Cash Box Top 100	11

== Certifications ==
Region	Certification	Certified units/sales
Japan (RIAJ) 2005 digital release	Gold	100,000^{*}
New Zealand (RMNZ)	Platinum	30,000^{‡}
United Kingdom (BPI)	Silver	200,000^{‡}
United States (RIAA)	Gold	1,000,000^{^}
^{*} Sales figures based on certification alone.^{^} Shipments figures based on certification alone.^{‡} Sales+streaming figures based on certification alone.

== Conway Twitty version ==
"The Rose"

Single by Conway Twitty

from the album Dream Maker
- B-side: "It's Only Make Believe"
- Released: January 17, 1983
- Genre: Country
- Length: 3:35
- Label: Elektra
- Songwriter: Amanda McBroom
- Producers: Conway Twitty, Jimmy Bowen

Conway Twitty singles chronology
"We Did But Now You Don't" (1982)	"The Rose" (1983)	"We Had It All" (1983)

Audio video
- "The Rose" on YouTube

Country singer Conway Twitty recorded a cover version in 1982. His version, from his album Dream Maker, was a number one country hit in US and Canada; it became his 30th number one single on the US country chart.

=== Track listing ===
7-inch single

1. The Rose – 3:32
2. It's Only Make Believe – 2:18

=== Charts ===
==== Weekly charts ====
Chart (1983)	Peak position
US Hot Country Songs (Billboard)	1
Canada Country Tracks (RPM)	1

==== Year-end charts ====
Chart (1983)	Position
US Hot Country Songs (Billboard)	28

== The Dubliners version ==
"The Rose"

Single by the Dubliners and the Hothouse Flowers

from the album 30 Years A-Greying
- Released: 1991
- Genre: Celtic rock
- Label: London Records
- Songwriter: Amanda McBroom

The Dubliners singles chronology
"Jack's Heroes" (1990)	"The Rose" (1991)	"Red Roses for Me" (1994)

Audio video
- "The Rose" on YouTube

The Dubliners recorded a duet with the Hothouse Flowers for Rose Week and released "The Rose" as a single in 1991, reaching no. 2 in the Irish Singles Chart.

=== Charts ===
Chart (1991)	Peak position
Ireland (Irish Singles Chart)	2

== Westlife version ==
"The Rose"

Single by Westlife

from the album The Love Album
- B-side: "Nothing's Gonna Change My Love for You"; "If"
- Released: November 6, 2006
- Studio: Studios 301 (Stockholm, Sweden); Metropolis (London, England)
- Length: 3:39
- Label: S; Sony BMG; RCA
- Songwriter: Amanda McBroom
- Producer: Quiz & Larossi

Westlife singles chronology
"Amazing" (2006)	"The Rose" (2006)	"Home" (2007)

Music video
- "The Rose" on YouTube

"The Rose" was covered by Irish boy band Westlife and was released as the first and only single from their seventh studio album The Love Album (2006). It reached number one on the UK Singles Chart, becoming the group's 14th and most recent number-one single in the United Kingdom. The single has sold over 200,000 copies in the UK to earn a silver certification from the British Phonographic Industry (BPI).

=== Music video ===
The video for this single was presented in two versions: one in black and white and the other in color. It shows the emotions and events leading up to a couple's wedding procession. The band members are clad in suits and are shown in a checkered-floor room. During the initial period of the video's release, fans were given the opportunity to customise the music video by digitally adding their names to various elements such as the wedding invitation card.

=== Track listings ===
UK CD1 and European CD single

1. "The Rose" – 3:40
2. "Solitaire" – 5:07

UK CD2

1. "The Rose" – 3:40
2. "Nothing's Gonna Change My Love for You" – 3:47
3. "If" – 2:42
4. Making of the photoshoot (enhanced)

=== Charts ===
==== Weekly charts ====
Chart (2006)	Peak position
Austria (Ö3 Austria Top 40)	67
Europe (Eurochart Hot 100)	4
Ireland (IRMA)	1
Scottish Singles Sales (Official Charts)	1
Sweden (Sverigetopplistan)	4
Switzerland (Schweizer Hitparade)	85
Switzerland Airplay (Swiss Hitparade)	57
UK Singles (Official Charts)	1

==== Year-end charts ====
Chart (2006)	Position
Ireland (IRMA)	18
Sweden (Hitlistan)	29
Taiwan (Hito Radio)	12
UK Singles (OCC)	62

=== Certifications ===
Region	Certification	Certified units/sales
United Kingdom (BPI)	Silver	200,000^{‡}
^{‡} Sales+streaming figures based on certification alone.

== In popular culture ==
An adaptation of the song entitled "Hǎo xiǎng nǐ" (好想你, "I Truly Miss You") by Taiwanese singer YoYo (金瑞瑶) was released in 1984.

The song was featured in the ending scene of the 1991 Studio Ghibli film Only Yesterday, directed by Isao Takahata. The ending theme song, sung by Miyako Harumi, is titled "Ai wa Hana, Kimi wa sono Tane" (愛は花、君はその種子, "Love Is a Flower, You Are the Seed"), a Japanese translation of Amanda McBroom's composition "The Rose".

The song appears in Napoleon Dynamite in the scene where Napoleon performs with the Happy Hands Club for his class. The song also appeared in the Richard Simmons exercise video Dance Your Pants Off!. A cover of the song was featured in the 2008 Family Guy episode "Baby Not on Board". During the episode, the Griffin family, except for Stewie, sings the song as a family road trip song. The song was also covered in the episode "Maybe Tomorrow" of True Detective, and in the first episode of the third season of Goliath.

A six-part a cappella arrangement of the song by Nic Raines, created for The King's Singers, was included in the King's Singers 2019 EP release "The Library, Vol. 1" and also in a 2019 music video for YouTube. The song was featured in the 2021 Korean drama series Youth of May, aired on KBS2.
