= Boogie Woogie Bugle Boy =

1941 hit song for The Andrews Sisters

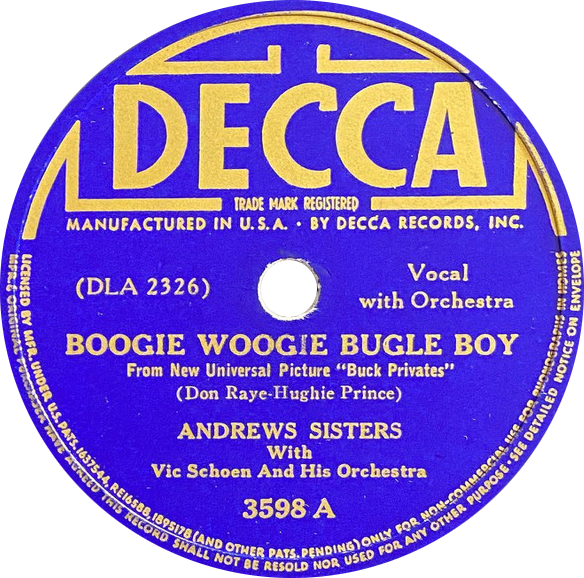
- Side A of the original 1941 US single

Single by The Andrews Sisters
- B-side: "Bounce Me, Brother, with a Solid Four"
- Recorded: January 2, 1941
- Studio: Decca, Hollywood, California
- Genre: Traditional pop; jazz; jump blues
- Songwriters: Don Raye, Hughie Prince

The Andrews Sisters singles chronology
"Scrub Me Mama with a Boogie Beat" (1941)	"Boogie Woogie Bugle Boy" (1941)	"I, Yi, Yi, Yi, Yi (I Like You Very Much)" (1941)

Music video
- "Boogie Woogie Bugle Boy" (Official Music Video) on YouTube

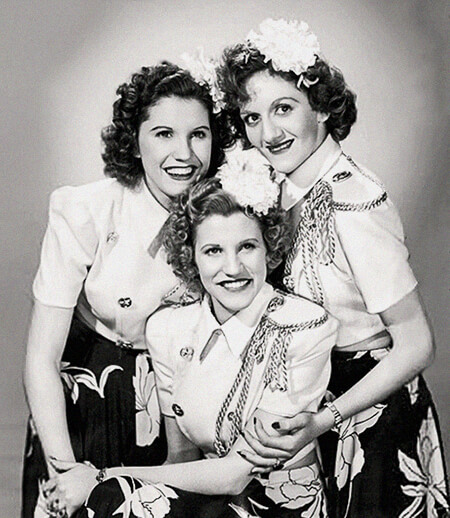
The Andrews Sisters, 1943

"Boogie Woogie Bugle Boy" is a World War II jump blues song written by Don Raye and Hughie Prince which was introduced by The Andrews Sisters in the Abbott and Costello comedy film Buck Privates (1941). The Andrews Sisters' Decca recording reached number six on the U.S. pop singles chart in the spring of 1941 when the film was in release. The song is ranked No. 6 on Songs of the Century. Bette Midler's 1972 recording of the song also reached the top ten on the U.S. Billboard Hot 100.

"Boogie Woogie Bugle Boy" was nominated for the Academy Award for Best Original Song but lost to "The Last Time I Saw Paris".

The song is closely based on an earlier Raye-Prince hit, "Beat Me Daddy, Eight to the Bar," which is about a virtuoso boogie-woogie piano player.

"Boogie Woogie Bugle Boy" has become an iconic song of World War II, commonly featured and referenced in media set during that era. The song inspired the 1941 cartoon Boogie Woogie Bugle Boy of Company B, produced by Walter Lantz Productions, and, long afterward, the Christina Aguilera song "Candyman" (released as a single in 2007) from Aguilera's hit album Back to Basics, as a tribute to both the Andrews Sisters and "Boogie Woogie Bugle Boy". In June 2026, CBS News included the song in its list of the 250 essential American songs of the past 250 years.

== Storyline ==
"Boogie Woogie Bugle Boy" (1941)
Sample of "Boogie Woogie Bugle Boy" by The Andrews Sisters.

According to the lyrics, a renowned trumpet player from Chicago, Illinois is drafted into the U.S. Army but is reduced to blowing the wake-up call ("Reveille"). Restrained from playing boogie-woogie, he is depressed until the captain empathizes and drafts other musicians. The bugler now plays "Reveille" in his own style, with a positive effect on the rest of the company.

== Creation ==
Abbott and Costello's first starring film for Universal pictures, Buck Privates, was designed to capitalize on the Selective Training and Service Act of 1940. The studio added the Andrews Sisters, who were also under contract, for musical relief, and hired Don Raye and Hughie Prince to compose songs for the film. (The sisters also performed songs written by others in the film.) Raye and Prince had previously composed the hits "Rhumboogie" and "Beat Me Daddy, Eight to the Bar" for the trio. The songwriters turned in "You're a Lucky Fellow, Mr. Smith"; "Boogie Woogie Bugle Boy"; and "Bounce Me Brother, With a Solid Four", while also composing a novelty tune, "When Private Brown Becomes a Captain", for Lou Costello.

"Boogie Woogie Bugle Boy" closely follows the template of "Beat Me Daddy, Eight to the Bar", which is about a famous syncopated piano player. However, in its earliest stages, "Boogie Woogie Bugler" (as it was then known) was originally conceived for Lou Costello, but reworked for the Andrews Sisters, while a separate song was composed for the comedian.

== Inspiration ==
Articles published in Stars & Stripes on 19 March 1943, as well as Billboard Magazine and The Christian Science Monitor during WWII claimed that Clarence Zylman of Muskegon, Michigan, was the original Boogie Woogie Bugler. The song's lyrics agree with several aspects of Zylman's life. Drafted at age 35, Clarence had been performing for 20 years, beginning with Chicago radio station WBBM and then with several big bands, beginning with Paul Specht and Connie Connaughton, and most recently with the Tommy Tucker Orchestra. He brought his playing style to England where he was a bugler for an engineer company, playing "Taps" and "Reveille". He eventually was transferred to an army band. Articles in Billboard and The Plain Dealer (Cleveland, Ohio) support this, and go on to claim that Clarence was sent to teach other buglers his techniques. However, Clarence Zylman did not enlist in the Army until June 9, 1942, well after "Boogie Woogie Bugle Boy" was written and recorded. Nonetheless, a sculpture of Zylman as the Boogie Woogie Bugle Boy has been dedicated in his hometown of Muskegon, Michigan, at the LST-393 Veterans Museum. The sculpture was created by artist Ari Norris.

== Bette Midler version ==
"Boogie Woogie Bugle Boy"
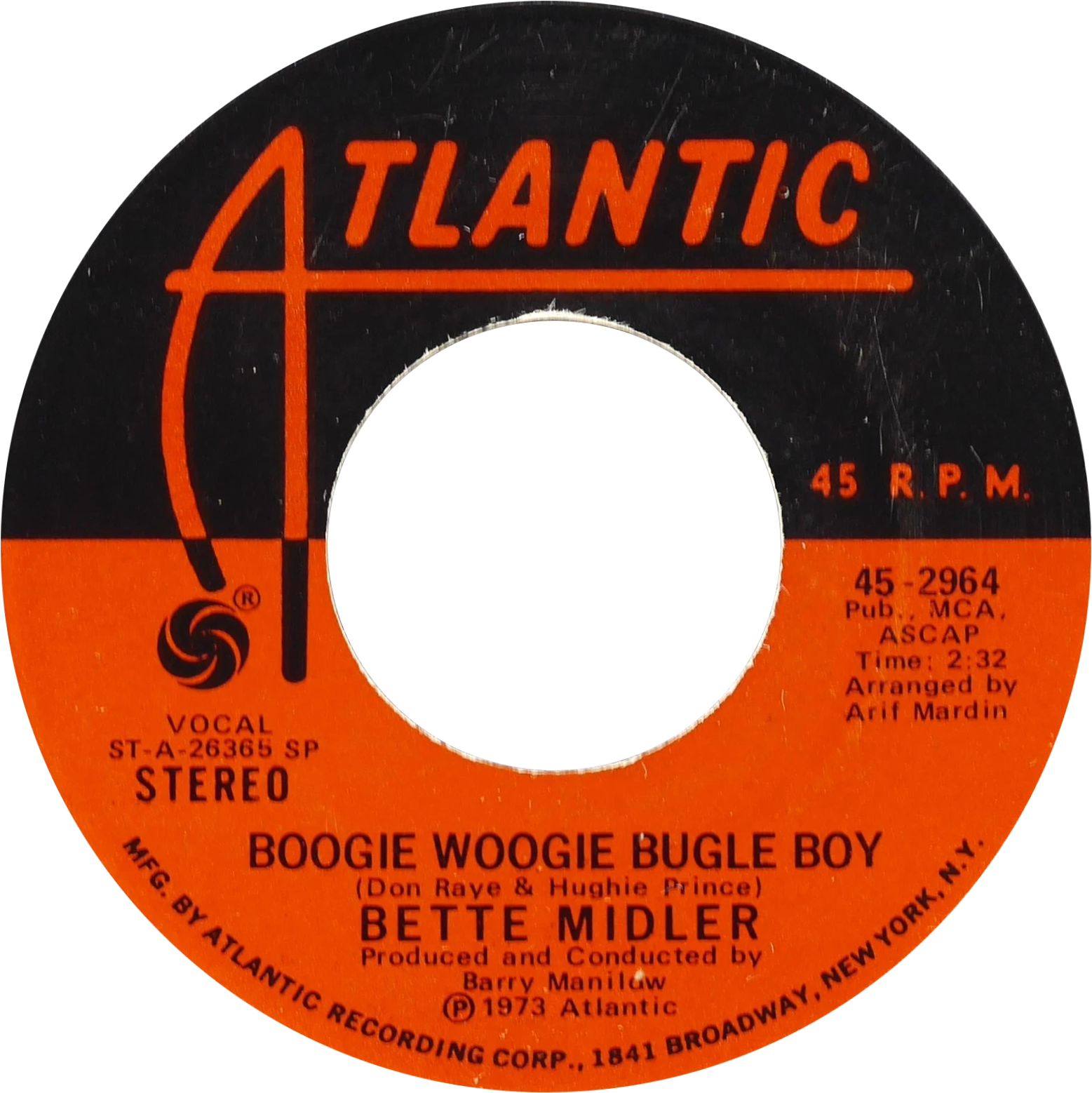
- US single of the Bette Midler recording

Single by Bette Midler

from the album The Divine Miss M
- B-side: "Delta Dawn"
- Released: May 1973
- Studio: Atlantic Recording Studios (New York, NY)
- Genre: Traditional pop
- Length: 2:32
- Label: Atlantic
- Songwriters: Don Raye, Hughie Prince
- Producer: Barry Manilow

Bette Midler singles chronology
"Do You Want to Dance?" (1972)	"Boogie Woogie Bugle Boy" (1973)	"Friends" (1973)

American actress and singer Bette Midler included a remake of the song on her 1972 The Divine Miss M album, and released it as the B side of the album's second single, "Delta Dawn". However, faced with the near-simultaneous release of Helen Reddy's rendition of "Delta Dawn" (which would peak at #1 on both the Billboard Hot 100 and Easy Listening charts) on Long Hard Climb, Midler's singles were quickly flipped, with "Boogie Woogie Bugle Boy" becoming the new A side. Midler's version peaked at number eight on the Billboard Hot 100 singles chart in mid-1973, introducing it to a new generation of pop music fans. The single was produced by Barry Manilow. The track was also a number-one single on the Billboard Easy Listening chart.

=== Chart performance ===
==== Weekly charts ====
Weekly chart performance for "Boogie Woogie Bugle Boy"
Chart (1973)	Peak position
Australia (Kent Music Report)	7
Canada Top Singles (RPM)	8
Canada Adult Contemporary (RPM)	3
New Zealand (NZ Listener)	17
US Billboard Hot 100	8
US Adult Contemporary (Billboard)	1
US Cash Box Top 100	6

==== Year-end charts ====
Year-end chart performance for "Boogie Woogie Bugle Boy"
Chart (1973)	Position
Australia (Kent Music Report)	56
Canada Top Singles (RPM)	94
US Billboard Hot 100	71
US Adult Contemporary (Billboard)	7
US Cash Box Top 100	78

== Other versions ==
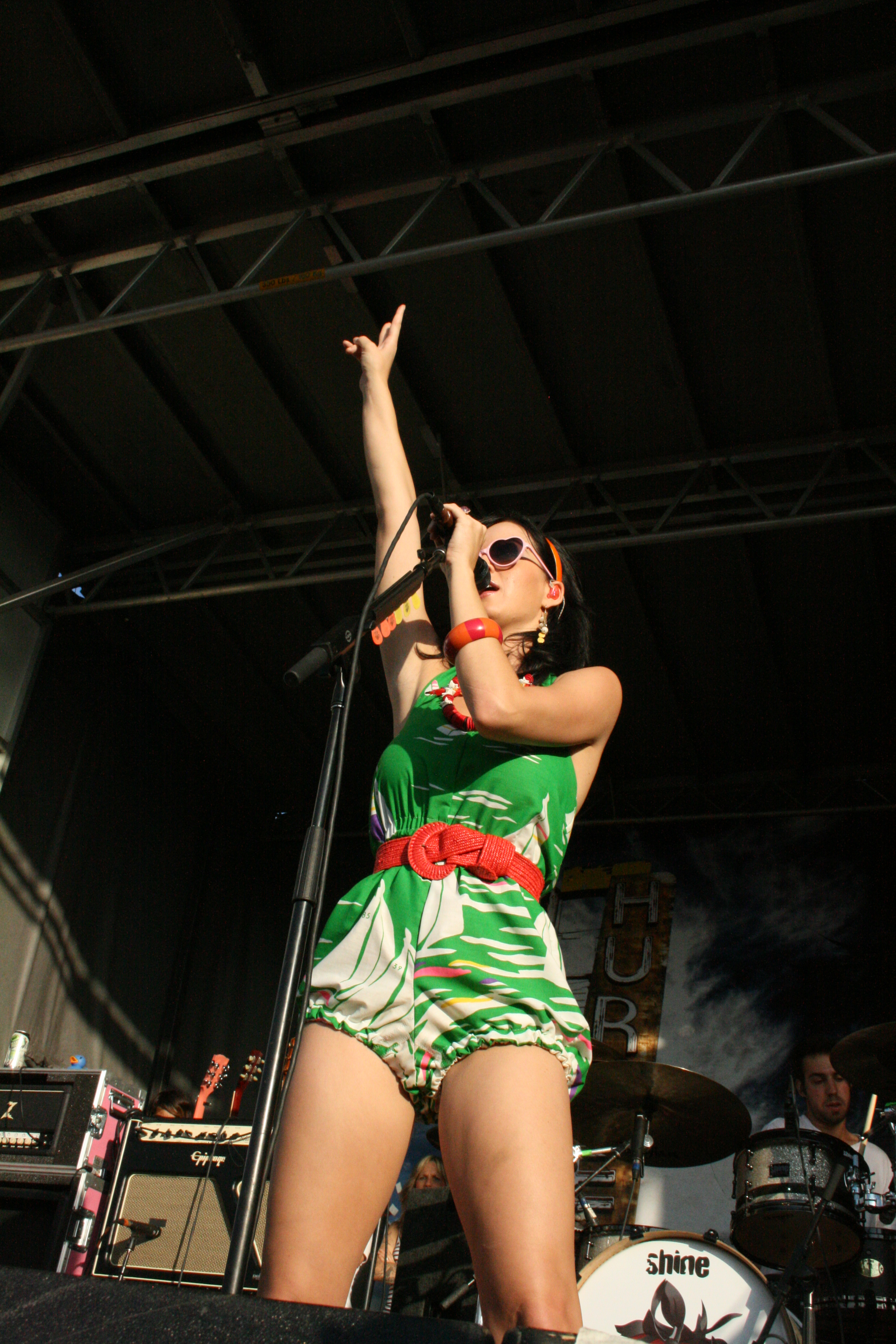
Katy Perry performing the song alongside Keri Hilson and Jennifer Nettles

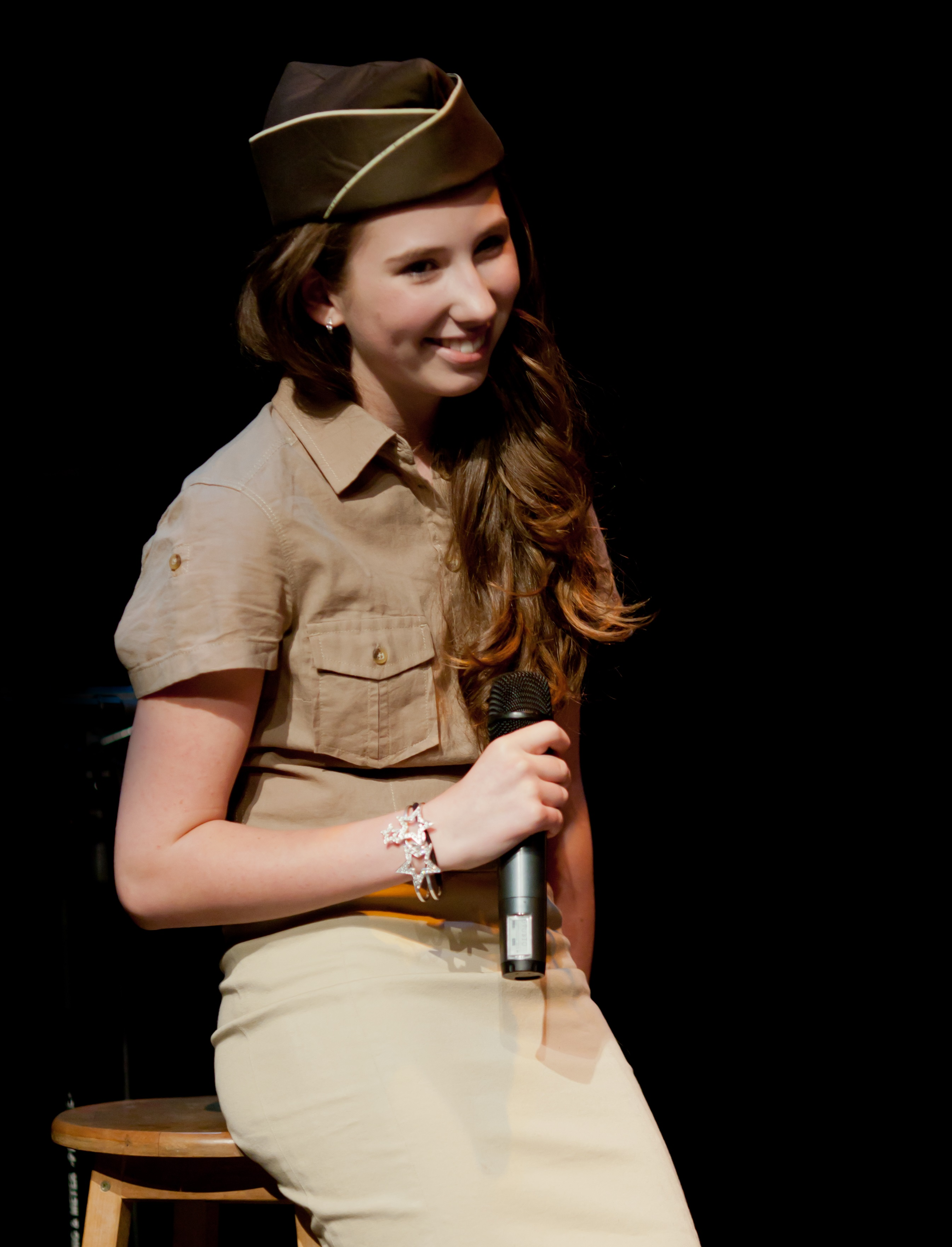
Canadian actress Michelle Creber performing the song

- The Andrews Sisters have recorded at least four different versions on different labels. The Original on Decca Records in 1941, V-Disc in 1944, Capitol Records in 1956, and Dot Records in 1962.
- In 1990, pop/R&B group En Vogue did a shortened version of the song for their album Born to Sing, rewording it to sound more urban, calling him the "Boogie Woogie Hip-hop Boy".
- In 1991, Marie Osmond recorded the song as an inspiration for the military and as part of her USO tour for Operation Desert Shield and Operation Desert Storm.
- In 1995, UK dance act 2 In A Tank produced a dance version called "Boogie Woogie Bugle Boy Don't Stop".
- In 1997, the Kidsongs Kids and the Biggles recorded the song for their Kidsongs video "I Can Do It!".
- In 2003, Brighton downtempo act Backini remixed a version called "Company B Boy" for their album Threads.
- In 2006, the Puppini Sisters recorded the song for their album Betcha Bottom Dollar.
- In 2007, R&B/Gospel group Jerry Lawson and Talk of the Town recorded the song on their album Jerry Lawson Talk of the Town.
- In 2015, Rebecca Ferguson, Pixie Lott and Laura Wright performed the song at VE Day 70: A Party to Remember in London.

== Samples ==
"Boogie Woogie Bugle Boy" is one of the tracks that was sampled for "Moments in Love" by Art of Noise, which appeared on both the 1983 EP Into Battle with the Art of Noise and their debut studio album Who's Afraid of the Art of Noise? (1984).

== See also ==
- List of number-one adult contemporary singles of 1973 (U.S.)
