= Gypsy (original Broadway cast recording) =

1959 cast recording by Ethel Merman et al.

Gypsy – A Musical Fable

Cast recording by Ethel Merman
- Released: 1959
- Genre: Show tunes
- Label: Columbia Masterworks

Professional ratings
Review scores
Source	Rating
Billboard	(positive)
AllMusic	5/5 stars

Professional ratings
50th Anniversary Edition
Review scores
Source	Rating
AllMusic	(no rating)

An original Broadway cast recording of the 1959 musical Gypsy was made in the same year for Columbia. Released on LP, it reached the top 20 on both the mono and the stereo halves of Billboard's Top LPs chart.

== Release ==
The album was originally issued on LP (catalog numbers OL 5420 – mono, OS 2017 – stereo).

A 25th anniversary edition was issued on CD in 2009.

== Reception ==
The album reached number 16 on the mono and number 13 on the stereo half of Billboard's Top LPs chart.

In his retrospective review for AllMusic, William Ruhlmann rated the album five stars out of five.

The album was added to the National Recording Registry that lists sound recordings considered "culturally or historically significant".

== Track listing ==
12-inch LP (Columbia Masterworks OL 5420, OS 2017)

All lyrics are written by Jule Styne; all music is composed by Stephen Sondheim.

Side 1
No.	Title	Vocals	Length
1.	"Overture"
2.	"May We Entertain You"	Jacqueline Mayro, Karen Moore, Ethel Merman
3.	"Some People"	Ethel Merman
4.	"Small World"	Ethel Merman
5.	"Baby June and Her Newsboys"	Jacqueline Mayro, Karen Moore, Newsboys
6.	"Mr. Goldstone, I Love You"	Ethel Merman
7.	"Little Lamb"	Sandra Church
8.	"You'll Never Get Away from Me"	Ethel Merman, Jack Klugman
9.	"Dainty June and Her Farmboys"	Lane Bradbury, Newsboys

Side 2
No.	Title	Vocals	Length
1.	"If Mama Was Married"	Sandra Church, Lane Bradbury
2.	"All I Need Is the Girl"	Paul Wallace
3.	"Everything's Coming Up Roses"	Ethel Merman
4.	"Together"	Ethel Merman, Jack Klugman, Sandra Church
5.	"You Gotta Have a Gimmick"	Faith Dane, Chotzi Foley, Maria Karnilova
6.	"Let Me Entertain You"	Sandra Church
7.	"Rose's Turn"	Ethel Merman

== Charts ==
Chart (1959)	Peak position
US Billboard Top LPs – Best-Selling Monophonic LPs	16
US Billboard Top LPs – Best-Selling Stereophonic LPs	13

== Awards ==
Year	Award type	Categories	Results	Ref.
1960	Grammy Awards	Best Broadway Show Album	Won	
