= Gypsy (1993 film) =

- Promotional poster
- Genre: Biography; Comedy; Drama; Musical
- Based on: Gypsy: A Musical Fable; 1959 stage musical by Arthur Laurents
- Screenplay by: Arthur Laurents
- Directed by: Emile Ardolino
- Starring: Bette Midler; Peter Riegert; Cynthia Gibb
- Music by: Jule Styne (Score); Stephen Sondheim (Lyrics)
- Country of origin: United States
- Original language: English

Production
- Executive producers: Bonnie Bruckheimer; Robert Halmi Sr. Neil Meron; Craig Zadan
- Producers: Emile Ardolino; Cindy Gilmore; Bob Weber
- Production locations: Orpheum Theater; Palace Theater; State Theatre
- Cinematography: Ralf Bode
- Editors: William H. Reynolds; L. James Langlois
- Running time: 153 minutes
- Production companies: Storyline Entertainment; All Girl Productions; RHI Entertainment

Original release
- Network: CBS
- Release: December 12, 1993

Gypsy is a 1993 American made-for-television biographical musical comedy-drama film directed by Emile Ardolino. The teleplay by Arthur Laurents is an adaptation of his book of the 1959 stage musical Gypsy, which was based on the 1957 autobiography Gypsy: A Memoir by Gypsy Rose Lee.

Gypsy Rose Lee's son, Erik Lee Preminger, was instrumental in getting the film in production and was the main source for research. He had tried to get the musical filmed with Bette Midler, who had always wanted to play Rose Hovick, in the principal role 10 years earlier, but it required the approval of five entities to obtain the rights. One of the obstacles had been Arthur Laurents himself, who wrote the book for the musical based on Lee's memoirs. He had hated the 1962 film version and was initially opposed to a remake. "Not for all the money in the world will we let them make another film version of Gypsy," he had said.

The film was originally broadcast by CBS on December 12, 1993, and then released in theaters in foreign markets. It has been released on home video multiple times.

== Plot ==
Determined to make her daughter, June Hovick, a vaudeville headliner, stage mother Rose Hovick will stop at nothing to achieve her goal. She drags June and her older sister, Louise Hovick, around the country in an effort to get them noticed, and with the assistance of agent Herbie Sommers, she manages to secure them bookings on the prestigious Orpheum Circuit.

Years pass, and the girls no longer are young enough to pull off the childlike personae their mother insists they continue to project. June rebels, and elopes with Tulsa, one of the dancers who backs the act. Devastated by what she considers an act of betrayal, Rose pours all her energies into making a success of Louise, despite the young woman's obvious lack of singing and dancing skills. Not helping matters is the increasing popularity of sound films, which leads to a decline in the demand for stage entertainment. With bookings scarce, mother and daughter find themselves in Wichita, Kansas, where Cigar, the owner of a third-rate burlesque house offers Louise a job.

When one of the strippers is arrested for soliciting, Louise unwillingly becomes her replacement. At first, her voice is shaky, and her moves tentative at best, but as audiences respond to her, she begins to gain confidence in herself. She blossoms as an entertainer billed as Gypsy Rose Lee, and eventually reaches a point where she tires of her mother's constant interference in both her life and wildly successful career. Louise confronts Rose and demands she leave her alone. Finally, aware that she has spent her life enslaved by a desperate need to be noticed, an angry, bitter, and bewildered Rose stumbles onto the empty stage of the deserted theater and experiences a moment of truth that leads to an emotional breakdown followed by a reconciliation with Louise.

== Cast ==
- Bette Midler as Rose Hovick
- Cynthia Gibb as Louise Hovick
  - Elisabeth Moss as Young Louise Hovick
- Peter Riegert as Herbie Sommers
- Edward Asner as Pop Charles Thompson
- Christine Ebersole as Tessie Tura
- Michael Jeter as Mr. Goldstone
- Andrea Martin as Miss Cratchitt
- Linda Hart as Miss Mazeppa
- Anna McNeely as Miss Electra
- Jennifer Rae Beck as June Hovick
  - Lacey Chabert as Baby June Hovick
- Jeffrey Broadhurst as Tulsa
- Tony Shalhoub as Uncle Jocko
- Rachel Sweet as Agnes/Amanda
- David Marciano as Patsey
- John LaMotta as Cigar
- Keene Curtis as Mr. Kringelien
- Mike Nussbaum as Weber
- Spencer Liff as Clarence
- Peter Lockyer as Yonkers
- Michael Moore as L.A.
- Patrick Boyd as Kansas
- Terry Lindholm as Flagstaff

== Musical numbers ==
1. "Let Me Entertain You" - Baby June, Baby Louise
2. "Some People" - Rose
3. "Small World" - Rose and Herbie
4. "Baby June and Her Newsboys" - Baby June, Baby Louise, Chorus
5. "Mr. Goldstone" - Rose, Herbie, Chorus
6. "Little Lamb" - Louise
7. "You'll Never Get Away from Me" - Rose, Herbie
8. "Dainty June and Her Farmboys" - June, Louise, Chorus
9. "If Momma Was Married" - June, Louise
10. "All I Need is the Girl" - Tulsa
11. "Everything's Coming Up Roses" - Rose
12. "Together (Wherever We Go)" - Rose, Herbie, Louise
13. "You Gotta Get a Gimmick" - Tessie Tura, Miss Mazeppa, Miss Electra
14. "Small World" (reprise) - Rose
15. "Let Me Entertain You" - Louise
16. "Rose's Turn" - Rose

== Soundtrack ==
The film features a score with music by Jule Styne and lyrics by Stephen Sondheim, and reuses the original orchestrations by Sid Ramin and Robert Ginzler. The musical numbers were choreographed by Jerome Robbins, who directed and choreographed the original Broadway production. Bob Mackie designed the costumes.

== Critical reception ==
Jule Styne said "I'm so excited. I just watched a tape of the movie and I cried. It is the most outstanding singing and acting performance I've seen on the screen within memory."

Dorothy Rabinowitz wrote "Ms. Midler the toughest and brassiest Mama Rose ever... Most everything comes up roses here all right."

Jennifer Stevenson wrote "Probably the best movie of the television year..."

Barbara Jaeger wrote "Midler deserves both an Emmy and a Grammy."

"Midler was sensational as Mama Rose in the recent TV version of Gypsy," wrote The Buffalo News.

The Chicago Sun-Times wrote "Midler has the perfect blend of energy and maturity to portray vaudeville's ultimate stage mother. But the guiding force behind the new, sparkling Gypsy comes from the perceptive and reverent direction of Oscar winner Emile Ardolino, who artfully preserves the spirit of a stage play within the confines of television." In another article, the publication wrote "Bette Midler's star turn in CBS' Gypsy not only brought the TV musical back from the dead, but it also helped the network win another ratings season."

== Nielsen ratings ==
The film received an 18.6/28 household rating/share, ranking 4th out of 90 programs that week, and was watched by 26.2 million viewers.

== Awards and nominations ==
Year	Award	Category	Nominee(s)	Result	Ref.
1994	American Cinema Editors Awards	Best Edited Motion Picture for Commercial Television	William Reynolds	Nominated	
1994	Artios Awards	Best Casting for TV Movie of the Week	David Rubin, Stuart Howard, and Amy Schecter	Nominated	
1994	Directors Guild of America Awards	Outstanding Directorial Achievement in Dramatic Specials	Emile Ardolino	Nominated	
1994	Golden Globe Awards	Best Miniseries or Motion Picture Made for Television		Nominated	
1994	Golden Globe Awards	Best Actress in a Miniseries or Motion Picture Made for Television	Bette Midler	Won	
1994	Golden Globe Awards	Best Supporting Actress in a Series, Miniseries or Motion Picture Made for Television	Cynthia Gibb	Nominated	
1994	Primetime Emmy Awards	Outstanding Made for Television Movie	Robert Halmi, Craig Zadan, Neil Meron, Bonnie Bruckheimer, Emile Ardolino and Cindy Gilmore	Nominated	
1994	Primetime Emmy Awards	Outstanding Lead Actress in a Miniseries or a Special	Bette Midler	Nominated	
1994	Primetime Emmy Awards	Outstanding Individual Achievement in Directing for a Miniseries or a Special	Emile Ardolino	Nominated	
1994	Primetime Emmy Awards	Outstanding Individual Achievement in Art Direction for a Miniseries or a Special	Jackson De Govia, John R. Jensen and K. C. Fox	Nominated	
1994	Primetime Emmy Awards	Outstanding Individual Achievement in Cinematography for a Miniseries or a Special	Ralf D. Bode	Nominated	
1994	Primetime Emmy Awards	Outstanding Individual Achievement in Costume Design for a Miniseries or a Special	Bob Mackie	Nominated	
1994	Primetime Emmy Awards	Outstanding Individual Achievement in Editing for a Miniseries or a Special – Single Camera Production	William Reynolds	Nominated	
1994	Primetime Emmy Awards	Outstanding Individual Achievement in Hairstyling for a Miniseries or a Special	Carol Meikle, Hazel Catmull and Gloria Montemayor	Nominated	
1994	Primetime Emmy Awards	Outstanding Individual Achievement in Makeup for a Miniseries or a Special	Hallie D'Amore, Christy Ann Newquist and Eugenia Weston	Nominated	
1994	Primetime Emmy Awards	Outstanding Individual Achievement in Music Direction	Michael Rafter	Won	
1994	Primetime Emmy Awards	Outstanding Individual Achievement in Sound Editing for a Miniseries or a Special	Greg Schorer, J. Michael Hooser, Bob Costanza, Mike Dickeson, Gary Macheel, Richard S. Steele, Mark Steele, Rick Crampton, David C. Eichhorn, Rusty Tinsley, Stuart Calderon, Gary Shinkle, Scott Grusin, Chris Ledesma, Sally Boldt, Jill Schachne, Tim Chilton, Sharon Michaels, Joseph Malone, Joe Bennett and Tim Terusa	Nominated	
1994	Primetime Emmy Awards	Outstanding Sound Mixing for a Drama Miniseries or a Special	Larry Stensvold, Robert Schaper, Garrie Bolger and David M. Ronne	Nominated	
1994	Television Critics Association Awards	Program of the Year		Nominated	
1994	Television Critics Association Awards	Outstanding Achievement in Specials		Nominated	

== Home video ==
The film was released on videotape and laserdisc by RHI Entertainment in 1994 and on DVD by Pioneer Entertainment in 2000 and Lionsgate Home Entertainment in 2005. In recent years, the film has also been released to several digital download and streaming outlets such as Amazon and iTunes. On March 12, 2013, after several years of unavailability, Mill Creek Entertainment reissued the film on DVD in a double-feature set with the 2001 television remake of South Pacific.

== See also ==
- Gypsy, 1962 film
