= Gypsy (1962 film) =

1962 film by Mervyn LeRoy

- Theatrical release poster
- Directed by: Mervyn LeRoy
- Screenplay by: Leonard Spigelgass
- Based on: Gypsy: A Musical Fable (1959 musical) by Arthur Laurents Gypsy: A Memoir (1957 book) by Gypsy Rose Lee
- Produced by: Mervyn LeRoy
- Starring: Rosalind Russell; Natalie Wood; Karl Malden
- Cinematography: Harry Stradling
- Edited by: Philip W. Anderson
- Music by: Jule Styne; Frank Perkins (music supervision and conducting)
- Distributed by: Warner Bros. Pictures
- Release date: November 1, 1962
- Running time: 143 minutes
- Country: United States
- Language: English
- Budget: $4 million
- Box office: $11.1 million

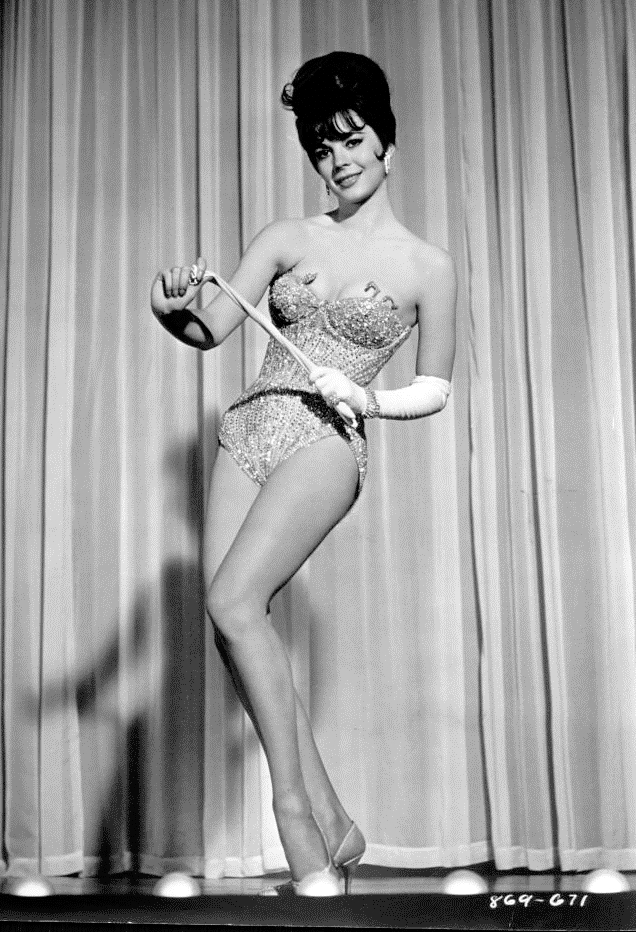
Natalie Wood as Gypsy Rose Lee

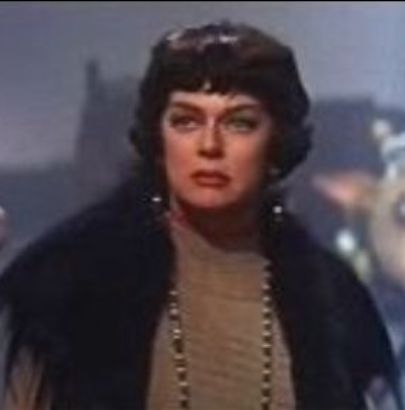
Rosalind Russell as "Madame Rose" Hovick

Gypsy is a 1962 American musical comedy-drama film produced and directed by Mervyn LeRoy. The screenplay by Leonard Spigelgass is based on the 1959 stage musical Gypsy: A Musical Fable by Arthur Laurents, which was adapted from the 1957 autobiography Gypsy: A Memoir by Gypsy Rose Lee. The film stars Rosalind Russell, Natalie Wood, and Karl Malden. Stephen Sondheim wrote the lyrics for songs composed by Jule Styne.

== Plot ==
In the 1920s, determined to make her daughter June a vaudeville headliner, stage mother Rose Hovick will stop at nothing to achieve her goal. She drags "Baby June" and her shy, older sister Louise around the country in an effort to get them noticed, and with the help of agent Herbie Sommers, finally manages to secure a booking on the Orpheum Circuit.

Years pass, and the girls are no longer young enough to pull off the childlike personae their mother insists they continue projecting. Not quite 13-year-old June rebels and elopes with Gerry, one of the male backup dancers for their act (when Rose questions June's age, she is informed that it is legal in that state at the time). When the other dancers discover this, they also leave, presuming the act is finished. Devastated by this perceived betrayal, Rose pours all her energy into making a success of Louise, despite her obvious lack of skill as a performer.

Not helping matters is the increasing popularity of sound films, which leads to a decline in the demand for stage entertainment. Herbie sticks with mother and daughter through their struggles, vainly hoping that Rose will one day quit show business and settle down with him. With bookings scarce, they find themselves in Wichita, Kansas, where a third-rate burlesque house, featuring a lineup of strippers, books their act in hope of keeping the vice squad at bay.

Rose appears to have faced reality about their lack of prospects while at the burlesque house, deciding that this will be their last booking and suggesting that she and Herbie finally marry. However, when a headlining stripper is arrested for shoplifting, Rose is unable to resist offering Louise as her replacement, rationalizing that Louise will end her show business career as a headliner. Louise reluctantly agrees to go through with it, though it is clear she is only doing it to please her mother. This becomes the final straw for Herbie, as he is disgusted at the lengths Rose will go to as a stage mother and realizes that she will never marry him. He offers her one chance to give him a reason to stay, and when she fails, he leaves her for good.

Strippers who have recognized Louise's talent as a seamstress, for whom Louise has sewn costumes, offer Louise advice for success in stripping. They advise that strippers have to have a "gimmick", something that sets their act apart from the others', such as Mazzepa, who dresses up as a gladiator shooting off a canon in her act, or Electra, who uses light bulbs in her costume that flash to enhance her shimmies. Rose instructs Louise to parade around the stage, dip, and just drop a shoulder strap at the end of her act, like a lady. For her performance, Louise repurposes the musical number "Let Me Entertain You", used in their act since the Baby June days, with a decidedly altered delivery. At first, Louise's voice is shaky, and her moves tentative, but she gains confidence as audiences respond to her, enthralled by her restraint and wanting more. Eventually, Louise blossoms as an entertainer billed as Gypsy Rose Lee, featured in magazine photo shoots and popular in society.

Exasperated by her mother's constant interference in both her life and wildly successful career, Louise finally confronts Rose and demands she leave her alone. Understanding that she has spent her life enslaved by a desperate need to be noticed and has driven everyone away, an angry, resentful, and bewildered Rose stumbles onstage at the deserted theatre and experiences an emotional breakdown. Rose bitterly reflects that if she had had the right support in her own youth, she could have been a star herself. Louise witnesses her mother's soliloquy and agrees that her mother would have been a star. Mollified, Rose admits she tried to live vicariously through her and June, and the two women begin to reconcile. Louise invites her mother along to a society party she is attending that evening.

== Cast ==
- Rosalind Russell as Rose Hovick
  - Lisa Kirk as Rose Hovick (singing voice; uncredited)
- Natalie Wood as Louise Hovick/Gypsy Rose Lee
  - Diane Pace as Baby Louise
- Karl Malden as Herbie Sommers
- Paul Wallace as Tulsa
- Betty Bruce as Tessie Tura
- Parley Baer as Mr. Kringelein
- Harry Shannon as Grandpa
- Ann Jillian as Dainty June/June Havoc
  - Morgan Brittany (credited as Suzanne Cupito) as Baby June
- Faith Dane as Mazeppa
- Roxanne Arlen as Electra
- Jean Willes as Betty Cratchitt
- George Petrie as George
- Ben Lessy as Mervyn Goldstone
- Guy Raymond as Pastey
- Louis Quinn as Cigar
- Harvey Korman as Gypsy's press agent (uncredited)
- Jack Benny as himself (uncredited)
- Danny Lockin as Gerry (uncredited)
- Bert Michaels as Yonkers (uncredited)

== Musical numbers ==
1. Overture – Orchestra, conducted by Jule Styne
2. "Small World" – Rose
3. "Some People" – Rose
4. "Baby June and Her Newsboys" – Baby June, Chorus
5. "Mr. Goldstone, I Love You" – Rose and chorus
6. "Little Lamb" – Louise
7. "You'll Never Get Away From Me" – Rose, Herbie
8. "Dainty June and Her Farmboys" – Dainty June, Chorus
9. "If Mama Was Married" – June, Louise
10. "All I Need Is the Girl" – Tulsa
11. "Everything's Coming Up Roses" – Rose
12. "Together Wherever We Go" – Rose, Herbie, Louise
13. "You Gotta Have a Gimmick" – Tessie Tura, Mazeppa, Electra
14. "Small World" (Reprise) – Rose
15. "Let Me Entertain You" – Louise
16. "Rose's Turn" – Rose

"Together Wherever We Go" was deleted before the film's release, but it was included on the soundtrack album, and "You'll Never Get Away from Me" was abbreviated to a solo for Rose following the initial run. In the DVD release of the film, both numbers, taken from a 16-millimeter print of inferior quality, are included as bonus features.

== Production ==
Rosalind Russell and her husband Frederick Brisson were hoping to do a straight dramatic version of the story based directly on the memoir by Gypsy Rose Lee, but the book was tied to the rights to the play. Coincidentally, Russell had starred in the film version of the Leonard Spigelgass play A Majority of One at Warner Bros. Pictures, which Brisson had produced, and all parties came together to make Gypsy, with Russell starring, LeRoy directing, and Spigelgass writing the highly faithful adaptation of Arthur Laurents's stage book.

Although Russell had starred and sung in the 1953 stage musical Wonderful Town and the 1955 film The Girl Rush, the Gypsy score was beyond her. Her own gravelly singing voice was artfully blended with that of contralto Lisa Kirk. Kirk's ability to mimic Russell's voice is showcased in the final number "Rose's Turn". Kirk's full vocal version was released on the original soundtrack, but it is not the version used in the finished film. In later years, Russell's original vocals were rediscovered on scratchy acetate discs and included as bonus tracks on the CD reissue of the film's soundtrack.

Marni Nixon had dubbed Natalie Wood's singing voice in West Side Story the previous year, but Wood did her own singing in Gypsy. While Wood recorded a separate version of "Little Lamb" for the soundtrack album, she sang the song in the film "live" on the set. Other songs performed live were "Mr. Goldstone, I Love You" and the reprise of "Small World", both sung by Russell (not Kirk).

== Reception ==
=== Box office ===
Gypsy was a financial success. Produced on a budget of $4 million, the film grossed $11,076,923 at the box office, earning $6 million in U.S. theatrical rentals. It was the eighth highest-grossing film of 1962 in the United States.

=== Critical response ===
Film historian Douglas McVay observed in his book The Musical Film, "Fine as West Side Story is, though, it is equalled and, arguably, surpassed – in a rather different idiom – by another filmed Broadway hit: Mervyn LeRoy's Gypsy. Arthur Laurents' 'book' [for] West Side Story (adapted for the screen by Ernest Lehman), though largely craftsmanlike, falls short of his libretto for Gypsy (scripted on celluloid by Leonard Spigelgass), based on the memoirs of the transatlantic stripper Gypsy Rose Lee. The dialogue and situations in Gypsy have more wit, bite and emotional range, and the characterisations are more complex."

Variety noted "There is a wonderfully funny sequence involving three nails-hard strippers which comes when Gypsy has been unreeling about an hour. The sequence is thoroughly welcome and almost desperately needed to counteract a certain Jane One-Note implicit in the tale of a stage mother whose egotisms become something of a bore despite the canny skills of director-producer Mervyn LeRoy to contrive it otherwise. Rosalind Russell's performance as the smalltime brood-hen deserves commendation...It is interesting to watch [Natalie Wood]...go through the motions in a burlesque world that is prettied up in soft-focus and a kind of phony innocence. Any resemblance of the art of strip, and its setting, to reality is, in this film, purely fleeting."

On the review aggregator website Rotten Tomatoes, 73% of 15 critics' reviews are positive.

=== Accolades ===
Award	Category	Recipient(s)	Result	Ref.
Academy Awards	Best Cinematography – Color	Harry Stradling	Nominated	
Academy Awards	Best Costume Design – Color	Orry-Kelly	Nominated	
Academy Awards	Best Scoring of Music – Adaptation or Treatment	Frank Perkins	Nominated	
Golden Globes	Best Actor in a Motion Picture – Musical or Comedy	Karl Malden	Nominated	
Golden Globes	Best Actress in a Motion Picture – Musical or Comedy	Rosalind Russell	Won	
Golden Globes	Best Actress in a Motion Picture – Musical or Comedy	Natalie Wood	Nominated	
Golden Globes	Best Director – Motion Picture	Mervyn LeRoy	Nominated	
Golden Globes	Most Promising Newcomer – Male	Paul Wallace	Nominated	
Laurel Awards	Top Musical	Gypsy	Nominated	
Laurel Awards	Top Female Musical Performance	Rosalind Russell	5th Place	
Laurel Awards	Top Female Musical Performance	Natalie Wood	Nominated	
Laurel Awards	Top Male Supporting Performance	Karl Malden	Nominated	
Writers Guild of America Awards	Best Written American Musical	Leonard Spigelgass	Nominated	

== Home media ==
Warner Home Video released the Region 1 DVD on May 2, 2000. The film is in anamorphic widescreen format with an audio track in English and subtitles in English and French.

The Region 2 DVD was released on December 6, 2006. The film is in fullscreen format with audio tracks in French and English and subtitles in French.

Gypsy is one of six films included in the box set The Natalie Wood Collection released on February 3, 2009.

Gypsy was released on Blu-ray through the Warner Archive Collection on November 20, 2012.

== See also ==
- List of American films of 1962
- Gypsy (1993 film)
