= Joy Woods =

American actress and singer (born 1999)

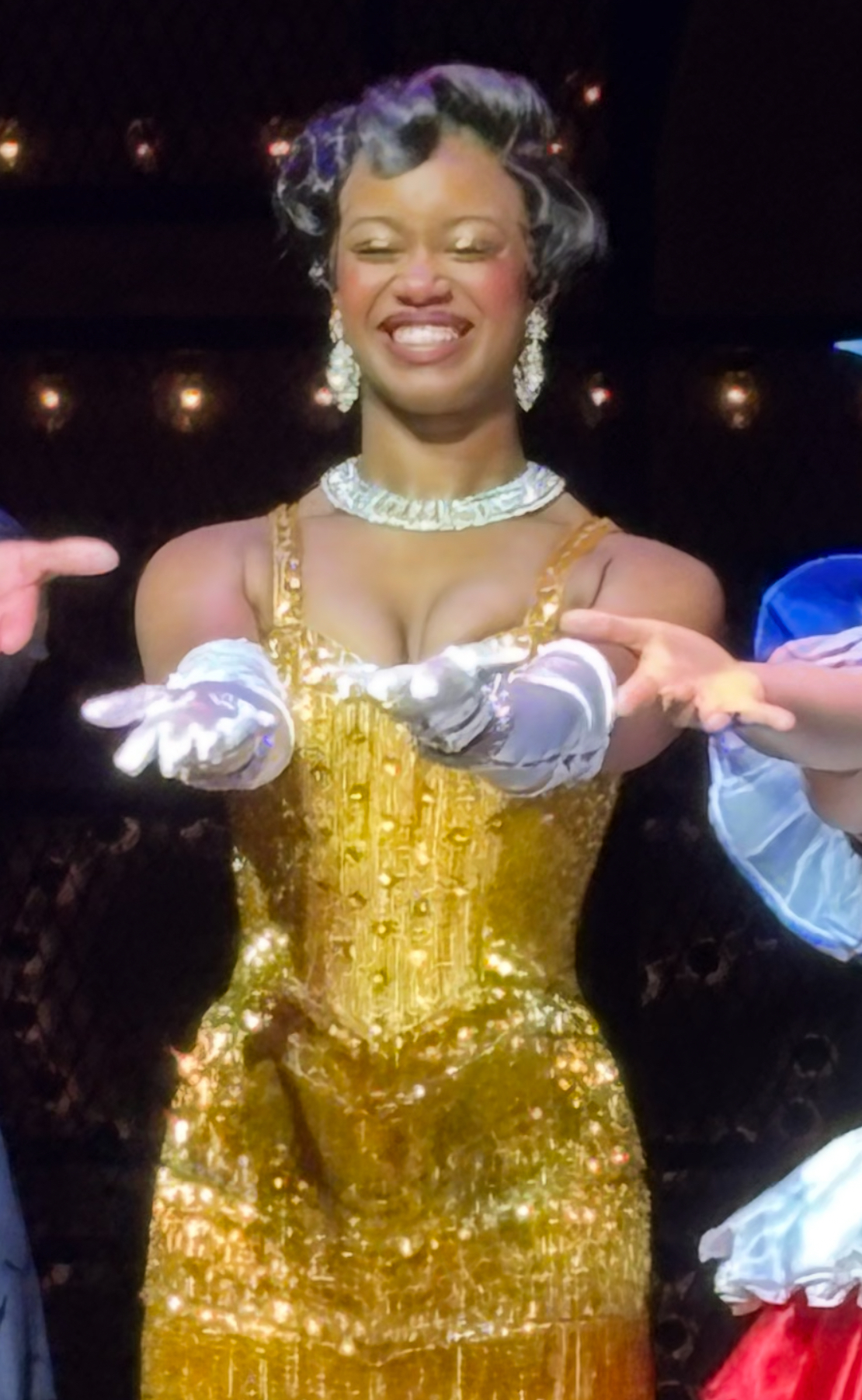
- Woods performing in the Majestic Theatre in 2025
- Born: December 8, 1999 (age 26); Chicago, Illinois
- Education: American Musical and Dramatic Academy
- Occupations: Actress; singer
- Years active: 2019–present

Joy Woods (born December 8, 1999) is an American actress and singer. She is known for her work on Broadway, having starred in Six, The Notebook, and Gypsy, the latter for which she was nominated for a Tony Award and a Grammy Award. She made her West End debut as Sally Bowles in Cabaret.

== Early life and education ==
Woods grew up in Chicago as the youngest of six siblings. Music was a large part of the family; her siblings were musicians and her mother was a dancer. Woods started formal dance training in middle school.

In 2018, Woods graduated from Homewood-Flossmoor High School. She moved to New York City to study at the American Musical and Dramatic Academy, graduating in 2019.

== Career ==
Woods made her off-Broadway debut in the 2019 revival of Little Shop of Horrors as Chiffon and understudy for Audrey and Ronnette. In February 2020, she starred in the ensemble of the New York City Center Encores! concert production of Mack and Mabel.

In 2021, she featured in the virtual Ratatouille: the TikTok Musical.

On March 14, 2022, Woods made her Broadway debut as Catherine Parr in Six.

In September and October 2022, Woods starred as Middle Allie in The Notebook at Chicago Shakespeare Theatre. She then played Deena Jones in North Carolina Theatre's production of Dreamgirls in February 2023.

On May 2, 2023, Woods returned to Little Shop of Horrors, this time in the lead role of Audrey. In doing so, she became the first Black woman to play the role off-Broadway. In late 2023, she starred as Martha Mills in I Can Get It for You Wholesale at Classic Stage Company.

Woods reprised her role in the Broadway transfer of The Notebook, which opened on March 14, 2024. Her performance of the show's 11 o'clock number, "My Days" on Instagram gained over 3 million views. She left the production on October 20, 2024, being replaced by Aisha Jackson.

Woods starred as Louise in the 2024 Broadway revival of Gypsy at the refurbished Majestic Theatre opposite Audra McDonald. Woods is the first black woman to play this role on Broadway. She starred alongside her The Notebook co-star Jordan Tyson. The production opened on December 19. For her performance, she was nominated for a Tony Award for Best Featured Actress in a Musical. It was announced that Woods would star as Sarah opposite Joshua Henry in the New York City Center gala production of Ragtime, but she withdrew to star in Gypsy. The role was instead played by Nichelle Lewis.

In early 2025, she appeared in Trisha Paytas' Big Broadway Dream! at the St. James Theatre. On September 21, 2025, Woods was part of the cast of the 30th anniversary concert of Songs of a New World at the Eventim Apollo in London. Woods joined Shoshana Bean, Titus Burgess and Jordan Fisher, with Jason Robert Brown directing and playing piano and keyboard during the performances.

On April 10 2026 it was announced that Woods would be making her West End debut as Sally Bowles in Cabaret at the Playhouse Theatre, opposite Jamie Muscato as the Emcee.

== Stage credits ==
Year	Show	Role	Theatre	Notes
2019–2020	Little Shop of Horrors	Chiffon, u/s Audrey/Ronnette	Westside Theatre	Off-Broadway
2020	Mack and Mabel	Ensemble	New York City Center	Encores!
2021–2022	Little Shop of Horrors	Chiffon, u/s Audrey/Ronnette	Westside Theatre	Off-Broadway
2022	Six	Catherine Parr	Lena Horne Theatre	Broadway
2022	The Notebook	Middle Allie	Chicago Shakespeare Theatre	Regional
2023	Dreamgirls	Deena Jones	North Carolina Theatre	Regional
2023	Little Shop of Horrors	Audrey	Westside Theatre	Off-Broadway
2023	I Can Get It For You Wholesale	Martha Mills	Classic Stage Company	Off-Broadway
2024	The Notebook	Middle Allie	Gerald Schoenfeld Theatre	Broadway
2024–2025	Gypsy	Louise Hovick	Majestic Theatre	Broadway
2025	Songs for a New World	Woman #1	Hammersmith Apollo	30th Anniversary Concert
2025–2026	Little Shop of Horrors	Audrey	Westside Theatre	Off-Broadway
2026	Cabaret	Sally Bowles	Playhouse Theatre	West End
2026	Galileo	Virginia Galilei	Shubert Theatre	Broadway

== Other productions ==
- We Chose to Go to the Moon (2026)

== Personal life ==
Woods identifies as gay, though she "dabble[s] in men every now and then."

== Awards and nominations ==
Year	Award	Category	Nominated work	Result	Ref.
2025	Broadway.com Audience Choice Awards	Favorite Featured Actress in a Musical	Gypsy	Nominated	
2025	Drama League Awards	Distinguished Performance	Gypsy	Nominated	
2025	Tony Awards	Best Performance by a Featured Actress in a Musical	Gypsy	Nominated	
2026	Grammy Awards	Best Musical Theater Album	Gypsy	Nominated	
