= Dan Burton (disambiguation) =

Dan Burton is an American politician.

Dan Burton may also refer to:

- Daniel Burton (born 1963), American bicyclist
- Dan Burton (actor) (born 1985), British actor
- Dan Burton (musician), a member of the band Ativin
- Danny Burton (coach), former head coach of Inglewood United FC
