= Julio de Diego =

Spanish Artist

- Born: 1900; Madrid, Spain
- Died: August 22, 1979 (aged 78–79); Sarasota, Florida, United States
- Known for: Artist, Jewelry Maker
- Spouse(s): Rosalind Mallery (m. 19??; div. 19??) Gypsy Rose Lee (m. 1948; div. 1955)

Julio de Diego (1900 – August 22, 1979) was a Spanish-born American visual artist. One of his best known paintings is "The Portentous City," a vertical view of Manhattan skyscrapers.

== Biography ==
=== 1900s–30s ===
Julio De Diego was born in Madrid, Spain in 1900. At the age of 15 he left home after his domineering father destroyed "every drawing in the house." Shortly thereafter, his art was exhibited for the first time in a show at a casino, where he sold his first painting. During this period, Diego also worked in a Madrid studio that produced scenery for opera productions. He appeared as an extra in the production by Diaghilev's Ballets Russes of Stravinsky's Petrushka, starring Vaslav Nijinsky. He also served as art director for Spain's first four-reel film, in which he also played the villain. While still in his teens, Diego enlisted in the Spanish cavalry. He served with the Spanish forces for two years, including a six-month stint in the Rif War. Diego reported that he was wounded by an enemy saber during the Riff campaign. After the war, Diego cut off contact with his family and traveled to Paris, where he was exposed to the latest in Cubism, Abstraction, and Surrealism.

In 1924 Diego immigrated to the United States. Shortly after his arrival, he is said to have gone to the observation deck of the Woolworth Building (then New York's tallest), and thrown all of his money off the roof, saying "I wanted to start from scratch." One of his first jobs in the United States was designing scenery in Tampa, Florida for the touring Broadway show "Wild Cat." Diego also found work as a commercial artist, drawing fashion illustrations. In 1926, Diego started to focus more on painting, and began to garner awards. It was also in 1926 that Diego moved to Chicago. Diego first exhibited at the Art Institute of Chicago in 1929. In this same year he started to participate at the various Annual American Exhibitions, Chicago Artists Exhibitions, and International Water Color Exhibitions. He was commissioned to design the chapel doors of St. Gregory's Church in 1926.

=== 1932–79 ===
Diego was briefly married to Rosalind Mallery while in Chicago. After the divorce in 1932 his daughter, Kiriki, went to live with Diego's friend Paul Hoffman. In the summer of 1935 Diego had a solo exhibit at the Art Institute of Chicago. He moved, this time to Mexico, where he collected native artifacts and took inspiration from the muralist Carlos Mérida. Besides collecting he also did some set designs for ballets and designed costumes. In 1946 he held a Modern Handmade Jewelry exhibition at the Museum of Modern Art and two years later, remarried, to Gypsy Rose Lee, becoming her third husband. Together they traveled with the Royal American Shows where Gypsy worked as a performer while her husband created murals. Three years later they divorced in Reno, Nevada, and he settled in California. During World War II he supported the American Artists' Congress which was fighting censorship in Germany and Italy and before it was in opposition against Francisco Franco. After the war he taught at the University of Denver and the Artist Equity Workshop. Later on he settled in Sarasota, Florida where he died on August 22, 1979.

== Illustrator ==
Was the illustrator for an edition of "Have You Seen Birds" by Joanne Oppenheim (ISBN 978-0590405850). In 1964 he illustrated "A Stranger in the Spanish Village" by Anita MacRae Feagles.

== Filmography ==
Year	Title	Role	Notes
1958	The Buccaneer	Miguel	
