= 11 o'clock number =

Theater term for type of musical number

11 o'clock number is a theatre term for a big, show-stopping song that occurs at the climax of a two-act musical, late in the second act. It is so named because in the days when musical performances started at 8:30 p.m., this song would occur around 11. Examples include "Rose's Turn" from Gypsy, "Cabaret" from Cabaret, "Memory" from Cats, and "What I Did for Love" from A Chorus Line.

Among the theatre community there is some debate as to the characteristics of an 11 o'clock number. It often signifies a moment of revelation or change of heart of a lead character, often the protagonist, although there are exceptions to this. The 11 o'clock number is also differentiated from the finale in that it is not the final number in the show, but even this is not considered a requirement by some commenters. Broadway producer Jack Viertel defines an 11 o'clock number as "a final star turn".

== Origins ==
In the 1930s, the average start time of a Broadway production was 8:30, hence the musical revue titled Life Begins at 8:40. In the 1970s, however, an impression of New York City's dangers caused some of the public to shy from staying out late in fear of their safety. As a result, the Shubert Organization pushed all of their show times to 7:30. The producer David Merrick used this to his advantage by pushing his showtimes to 8:00, attracting anyone who didn't get tickets to shows at 7:30. By 1975, everyone else made their showtimes 8:00. This didn't deter Merrick from pushing the showtime for 42nd Street, at the St. James Theatre, to 8:15, to entice anyone who was turned away at the Majestic Theatre, then playing The Phantom of the Opera. Eventually, showtimes would shift earlier to 7:00, which is the current standard.

== Notable examples ==
- "Sit Down, You're Rockin' the Boat" from Guys and Dolls
- "Memory" from Cats
- “No Good Deed” from Wicked
- "Revolting Children" from Matilda The Musical
- "Rose's Turn" from Gypsy
- "Cabaret" from Cabaret
- "What I Did for Love" from A Chorus Line
- "She Used to Be Mine" from Waitress
- "The Ladies Who Lunch" from Company
- "Being Alive" from Company
- "I've Grown Accustomed to Her Face" from My Fair Lady
- “42nd Street” from 42nd Street
- "Brotherhood of Man" from How to Succeed in Business Without Really Trying
- "Gimme Gimme" from Thoroughly Modern Millie
- "Another National Anthem" from Assassins
- "Confrontation" from Jekyll & Hyde
- "The American Dream" from Miss Saigon
- "So Long Dearie" from Hello, Dolly!
- "Goodbye" from Catch Me If You Can
- "I'm Here" from The Color Purple
- “The Boy Falls from the Sky” from Spider-Man: Turn Off the Dark
- “The Power of Love” from Back to the Future: The Musical
- "Always Starting Over" from If/Then.
- "If He Walked Into My Life" from Mame
- "Get out and Stay out" from 9 to 5
- "Words Fail" from Dear Evan Hansen
- "It all Fades away" from The Bridges of Madison County
- "Back to Before" from Ragtime
- "Work the Wound" from Passing Strange
- “Home” from Beetlejuice
- “You Gotta Die Sometime” from Falsettos
