= Bert Michaels =

American actor, choreographer, dancer and singer

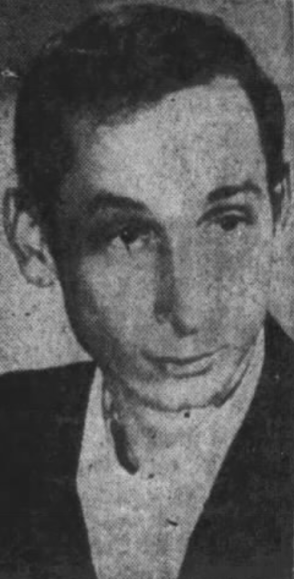
- Michaels in 1963
- Born: December 22, 1943 (age 81)
- Occupation(s): Actor, choreographer, dancer, singer

Bert Michaels (born December 22, 1943) is an American actor, choreographer, dancer and singer. He is perhaps best known for playing Snowboy in the 1961 film West Side Story.

== Partial filmography ==
- West Side Story (1961) - Snowboy
- Incident in an Alley (1962) - Preacher (uncredited)
- Gypsy (1962) - Yonkers (uncredited)
- Mary Poppins (1964) – Chimney Sweep (uncredited)
- Saturday Night Fever (1977) – Pete
- Stardust Memories (1980) - Fan in Lobby
- Enchanted (2007) - Dancer
- College Road Trip (2008) - Male Cha-Cha Dancer
- West Side Story (2021) – Gimbels Security Guard
