= Rose Thompson Hovick =

Mother of Gypsy Rose Lee (1890-1954)

Ellen June, Rose Louise (Gypsy), and mother Rose Hovick 1925 passport photo

Rose Evangeline Hovick (née Thompson; August 31, 1890 – January 28, 1954) was an American talent manager best known as the mother of two famous performing daughters: burlesque artist Gypsy Rose Lee and actress and dancer June Havoc. Her career as her daughters' manager is dramatized in the musical Gypsy.

== Life and career ==
Rose Evangeline Thompson was born in Wahpeton, North Dakota on August 31, 1890, the daughter of Anna (née Egle) and Charles J. Thompson. Her maternal grandparents were German.

Rose Thompson married her first husband, Jack Hovick, when she was a teenager. She gave birth to Rose Louise Hovick on January 8, 1911 in Seattle, Washington and her second daughter, Ellen June Hovick, in Vancouver, British Columbia on November 8, 1912. Some sources indicate she was born Ellen Evangeline Hovick in 1913, but Hovick acknowledged the earlier year not long before she died. She reportedly had numerous birth certificates for both girls that listed them as being either several years older or younger than they actually were. The former were to evade child labor laws and the latter for reduced or free fares. As a result, for many years, they never were sure of their actual ages.

Later in their careers, the two daughters adopted their more famous stage names: Gypsy Rose Lee and June Havoc. Rose's drive to create a performing career for her daughters eventually led to the end of her marriage to Jack Hovick, who disagreed with her intentions for the girls. Rose married her second husband, Judson Brenneman, a traveling salesman on May 26, 1916 at the Unitarian church in Seattle, Washington, with Reverend J.D.A. Powers officiating.

Many years later, Rose ran both a farm in Highland Mills, New York and a boardinghouse, some of whose tenants were lesbians, in a 10-room apartment on the seedy West End Avenue in Manhattan. At some point, a young woman by the name of Genevieve Augustine, who was said to be Mother Rose's lover, allegedly made a pass at the visiting Lee; in a jealous rage, Mother Rose shot the woman dead. This incident was explained publicly as a suicide. After the young woman's mother demanded an investigation, a case was opened, but a jury declined to indict. Mother Rose's biographer strongly refutes the notion that Augustine was Rose's lover and doubts Rose's complicity in her death in light of her previous attempts at suicide.

Karen Abbott's biography of Gypsy Rose Lee refers to two other violent incidents from Thompson Hovick's life. One involved an unidentified "hotel manager" whom Thompson Hovick pushed out a window to his death. She claimed self-defense and was not charged. She also tried to shoot Bobby Reed, the young man who eloped with Baby June in 1928, in a police station after cops found him and brought him to the station house. A police officer had told the two to make their peace. Reed approached with his hand extended, and Thompson Hovick withdrew a concealed gun and aimed it at Reed, but the safety was still on, and no bullets were discharged. A policeman tried to hold her, but she broke free and viciously attacked the hapless Reed, punching and scratching him.

Thompson Hovick reportedly continued demanding money and gifts from her daughters until her death in 1954.

== Gypsy ==
Thompson Hovick became known as the ultimate stage mother by way of the musical Gypsy: A Musical Fable, based on the memoirs of Gypsy Rose Lee. Originally staged in 1959, Gypsy – with music by Jule Styne, lyrics by Stephen Sondheim, and book by Arthur Laurents – has been performed in countless venues on stage and in film. She is portrayed as a domineering stage mother who will do anything to advance the success of her daughters in show business.

While the character as portrayed in Gypsy commonly is referred to as "Mama Rose" (or "Momma Rose"), this is a sobriquet that does not appear in the script, and adamantly was dismissed by its author Arthur Laurents. In the musical Gypsy, the character is called Momma, Rose, or Madam Rose.

The role has been portrayed on stage and screen by a number of notable Broadway and film stars, including Ethel Merman in the original 1959 Broadway production of Gypsy, Angela Lansbury in the original London production and a Broadway revival, and Rosalind Russell in the Warner Bros 1962 film Gypsy. Stage revivals have starred Tyne Daly, Angela Lansbury, Linda Lavin, Bernadette Peters, Patti LuPone, Betty Buckley, Leslie Uggams, Imelda Staunton, and Audra McDonald. LuPone's 2008 revival of Gypsy won her a Tony Award for Best Actress in a Musical, as did Lansbury's 1973 portrayal and Daly's 1990 portrayal. A television movie starring Bette Midler premiered in 1993.

== Death ==
Hovick died of colorectal cancer on January 28, 1954, aged 63, in Nyack, New York. She had suffered a stroke two weeks earlier.
