= Gypsy (musical) =

1959 musical by Jule Styne, Stephen Sondheim, and Arthur Laurents

- A Musical Fable
- Original Broadway Cast Album
- Music: Jule Styne
- Lyrics: Stephen Sondheim
- Book: Arthur Laurents
- Basis: Gypsy: A Memoir by Gypsy Rose Lee
- Productions: 1959 Broadway; 1973 West End; 1974 Broadway revival 1989 Broadway revival 2003 Broadway revival 2008 Broadway revival 2015 West End revival 2024 Broadway revival
- Awards: 1989 Tony Award for Best Revival; 2016 Laurence Olivier Award for Best Revival

Gypsy: A Musical Fable is a musical with music by Jule Styne, lyrics by Stephen Sondheim, and a book by Arthur Laurents. It is loosely based on the 1957 memoirs of striptease artist Gypsy Rose Lee, and focuses on her mother, Rose, whose name has become synonymous with "the ultimate show business mother." It follows the dreams and efforts of Rose to raise two daughters to perform onstage and casts an affectionate eye on the hardships of show business life. The character of Louise is based on Lee, and the character of June is based on Lee's sister, the actress June Havoc.

The musical contains many songs that became popular standards, including "Everything's Coming Up Roses", "Rose's Turn", "Small World", "Together (Wherever We Go)", "You Gotta Get a Gimmick", and "Let Me Entertain You".

It is frequently considered one of the crowning achievements of the mid-twentieth century's conventional musical theatre art form, often called the book musical. Gypsy has been referred to as the greatest American musical by numerous critics and writers, among them Ben Brantley ("what may be the greatest of all American musicals...") and Frank Rich. Rich wrote that "Gypsy is nothing if not Broadway's own brassy, unlikely answer to King Lear." Theater critic Clive Barnes wrote that "Gypsy is one of the best of musicals..." and described Rose as "one of the few truly complex characters in the American musical."

== Background ==
A musical based on the memoirs of Gypsy Rose Lee was a project of producer David Merrick and actress Ethel Merman. Merrick had read a chapter of Lee's memoirs in Harper's Magazine and approached Lee to obtain the rights. Jerome Robbins was interested and wanted Leland Hayward as co-producer; Merman also wanted Hayward to produce her next show. Merrick and Hayward approached Arthur Laurents to write the book. As he relates, Laurents initially was not interested until he saw that the story was one of parents living their children's lives. Composers Irving Berlin and Cole Porter declined the project. Finally, Robbins asked Stephen Sondheim, who agreed to do it. Sondheim had worked with Robbins and Laurents on the musical West Side Story. However, Merman did not want an unknown composer and wanted Jule Styne to write the music. Sondheim initially refused to write only the lyrics but was persuaded by Oscar Hammerstein to accept the job.

== Synopsis ==
=== Act I ===
Baby June and Louise, the two daughters of Rose Hovick, play the vaudeville circuit around the United States in the early 1920s. Rose, the archetype of a stage mother, is aggressive and domineering, pushing her children to perform. While June is an extroverted, talented child star, the older girl, Louise, is shy. Their act has one song, "May We Entertain You", with June always as the centerpiece and Louise in the background. Rose has big dreams for the girls but encounters setbacks when her father refuses to lend her money for those dreams ("Some People"). When Rose meets a former agent, Herbie, she persuades him to become their manager using her seductive and feminine wiles ("Small World"). Through Herbie's efforts, "Baby June and Her Newsboys" becomes a top vaudeville act.

As the girls grow into adolescents, June and her act have a chance to perform for Mr. Goldstone of the Orpheum Circuit ("Mr. Goldstone, I Love You"). Meanwhile, Louise celebrates her birthday alone and wonders how old she is ("Little Lamb"). Rose rejects Herbie's marriage proposal and he considers leaving, but she asserts that he could never get away from her ("You'll Never Get Away From Me"). After an audition for T.T. Grantziger ("Dainty June and Her Farmboys/Broadway"), June is offered a place at a Performing Arts school. However, Rose turns this down, refusing to break up the act. Louise and June fantasize what life would be like if Rose were married and finished with show business ("If Momma Was Married").

A few months later, still on the road from show to show, Tulsa, one of the boys from the act, confides to Louise that he has been working on his own act and Louise fantasizes that she and he could do the act together ("All I Need Is the Girl"). Shortly after this, June is missing, and she explains in a note that she has grown sick of her mother and the endless tour and has eloped with Tulsa, with whom she will do a new act. Rose is hurt, but she optimistically vows that she will make Louise a star, proclaiming that "Everything's Coming Up Roses".

=== Act II ===
Louise is an adult and Rose has created an act based on the Dainty June act for her. Using an all-female cast, Rose and Herbie attempt to book "Madame Rose's Toreadorables" in vaudeville. They remain together ("Together, Wherever We Go").

With no vaudeville venues left, Louise and her second-rate act wind up accidentally booked at a burlesque house in Wichita, Kansas, as a means to deter police raids. Rose is anguished, as she sees what a booking in burlesque means to her dreams of success, but Louise persuades her that two weeks' pay for the new act is better than unemployment. Backstage, Rose proposes marriage to Herbie. He asks her to break up the act and let Louise have a normal life, and she reluctantly accepts, agreeing to marry the day after their show closes. As they are introduced to Louise, three of the strippers on the bill advise her on what it takes to be a successful stripper, a "gimmick," something that "makes your strip special" ("You Gotta Get a Gimmick").

On the last day of the booking, the star stripper in the burlesque show is arrested for solicitation. Desperate, Rose cannot resist the urge to give Louise another nudge toward stardom, and she volunteers Louise to do the striptease as a last-minute replacement. Herbie is disgusted at how low Rose has stooped and he finally walks out on her ("Small World" (Reprise)). Although reluctant, Louise goes on, assured by Rose that she needn't actually strip but simply walk elegantly and tease by dropping a single shoulder strap. Shy and hesitant, she sings a titillating version of the old vaudeville song "May We Entertain You". She removes only her glove, but she speaks directly to her audience, which becomes her "gimmick". Louise becomes secure, always following her mother's advice to "Make 'em beg for more, and then don't give it to them!" With each performance, the song becomes brasher and brassier, and Louise removes more articles of clothing. Ultimately, she becomes a major burlesque star ("Let Me Entertain You").

At Louise's dressing room, Rose argues with her daughter, now known as the sophisticated "Gypsy Rose Lee". Embittered, Rose reveals that the true motivation for all her actions has been to live vicariously through her daughters so she can chase the stardom she wanted for herself, not for her children. She realizes that she has driven away June, Herbie, and now possibly Louise. She displays the talent that could have been under different circumstances, as the name "Rose" flashes in neon lights ("Rose's Turn"). After her admission to Louise, mother and daughter tentatively move toward reconciliation in the end.

- In the 1974 and 2008 Broadway revivals, although the final dialogue scene remains, there is not a happy ending, but rather a bleak, sad one as all hopes of reconciliation for Rose and Louise fall flat when Louise walks away, laughing sarcastically at Rose's new "dream." The audience is then left with a somber Rose, whose dream of her own lit up marquee slowly fades away to her unrealistic dreams.
- In the 2003 revival starring Bernadette Peters, the final dialogue scene remains, but leaves the ending open to more interpretation from the audience. Louise walks through the stage door, with Rose following behind. Rose then turns to face the audience, a look of sadness and longing on her face as she takes one last look at the empty stage. She pauses and slowly closes the door.
- In the 2015 West End revival starring Imelda Staunton, Louise begins to walk out, and Rose catches up after waking up to reality. Louise puts her arm around Rose as they exit together.
- In the 2024 revival starring Audra McDonald, Rose and Louise embrace and exit the stage arm in arm.

== Songs ==
=== Act I ===
- "Overture" – Orchestra
- "May We Entertain You" (Note: Titled "Let Me Entertain You (Rose's Entrance)" in the 2015 West End revival) – Baby June and Baby Louise
- "Some People" – Rose
- "Some People" (Reprise) – Rose
- "Small World" – Rose and Herbie
- "Baby June and Her Newsboys" – Baby June and Newsboys
- "Mr. Goldstone, I Love You" (Note: Titled "Mr. Goldstone" in the 2003 revival, "Have an Eggroll, Mr. Goldstone" in the 2008 revival, and "Mr. Goldstone" again in the 2015 West End revival) – Rose, Herbie, Ensemble
- "Little Lamb" – Louise
- "You'll Never Get Away From Me" – Rose and Herbie
- "Dainty June and Her Farmboys" – June and Farmboys
- "Broadway" – June and Farmboys
- "If Momma Was Married" – June and Louise
- "All I Need Is the Girl" – Tulsa (Note: Per sondheimguide.com, only Tulsa sings this song; per IBDB, both Tulsa and Louise sing the song, due perhaps to the fact that, in several cast recordings, Louise's laughter can be heard at the end of the final dance break.)
- "Everything's Coming Up Roses" – Rose

=== Act II ===
- "Entr'acte" - Orchestra
- "Madame Rose's Toreadorables" – Louise, Rose and the Hollywood Blondes
- "Together, Wherever We Go" (Note: In the 1973 London and 1974 Broadway productions, this number featured an extended dance sequence in the middle of the song, which was not featured in the original score) - Rose, Herbie, and Louise
- "You Gotta Get a Gimmick" – Mazeppa, Electra, and Tessie Tura
- "Small World" (Reprise) – Rose
- "Let Me Entertain You" (Note: Titled "The Strip" in the 2008 revival and on the recording of the 1989 revival.) – Louise
- "Rose's Turn" – Rose
- "Finale" – Orchestra

=== Notes on songs ===
During the pre-Broadway tryout tour, several songs were cut, including a song for Herbie called "Nice She Ain't" (cut because it was given to Jack Klugman one week prior to opening and he could not memorize the keys and staging in time), and a song for Baby June and Baby Louise titled "Mama's Talkin' Soft". The latter song was cut partly because the staging required the little girls to stand on a platform elevated above the stage, which terrified the young actress playing Baby Louise and partly because the show was running too long. "Mama's Talkin' Soft" was later recorded by Petula Clark and released as a single in the UK in 1959. Other cut songs include "Mother's Day", a song for Baby June's act, "Smile, Girls", which involves Rose trying to teach the untalented girls to smile in order to make the act look good, "Who Needs Him?", which Rose sings to herself after Herbie leaves her, and "Three Wishes for Christmas", a burlesque number similar to one that would be performed at Minsky's Burlesque.

== Dramatic analysis ==
In analyzing the character of Rose, Clive Barnes described her as "bossy, demanding, horrific". Rich described Rose as "a monster". Critic Walter Kerr commented that though Rose is a monster, she must be liked and understood. Patti LuPone describes Rose: "She has tunnel vision, she's driven, and she loves her kids.... And she is a survivor. I do not see her as a monster at all—she may do monstrous things, but that does not make a monster." Sondheim has said of the character: "The fact that she's monstrous to her daughters and the world is secondary... She's a very American character, a gallant figure and a life force." Sondheim also noted, "Yet the end of Gypsy is not entirely bleak. Louise comes out a star and forgives her mother. There is hope for her. Rose does confront who she is in 'Rose's Turn.' There is a catharsis. It's not Rodgers and Hammerstein, but you feel maybe the mother and daughter will come to an understanding and maybe triumph over Rose's craziness and Louise's bitterness."

Brantley noted that Rose is a "mythic character". She is "[t]raditionally presented as an armored tank on autopilot, which finally crashes only minutes before the final curtain".

Bernadette Peters' take on the character was different: "Rose was a woman who was traumatized by her own mother leaving her at an early age. I think that longing for acceptance is what fuels all her ambition. In the end, when she confronts herself in 'Rose's Turn', she realizes she has failed her daughter just as her own mother failed her...and that destroys Rose. There is a vulnerability to Rose that makes her human, not just some loud and cartoonish parody of a stage mother."

== Productions ==
=== Original production ===
The original Broadway production opened on May 21, 1959, at The Broadway Theatre, transferred to the Imperial Theatre, and closed on March 25, 1961, after 702 performances and two previews. The show was produced by David Merrick and directed and choreographed by Jerome Robbins. Ethel Merman starred as Rose, with Jack Klugman as Herbie and Sandra Church as Louise. Scenic and Lighting design were by Jo Mielziner and costumes were by Raoul Pène Du Bois. The orchestrations, including an overture, were supplied by Sid Ramin and Robert Ginzler.

Critic Frank Rich has referred to Robbins' work as one of the most influential stagings of a musical in American theatrical history. The original production received eight Tony Award nominations, including Best Musical, but failed to win any. The original Broadway cast recording won the Grammy Award for Best Original Cast Album (Broadway or TV), and "Small World" was nominated for the Grammy for Song of the Year which went to Sondheim & Styne, popularized with a recording by Johnny Mathis.

When the show closed in March 1961, two national touring companies toured the US. The first company starred Merman and opened in March 1961 at the Rochester, New York Auditorium, and closed in December 1961 at the American, St. Louis, Missouri. The second national company starred Mitzi Green as Rose, followed by Mary McCarty. A young Bernadette Peters appeared in the ensemble and understudied Dainty June, a role she would play the following year in summer stock, opposite Betty Hutton's Rose. It opened in September 1961 at the Shubert Theatre, Detroit and closed in January 1962 at the Hanna, Cleveland, Ohio.

=== 1973 London production ===
In 1973, it was announced that Elaine Stritch would be starring in the first West End production of the show. However, when ticket sales proved to be unsuccessful, producers hired the more familiar Angela Lansbury (according to Craig Zadan, "The ...producers were not able to raise the required capital on Stritch's name, and the promise of a new production...became ominously distant"). The West End production opened at the Piccadilly Theatre on May 29, 1973. It was produced by Barry M. Brown and Fritz Holt, in association with Edgar Lansbury (Angela's brother) and directed by the show's author, Arthur Laurents, with choreography reproduced by Robert Tucker. The supporting cast featured Zan Charisse, Barrie Ingham, Debbie Bowen and Bonnie Langford. Lansbury left the London production in December 1973 to tour the show in the US and was succeeded by Dolores Gray. The production closed on March 2, 1974, after 300 performances.

=== 1974 Broadway revival ===
Prior to opening on Broadway, the Lansbury West End production had a 24-week tour of North America, starting in Toronto, and then travelling to many cities, including Los Angeles, Philadelphia, Washington, DC and Boston. The production opened on Broadway at the Winter Garden Theatre on September 23, 1974, for a planned limited engagement, and closed on January 4, 1975, after 120 performances and four previews. It was completely recast for the American tour and Broadway run with the exception of Bonnie Langford as baby June and Zan Charisse as Louise/Gypsy who played it in the West End with Ms. Lansbury. Maureen Moore (later Bernadette Peters' understudy as Rose in the 2003 revival) played the adult June, and Mary Louise Wilson was Tessie Tura. John Sheridan played Tulsa, for which he won the 1974-75 Theatre World Award. Angela Lansbury won the 1975 Tony Award.

=== 1989 Broadway revival ===
A second revival had pre-Broadway engagements starting at the Jackie Gleason Theater of the Performing Arts, Miami Beach, Florida, in May 1989, and Tampa in May, then The Muny, St. Louis, in June 1989, moving to the Los Angeles Music Center and Orange County Performing Arts Center, Costa Mesa, California in July 1989, and then the Kennedy Center in August and September 1989, with several other venues prior to Broadway.

The production opened on Broadway on November 16, 1989, at the St. James Theatre, and then moved to the Marquis Theatre on April 18, 1991, and closed on July 28, 1991, after 476 performances and 23 previews. Laurents returned as director, with Tyne Daly as Rose, Jonathan Hadary as Herbie and Crista Moore as Louise. Linda Lavin (on July 30, 1990) and Jamie Ross replaced Daly and Hadary respectively, with Daly returning to the production at the Marquis Theatre from April 18, 1991 until closing.

This production won the Drama Desk Award for Outstanding Revival and Daly won the Tony Award for Best Actress in a Musical for her performance.

Jule Styne, in a 1989 interview in connection with the California tryout, said: "About six months ago, Bette Midler wanted to buy it (Gypsy) for a movie. We wouldn't sell it. Because they'd only destroy it." USA Today reported that "Both Liza Minnelli and Bernadette Peters say they would love to play it, but they weren't even approached for this production."

=== 2003 Broadway revival ===
A new Broadway revival began previews on March 31, 2003, and opened on May 1, 2003, at the Shubert Theatre. The director was Sam Mendes, with choreography by Jerry Mitchell and costumes and sets by Anthony Ward. Bernadette Peters played the role of Rose. The New York Times described Peters as "a surefire box office draw who nonetheless may surprise some Gypsy aficionados...How will the ladylike Ms. Peters fit into the role of Rose, a part indelibly marked by its brassy, belting originator, Ethel Merman?...'One of the main reasons I wanted to do the piece was to cast someone as Rose that was closer to Rose as she really existed,' Mr. Mendes said. 'She was a tiny woman. And she was a charmer. And so is Bernadette.'" Laurents had talked to Mendes ("Roughly five years ago" according to The New York Times in 2003) about directing the revival, and Mendes said "he was surprised by the idea of casting Ms. Peters as Rose". Laurents notes of his suggestions on this production are in his 2009 book Mainly on Directing 'Gypsy', 'West Side Story' and Other Musicals. In a 2004 interview Laurents said that Peters' portrayal of Rose was "brilliant, original, totally unlike any of the others" while criticizing Mendes for the "physical production" which Laurents said "was misconceived and hurt the show more than people realized." Gypsy had begun previews with a virtually bare stage, but by opening night this had been changed to a minimalist set. The cast featured John Dossett as Herbie, Tammy Blanchard as Louise, Kate Reinders as June and David Burtka as Tulsa. The production was nominated for four Tony Awards, including Best Revival of a Musical and Best Actress in a Musical; it won none.

In his review, Ben Brantley in The New York Times wrote that "the surprise coup of many a Broadway season...Working against type and expectation under the direction of Sam Mendes, Ms. Peters has created the most complex and compelling portrait of her long career...There have been many illustrious successors to Merman as Rose...Only Ms. Peters, however, can be said to have broken the Merman mold completely."

Gypsy twice set new box office records for the Shubert Theatre. Its gross of $853,476 for the week of June 9–14, 2003 was the highest ever gross for a non-holiday week and the subsequent June 15–21, 2003 box office gross of $874,397 represented the highest gross for a show in Shubert history. However, The New York Times announced that Gypsy would close on February 28, 2004, stating: "Gypsy sold well for most of 2003. But by early January [2004], with tourists gone and local theatergoers staying inside during a brutal stretch of weather, the production's sales grew increasingly weak. More important, the show's advance sale, the main indicator of a production's staying power, began to shrink rapidly. It stood at less than $2 million yesterday." After an increase in the gross, the show's closing was postponed indefinitely, but Gypsy finally closed on May 30, 2004, after 451 performances and 33 previews. The production is believed to have recouped a little more than half of its $8 million investment.

=== 2008 Broadway revival ===
Patti LuPone first portrayed Rose in Gypsy at the Chicago Ravinia Festival in August 2006, directed by Lonny Price and accompanied by the Chicago Symphony Orchestra. It began as a concert production but evolved into a full-fledged production featuring Jerome Robbins' original choreography (recreated by Bonnie Walker) and even a live lamb. Excitement was generated around LuPone playing the role of Rose and producers were eager to see Price's production, with the hope of moving it to New York. Jack Viertel, the artistic director of New York City Center Encores! saw the production and was so impressed that he contacted Arthur Laurents, requesting that he direct a new production of the show for a new summer "Encores!" program. From July 9 to 29, 2007, the show was presented at New York City Center with LuPone once again. Directed by Arthur Laurents, the production also featured Laura Benanti as Louise, Boyd Gaines as Herbie and Leigh Ann Larkin as June. Nancy Opel, Marilyn Caskey, and Alison Fraser played the strippers Mazeppa, Electra, and Tessie Tura (Lenora Nemetz assumed the role of Mazeppa / Miss Cratchitt for the Broadway transfer.)

LuPone recounted in her memoirs that, when Laurents began directing this production, he based his direction initially on the 1989 revival, "because, I think that in Arthur's mind, the Tyne Daly Gypsy had been the last successful production." However, the cast "questioned Arthur relentlessly about...the scenes", and he "tossed the old prompt book out and freed" the actors to explore.

The Encores! production was a success, and despite Ben Brantley's somewhat negative review of LuPone's performance in The New York Times, the show transferred to Broadway, where it opened at the St. James Theatre on March 27, 2008. Brantley gave the production a rave review, praising LuPone, Laurents and the rest of the cast, and describing the characterizations in the production:

"You see, everyone's starved for attention in Gypsy. That craving, after all, is the motor that keeps showbiz puttering along. And Mr. Laurents makes sure that we sense that hunger in everyone.... I was so caught up in the emotional wrestling matches between the characters (and within themselves), that I didn't really think about the songs as songs.... There is no separation at all between song and character, which is what happens in those uncommon moments when musicals reach upward to achieve their ideal reasons to be."

This production won numerous awards including the Tony Awards and Drama Desk Awards for LuPone, Gaines and Benanti. The show was originally scheduled to close in March 2009 on LuPone's final performance, but closed on January 11, 2009, due to decreases in ticket sales. Like the 2003 production, this revival also closed at a loss. The production played for 332 performances and 27 previews. On the eve before the final performance, LuPone made news when she stopped the show during the song "Rose's Turn" to scold a patron for taking illegal photographs during the performance.

Patti LuPone performed in Gypsy before Broadway, stating she starred as Louise in a high-school production of the show when she was 13 years old. LuPone had voiced interest in heading the 2003 Broadway revival, but Arthur Laurents reportedly banned her from any future work with his involvement because she previously walked out on a production of Jolson Sings Again, written by Laurents, in 1995. LuPone and Laurents subsequently reconciled.

=== 2015 West End revival ===
Following a run at the Chichester Festival Theatre, which won the Critics' Choice Theatre Award for Best Musical in 2014, a West End revival of Gypsy opened at the Savoy Theatre on April 15, 2015, in a limited run through November 28. Directed by Jonathan Kent with choreography by Stephen Mear and set and costume design by Anthony Ward, the production starred Imelda Staunton as Rose, Peter Davison as Herbie, Lara Pulver as Louise, Gemma Sutton as June, Dan Burton as Tulsa, Anita Louise Combe as Tessie Tura, Louise Gold as Mazeppa and Julie Legrand as Electra and Ms. Cratchitt. The London production was nominated for eight Laurence Olivier Awards at the 2016 ceremony, winning four, including Best Actress in a Musical (Staunton) and Best Musical Revival, the most awards won by a single production in that year. It also won Best Musical Production and Best Performance in a Musical (for Staunton) at the UK Theatre Awards in 2015. Staunton also won Best Musical Performance at the Evening Standard Theatre Awards in 2015. The production was also filmed and broadcast on BBC Four over the 2015 Christmas/New Year period and was first broadcast on PBS' Great Performances in the United States in 2016.

=== 2024 Broadway revival ===
On May 29, 2024, it was announced that Audra McDonald would play Rose for a new planned revival. George C. Wolfe directed with Camille A. Brown choreographing. Joining McDonald were Danny Burstein as Herbie, Joy Woods as Louise, Jordan Tyson as June, Kevin Csolak as Tulsa, Lesli Margherita as Tessie Tura, Lili Thomas as Mazeppa and Mylinda Hull as Electra. Previews began November 21, 2024 at the Majestic Theatre, opening to near universal raves on December 19, earning a NYT critic's pick. The production was nominated for five Tony Awards, including Best Revival of a Musical. Montego Glover temporarily starred as Rose during McDonald’s vacation from June 30 to July 6. She subsequently served as McDonald's alternate for Sunday matinees. The revival of Gypsy closed on August 17, 2025, after 28 preview performances and 269 regular performances.

=== Other productions ===
Other notable productions of Gypsy include:

==== 1977 Mexico ====
Marga Lopez as Rose and Claudia Islas as Louise. Enrique Gómez Vadillo, director. Also with Raúl Ramírez and Eduardo Alcaraz.

==== 1992 Argentina ====
The production opened at the Teatro Astral in Buenos Aires, directed by Víctor García Peralta. Mabel Manzotti starred as Rose, with Sandra Guida as Louise, Eleonora Wexler as June, and Ambar La Fox as Tessie Tura.

==== 1998 Mexico ====
A Mexican revival opened at the Teatro Silvia Pinal in Mexico City, produced and directed by Silvia Pinal (legendary Luis Buñuel's Viridiana muse). Pinal and her daughter, the rock singer Alejandra Guzmán starred. Guzmán was replaced by Irán Castillo.

==== 1998 Paper Mill Playhouse ====
Betty Buckley, Deborah Gibson and Lenny Wolpe starred at the Paper Mill Playhouse in Millburn, New Jersey. Laura Bell Bundy played June. It was rumored to be Broadway bound, but this did not materialize.

==== 2001 Estonian production ====
The production opened at the Theatre Vanemuine in Tartu, directed by Mare Tommingas. The cast included Silvi Vrait as Rose and the production would enjoy a successful run of performances from 2001 through 2003.

==== 2005 Shaw Festival ====
This production ran in rep at the Shaw Festival, Niagara-on-the-Lake, Ontario starring Nora McLellan as Rose and Julie Martell as Louise. Martell understudied Tammy Blanchard in the 2003 Broadway revival. Also, Kate Hennig, who has appeared on Broadway as Ms. Wilkinson in Billy Elliot, played Ms. Cratchitt as well as understudying and playing Rose at certain scheduled performances.

==== 2007 North American tour ====
Gypsy was presented by Phoenix Entertainment with Kathy Halenda starring as Rose and Missy Dowse as Louise. The production was directed by Sam Viverto and assisted by Aja Kane. Principal casting also included Ruby Lewis as June, Rachel Abrams as Mazeppa, Claire Norden as Baby June, Loriann Freda as Tessie Tura, Nick Hamel as Herbie, and Maria Egler as Electra. The tour ended in May 2008.

==== 2010 Brazil ====
The first Brazilian production opened at Teatro Villa-Lobos, Rio de Janeiro, starring Totia Meireles as Rose, Renata Ricci as June, and Eduardo Falcão as Herbie. Later the production was transferred to Teatro Alfa, São Paulo.

==== 2010 Czech Republic ====
The very first production of the musical Gypsy in Joseph Kajetan Tyl's Theatre in Pilsen was short-lived, no more than 18 performances.

==== 2011 Lyric Stage ====
From September 9 to 18, Lyric Stage in Irving, Texas produced the musical. The production featured a 39 piece orchestra and full original orchestrations that had not been heard since 1961 when the original production closed. It also featured an acoustic guitar part, which had been removed prior to the Boston tryout due to pit size. The production, directed by Len Pluger and Music Directed by Jay Dias, starred Sue Mathys as Rose, Ashton Smalling as Dainty June (she has previously been Baby June at Ravinia in 2006) and Caitlin Carter as Tessie Tura, with local performers Mary McElree as Louise and Sonny Franks as Herbie.

==== 2011 Bristol Riverside Theatre ====
Tovah Feldshuh starred as Rose at the Bristol (PA) Riverside Theatre (BRT) production of Gypsy which opened on December 8, 2011, following two nights of previews. The production, directed by BRT artistic director Keith Baker, ran until January 15, 2012.

==== 2012 Leicester Curve Theatre ====
Gypsy opened in Leicester, UK for a six-week run in March 2012. Directed by Paul Kerryson and starring Australian musical theatre actor Caroline O'Connor as Rose. Among the cast were Victoria Hamilton-Barritt as Louise, David Fleeshman as Herbie, and Daisy Maywood as Dainty June.

==== 2014 Connecticut Repertory Theatre (CRT), Storrs, Connecticut ====
In July 2014, Leslie Uggams starred as Rose, directed by Vincent Cardinal (CRT, Artistic Director), with musical direction by David Williams. The production also featured Michael James Leslie as Pop, Scott Ripley as Herbie, Alanna Saunders as June, and Amandina Altomare as Louise. Uggams' appearance marks the first African-American woman to portray Rose in an Equity Production.

==== 2014 Chichester Festival Theatre, UK ====
In October 2014, Imelda Staunton starred as Rose in a production directed by Jonathan Kent. Lara Pulver performed as Louise, Kevin Whately as Herbie, Louise Gold as Mazeppa, Anita Louise Combe as Tessie Tura and Julie Legrand as Electra. The musical ran to 8 November.

==== 2017 The Cape Playhouse ====
In July and August 2017, The Cape Playhouse presented a celebrated revival of Gypsy that featured Julia Murney as Rose. The production, directed by Michael Rader, choreographed by Jason Sparks and with music direction by Garrett Taylor, broke box office records and featured Caroline Bowman as Louise, James Lloyd Reynolds as Herbie, Tess Soltau as June, Garett Hawe as Tulsa, Jennifer Cody as Tessie and Ms. Cratchit and Wally Dunn as Pop/Goldstone/Webber.

==== 2018 The Muny ====
In July 2018, The Muny in St. Louis produced Gypsy as a part of their historic centennial season. Tony Award winner Beth Leavel starred as Rose, alongside Adam Heller as Herbie, Julia Knitel as Louise, Hayley Podschun as June, Drew Redington as Tulsa, Jennifer Cody as Tessie and Ms. Cratchit, Ellen Harvey as Mazeppa, and Ann Harada as Electra. The production was directed by Rob Ruggiero.

==== 2018 Porchlight Music Theatre ====
In October 2018, E. Faye Butler starred as Rose in a production directed by Michael Weber at Porchlight Music Theatre in Chicago. Daryn Whitney Harrell performed as Louise, Antonio "Tony" Garcia as Herbie, Aalon Smith as June, Dawn Bless as Mazeppa, Melissa Young as Tessie and Honey West as Electra. The production closed December 29, 2018

==== 2019 Manchester Royal Exchange Theatre ====
In November 2019, Jo Davies directed a production starring Ria Jones as Rose, Dale Rapley as Herbie, and Melissa Lowe as June. The production closed February 1, 2020.

==== 2022 Alexandra Palace Theatre, London ====
An "in concert" version of Gypsy was held on February 21, 2022, at the Alexandra Palace featuring seven different actresses in the role of Rose. Tracie Bennett, Nicola Hughes, Keala Settle, Rebecca Lock, Samantha Spiro, Melanie La Barrie and Sally Ann Triplett each played Rose during different sections of the show, alongside Laura Pitt-Pulford as Louise, Carly Mercedes Dyer as June, Christopher Howell as Herbie, Ebony Molina as Electra, Rachel Stanley as Mazzepa and Alexis Owen-Hobbs as Tessie.

==== 2022 Buxton Opera House ====
In July 2022 Buxton Festival staged a production directed by Paul Kerryson, and featuring Joanna Riding as Rose, David Leonard as Herbie, Monique Young as Louise, Hannah Everest as June, and Liam Dean as Tulsa.

==== 2023 Shaw Festival ====
This production opened for a rep run from May 10 through October 7 at the Shaw Festival, Niagara-on-the-Lake, Ontario starring Kate Hennig as Rose. It had originally been slated for the 2020 season but was postponed when the Covid-19 pandemic shut the theatre company down.

==== 2024 Spain ====
A Spanish-language production directed by Antonio Banderas ran from October 17, 2024 to January 12, 2025 at the Teatro del Soho in Málaga, starring Marta Ribera as Rose.

== Film and TV versions ==
Warner Bros. produced the 1962 film adaptation of the musical, starring Rosalind Russell as Rose, Karl Malden as Herbie, and Natalie Wood as Louise. Russell won the Golden Globe for Best Actress for her portrayal of Rose.

Gypsy was also adapted as a 1993 television movie with Bette Midler playing Rose and Peter Riegert as Herbie. Cynthia Gibb portrayed Louise and Jennifer Beck portrayed Dainty June, while the younger versions of Louise and Dainty June were played by Elisabeth Moss and Lacey Chabert, respectively. Bette Midler won the Golden Globe for Best Actress in a television film; Michael Rafter won the Emmy Award for Outstanding Individual Achievement in Music Direction. This production was a rare example of a film or TV project in which some of the songs are sung live, and not lip synced to a prerecorded track.

The 2015 West End revival of Gypsy starring Imelda Staunton was recorded live during its run at the Savoy Theatre, and broadcast on BBC Four on 27 December 2015, with a DVD release in November 2016.

=== Unproduced remake ===
Long interested in leading a screen remake of Gypsy, Barbra Streisand was actively pursuing the project in January 2011, having met with both Sondheim and Laurents. Arthur Laurents shared in a New York Post interview: "We've talked about it a lot, and she knows what she's doing. She has my approval." Conflicting reports of the film's status circulated for a year. Universal Pictures joined the project in March 2012, with Streisand attached alongside Joel Silver co-producing, and Julian Fellowes scripting. Once Universal withdrew from the project in October 2015, Streisand and Silver could shop Gypsy to other studios. Reports in April 2016 placed Streisand in advanced negotiations to star and produce the film, directed by Barry Levinson, and distributed by STX Entertainment. While Richard LaGravenese had completed the new script by July 2016, production halted the following month when STX Entertainment withdrew from the project.

Discussions in February 2019 for a new incarnation of the remake linked Amy Sherman-Palladino to write and direct, with Silver producing, and distribution by New Regency.

== Stage casts ==
| Characters | Broadway | West End | Broadway Revival | Broadway Revival | Broadway Revival | Broadway Revival | West End Revival | Broadway Revival |
| Characters | 1959 | 1973 | 1974 | 1989 | 2003 | 2008 | 2015 | 2024 |
|---|---|---|---|---|---|---|---|---|
| Rose | Ethel Merman | Angela Lansbury | Angela Lansbury | Tyne Daly | Bernadette Peters | Patti LuPone | Imelda Staunton | Audra McDonald |
| Louise | Sandra Church | Zan Charisse | Zan Charisse | Crista Moore | Tammy Blanchard | Laura Benanti | Lara Pulver | Joy Woods |
| Herbie | Jack Klugman | Barrie Ingham | Rex Robbins | Jonathan Hadary | John Dossett | Boyd Gaines | Peter Davison | Danny Burstein |
| June | Lane Bradbury | Debbie Bowen | Maureen Moore | Tracy Venner | Kate Reinders | Leigh Ann Larkin | Gemma Sutton | Jordan Tyson |
| Tulsa | Paul Wallace | Andrew Norman | John Sheridan | Robert Lambert | David Burtka | Tony Yazbeck | Dan Burton | Kevin Csolak |
| Tessie Tura | Maria Karnilova | Valerie Walsh | Mary Louise Wilson | Barbara Erwin | Heather Lee | Alison Fraser | Anita Louise Combe | Lesli Margherita |
| Mazeppa | Faith Dane | Kelly Wilson | Gloria Rossi | Jana Robbins | Kate Buddeke | Lenora Nemetz | Louise Gold | Lili Thomas |
| Electra | Chotzi Foley | Judy Cannon | Sally Cooke | Anna McNeely | Julie Halston | Marilyn Caskey | Julie Legrand | Mylinda Hull |

== Recordings ==
There are recordings of each of the Broadway and London productions, as well as the film and television productions. The original 1959 and revival 2003 cast albums each won the Grammy Award for Best Original Cast Show Album.

The original Broadway cast album was Ethel Merman's first recording in the then-new stereophonic sound technology. Motion pictures recorded in stereo had been steadily made since 1953, and stereo was first used on magnetic tape in 1954, but it was not until 1958, a year before Gypsy opened, that it became possible to use this technology on records.

The 1974 Broadway recording was not an actual recording of the Broadway revival, but a remix of the London Cast recording of 1973 with a new recording of "Some People".

The 1989 Broadway cast recording featuring Daly was released in 1990.

The 2003 Broadway cast recording featuring Peters was released August 19, 2003.

The 2008 Broadway cast recording featuring LuPone was released August 28, 2008.

The 2015 West End cast recording was recorded at Angel Recording Studios in London on 9 March 2015 and was released on 27 April 2015.

The 2024 Broadway cast recording featuring McDonald was released digitally April 25, 2025, with a physical release set for July 25, 2025.

== Other performances ==
The 2001 Royal Variety Performance featured Cilla Black, Paul O'Grady (in his Lily Savage persona), and Barbara Windsor singing "You Gotta Get a Gimmick".

== Awards and honors ==
=== Original Broadway production ===
| Year | Award Ceremony | Category | Nominee | Result |
|---|---|---|---|---|
| 1960 | Tony Award | Best Musical | | Nominated |
| 1960 | Tony Award | Best Performance by a Leading Actress in a Musical | Ethel Merman | Nominated |
| 1960 | Tony Award | Best Performance by a Featured Actor in a Musical | Jack Klugman | Nominated |
| 1960 | Tony Award | Best Performance by a Featured Actress in a Musical | Sandra Church | Nominated |
| 1960 | Tony Award | Best Direction of a Musical | Jerome Robbins | Nominated |
| 1960 | Tony Award | Best Conductor and Musical Director | Milton Rosenstock | Nominated |
| 1960 | Tony Award | Best Scenic Design | Jo Mielziner | Nominated |
| 1960 | Tony Award | Best Costume Design | Raoul Pène Du Bois | Nominated |
| 1960 | Grammy Award | Best Musical Theater Album | Ethel Merman | Won |

=== 1974 Broadway revival ===
| Year | Award Ceremony | Category | Nominee | Result |
|---|---|---|---|---|
| 1975 | Tony Award | Best Performance by a Leading Actress in a Musical | Angela Lansbury | Won |
| 1975 | Tony Award | Best Performance by a Featured Actress in a Musical | Zan Charisse | Nominated |
| 1975 | Tony Award | Best Direction of a Musical | Arthur Laurents | Nominated |
| 1975 | Drama Desk Award | Outstanding Actress in a Musical | Angela Lansbury | Won |
| 1975 | Drama Desk Award | Outstanding Featured Actress in a Musical | Bonnie Langford | Nominated |
| 1975 | Drama Desk Award | Outstanding Director of a Musical | Arthur Laurents | Won |

=== 1989 Broadway revival ===
| Year | Award Ceremony | Category | Nominee | Result |
|---|---|---|---|---|
| 1990 | Tony Award | Best Revival | | Won |
| 1990 | Tony Award | Best Performance by a Leading Actress in a Musical | Tyne Daly | Won |
| 1990 | Tony Award | Best Performance by a Featured Actor in a Musical | Jonathan Hadary | Nominated |
| 1990 | Tony Award | Best Performance by a Featured Actress in a Musical | Crista Moore | Nominated |
| 1990 | Drama Desk Award | Outstanding Revival of a Musical | | Won |
| 1990 | Drama Desk Award | Outstanding Actress in a Musical | Tyne Daly | Won |
| 1990 | Drama Desk Award | Outstanding Featured Actor in a Musical | Jonathan Hadary | Nominated |
| 1990 | Drama Desk Award | Outstanding Featured Actress in a Musical | Crista Moore | Nominated |
| 1991 | Grammy Award | Best Musical Theater Album | | Nominated |

=== 2003 Broadway revival ===
| Year | Award Ceremony | Category | Nominee | Result |
|---|---|---|---|---|
| 2003 | Tony Award | Best Revival of a Musical | | Nominated |
| 2003 | Tony Award | Best Performance by a Leading Actress in a Musical | Bernadette Peters | Nominated |
| 2003 | Tony Award | Best Performance by a Featured Actor in a Musical | John Dossett | Nominated |
| 2003 | Tony Award | Best Performance by a Featured Actress in a Musical | Tammy Blanchard | Nominated |
| 2003 | Drama Desk Award | Outstanding Revival of a Musical | | Nominated |
| 2003 | Drama Desk Award | Outstanding Actress in a Musical | Bernadette Peters | Nominated |
| 2003 | Drama Desk Award | Outstanding Featured Actor in a Musical | John Dossett | Nominated |
| 2003 | Theatre World Award | | Tammy Blanchard | Won |
| 2004 | Grammy Award | Best Musical Theater Album | | Won |

=== 2008 Broadway revival ===
| Year | Award Ceremony | Category | Nominee | Result |
|---|---|---|---|---|
| 2008 | Tony Award | Best Revival of a Musical | | Nominated |
| 2008 | Tony Award | Best Performance by a Leading Actress in a Musical | Patti LuPone | Won |
| 2008 | Tony Award | Best Performance by a Featured Actor in a Musical | Boyd Gaines | Won |
| 2008 | Tony Award | Best Performance by a Featured Actress in a Musical | Laura Benanti | Won |
| 2008 | Tony Award | Best Direction of a Musical | Arthur Laurents | Nominated |
| 2008 | Tony Award | Best Costume Design | Martin Pakledinaz | Nominated |
| 2008 | Tony Award | Best Sound Design | Dan Moses Schreier | Nominated |
| 2008 | Drama Desk Award | Outstanding Revival of a Musical | | Nominated |
| 2008 | Drama Desk Award | Outstanding Actress in a Musical | Patti LuPone | Won |
| 2008 | Drama Desk Award | Outstanding Featured Actor in a Musical | Boyd Gaines | Won |
| 2008 | Drama Desk Award | Outstanding Featured Actress in a Musical | Laura Benanti | Won |
| 2008 | Outer Critics Circle Award | Outstanding Revival of a Musical | | Nominated |
| 2008 | Outer Critics Circle Award | Outstanding Director of a Musical | Arthur Laurents | Nominated |
| 2008 | Outer Critics Circle Award | Outstanding Actor in a Musical | Boyd Gaines | Nominated |
| 2008 | Outer Critics Circle Award | Outstanding Actress in a Musical | Patti LuPone | Won |
| 2008 | Outer Critics Circle Award | Outstanding Featured Actor in a Musical | Tony Yazbeck | Nominated |
| 2008 | Outer Critics Circle Award | Outstanding Featured Actress in a Musical | Laura Benanti | Won |
| 2008 | Grammy Award | Best Musical Theater Album | | Nominated |

=== 2015 West End revival ===
| Year | Award Ceremony | Category | Nominee | Result |
|---|---|---|---|---|
| 2016 | Laurence Olivier Awards | Best Revival of a Musical | | Won |
| 2016 | Laurence Olivier Awards | Best Actress in a Musical | Imelda Staunton | Won |
| 2016 | Laurence Olivier Awards | Best Supporting Actress in a Musical | Lara Pulver | Won |
| 2016 | Laurence Olivier Awards | Best Supporting Actor in a Musical | Peter Davison | Nominated |
| 2016 | Laurence Olivier Awards | Best Supporting Actor in a Musical | Dan Burton | Nominated |
| 2016 | Laurence Olivier Awards | Best Director | Jonathan Kent | Nominated |
| 2016 | Laurence Olivier Awards | Best Lighting Design | Mark Henderson | Won |
| 2016 | Laurence Olivier Awards | Best Theatre Choreographer | Stephen Mear | Nominated |
| 2016 | UK Theatre Awards | Best Musical Production | | Won |
| 2016 | UK Theatre Awards | Best Performance in a Musical | Imelda Staunton | Won |
| 2016 | Evening Standard Theatre Awards | Best Musical Performance | Imelda Staunton | Won |

=== 2024 Broadway revival ===
| Year | Award Ceremony | Category | Nominee | Result |
|---|---|---|---|---|
| 2025 | Drama Desk Awards | Outstanding Revival of a Musical | | Won |
| 2025 | Drama Desk Awards | Outstanding Lead Performance in a Musical | Audra McDonald | Won |
| 2025 | Drama Desk Awards | Outstanding Featured Performance in a Musical | Lesli Margherita | Nominated |
| 2025 | Drama Desk Awards | Outstanding Director of a Musical | George C. Wolfe | Nominated |
| 2025 | Drama Desk Awards | Outstanding Choreography | Camille A. Brown | Nominated |
| 2025 | Drama Desk Awards | Outstanding Costume Design of a Musical | Toni-Leslie James | Nominated |
| 2025 | Drama Desk Awards | Outstanding Sound Design of a Musical | Scott Lehrer | Nominated |
| 2025 | Drama League Awards | Outstanding Revival of a Musical | | Nominated |
| 2025 | Drama League Awards | Outstanding Direction of a Musical | George C. Wolfe | Nominated |
| 2025 | Drama League Awards | Distinguished Performance | Joy Woods | Nominated |
| 2025 | Outer Critics Circle Awards | Outstanding Revival of a Musical | | Nominated |
| 2025 | Outer Critics Circle Awards | Outstanding Lead Performer in a Broadway Musical | Audra McDonald | Nominated |
| 2025 | Outer Critics Circle Awards | Outstanding Featured Performer in a Broadway Musical | Danny Burstein | Nominated |
| 2025 | Tony Awards | Best Revival of a Musical | | Nominated |
| 2025 | Tony Awards | Best Leading Actress in a Musical | Audra McDonald | Nominated |
| 2025 | Tony Awards | Best Featured Actress in a Musical | Joy Woods | Nominated |
| 2025 | Tony Awards | Best Featured Actor in a Musical | Danny Burstein | Nominated |
| 2025 | Tony Awards | Best Choreography | Camille A. Brown | Nominated |
| 2025 | Chita Rivera Awards | Outstanding Dancer in a Broadway Show | Kevin Csolak | Won |
