= Dan Burton (actor) =

British actor

Dan Burton (born in 1985) is a British actor best known for his work in musical theatre. He trained at Laine Theatre Arts in Epsom, Surrey, England, and received an MA degree from Middlesex University, London.

== Career ==
Burton's early credits included ensemble roles in the UK tour of Miss Saigon and the West End productions of Chicago and Dirty Dancing, from 2006 to 2008. He then went on to play Bernardo in the 2009 UK tour of West Side Story.

He played the role of Nikos/Padamadan in the original West End cast of Legally Blonde (2010). He appeared in the ensemble of another West End show, Betty Blue Eyes, in 2011, in which at one point he appeared as Prince Philip, Duke of Edinburgh. Burton joined the cast of Jersey Boys at the Prince Edward Theatre as Joe Pesci/Frankie Valli in 2012. He then appeared as Earl in the Chichester Festival Theatre production of The Pajama Game, with which he transferred to the West End in 2014.

He played Tulsa in the 2015 West End revival of Gypsy, for which he was nominated for the 2016 Laurence Olivier Award for Best Actor in a Supporting Role in a Musical. The reviewer for The Hollywood Reporter wrote that Burton "blows the doors off... with his big number, "All I Need Is the Girl.'" The Stage commented that "Burton danced up a storm as Tulsa in [Gypsy], really earning his nomination"].

Other roles have included Don Lockwood in Singin' in the Rain in 2015, and Billy Lawlor in 42nd Street in 2016, both at the Du Chatelet in Paris, France. In 2016, he starred as Gene Donen in the short musical film Listen Up Emily. He starred as Jerry Travers in 2017 in a stage adaptation of Top Hat at Kilworth House Theatre. Mark Shenton, in The Stage, called his performance "versatile and charming. ... Burton not only has an effortless, square-jawed matinee idol charm, he also sings the score as gorgeously as he dances it." Also in 2017, Burton released an album called Broadway Melodies.

In 2018 he appeared as Harry the Horse in Guys and Dolls in concert at the Royal Albert Hall, and from 2018 to 2019 he appeared as Giles Ralston in Agatha Christie’s The Mousetrap at London's St Martins Theatre.

Burton returned to the West End in late 2019 as Phil Davis in White Christmas. He had performed the role at the Curve theatre in Leicester in 2018, where a reviewer praised his use of "his expressive face to great effect in comic business". After the West End run, he toured in the role.

In 2022, Burton received a Master of Arts degree from Middlesex University, London.
