= You Gotta Get a Gimmick (song) =

1959 song from the musical Gypsy

Song by Chotzi Foley, Faith Dane, Maria Karnilova, Milton Rosenstock, and the cast of Gypsy

from the album Gypsy
- Released: 1959
- Genre: Show tune
- Length: 4:03
- Songwriter(s): Jule Styne; Stephen Sondheim

"You Gotta Get a Gimmick", also known as "You Gotta Have a Gimmick", is a song from the 1959 musical Gypsy, with music by Jule Styne and lyrics by Stephen Sondheim. The 1959 rendition of the song was sung by Chotzi Foley, Faith Dane, Maria Karnilova and Milton Rosenstock.

== Synopsis ==
TheaterMania describes the song plot as a "threesome of hilariously costumed veteran burlesque dancers...who teach Louise the ropes of stripping."

== Critical reception ==
New City Stage describes it as "endearingly bawdy." Time Out Chicago said the song is "this production’s hands-down highlight...in which three burlesque vets pull out all the stops." Stage and Cinema wrote the song was performed by the "show-stopping, scene-stealing...Tessie Tura, Mazeppa and Electra, the stripper specialists in 'You Gotta Get a Gimmick,'" adding, "It's the ultimate tribute to Darwinian adaptation, the secret of showbiz survival and even success." CurtainUp said the song is "show-stopping" and "outrageously funny." TheaterMania called the song "scene-stealing." NipperTown described it as a "novelty song." The Spokesman-Review named it a "showstopper."
