= Gypsy Rose Lee =

American burlesque performer, actress and writer (1911–1970)

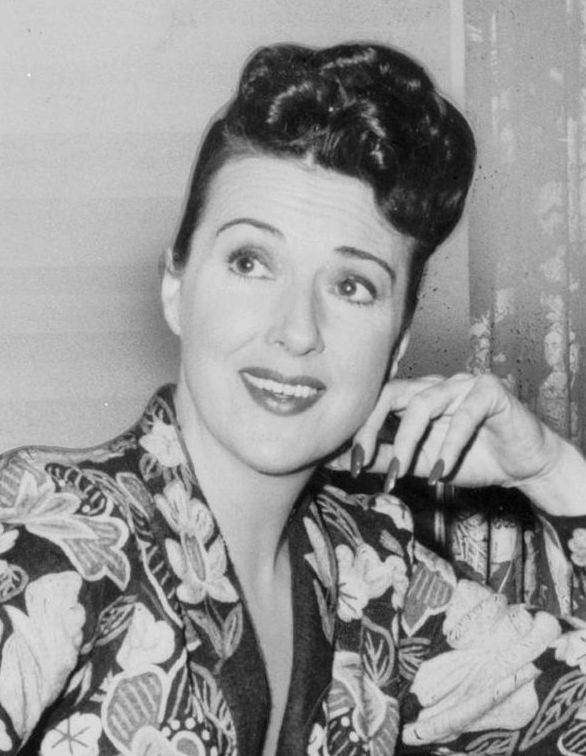
- Lee in 1956
- Born: Rose Louise Hovick; January 8, 1911; Seattle, Washington, U.S.
- Died: April 26, 1970 (aged 59); Los Angeles, California, U.S.
- Resting place: Inglewood Park Cemetery
- Occupations: Actress; writer; vedette; dancer; entertainer; stripper
- Years active: 1928–1970
- Height: 5 ft 8 in (173 cm)
- Spouses: Robert Mizzy (m. 1937; div. 1941) Alexander Kirkland (m. 1942; div. 1944) Julio de Diego (m. 1948; div. 1955)
- Children: Erik Lee Preminger
- Parent: Rose Thompson Hovick
- Relatives: June Havoc (sister)

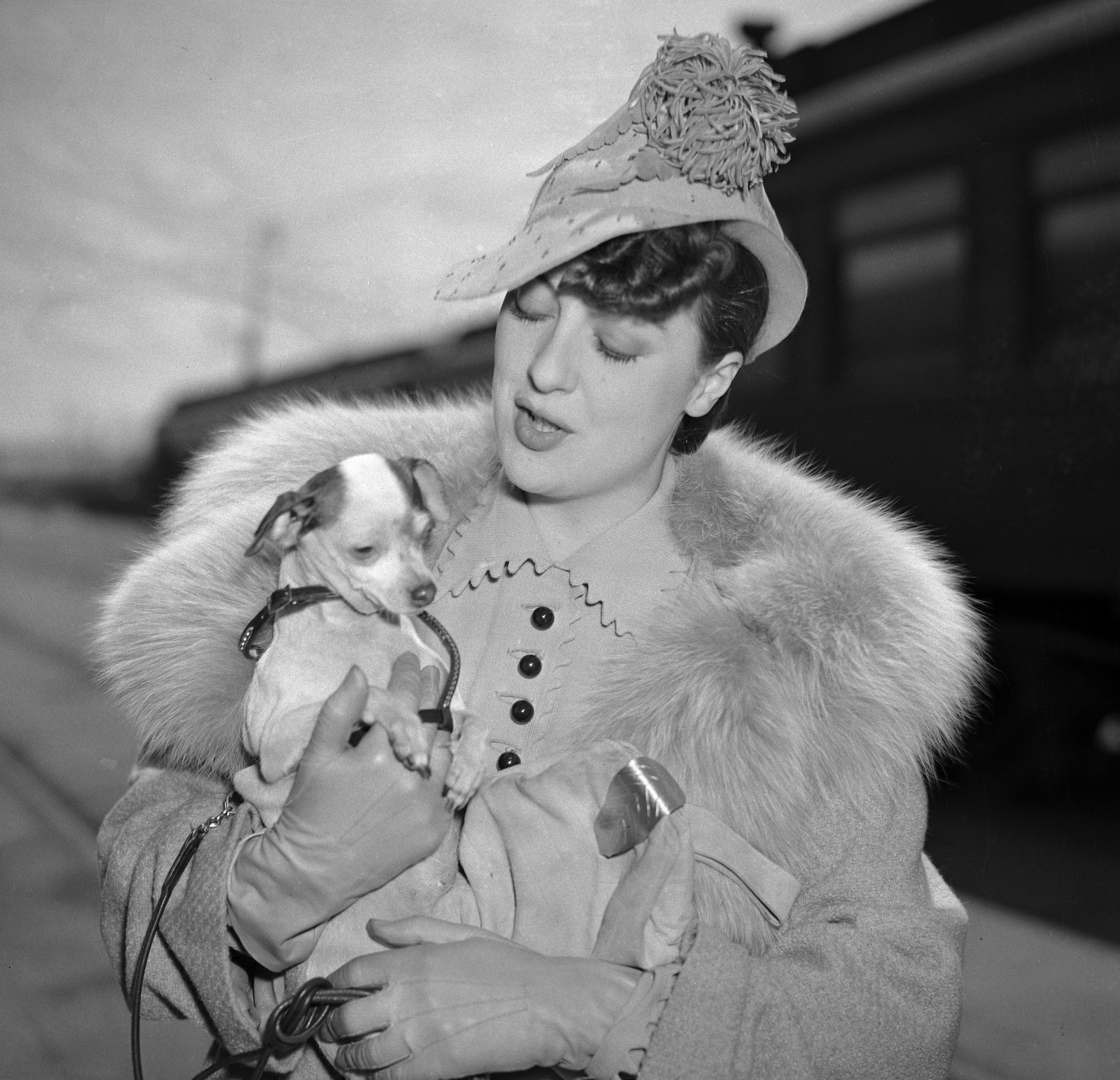
Gypsy Rose Lee in Los Angeles, c. 1937

Gypsy Rose Lee (born Rose Louise Hovick, January 8, 1911 – April 26, 1970) was an American burlesque entertainer, stripper, actress, author, playwright and vedette, famous for her striptease act. Her 1957 memoir, Gypsy: A Memoir, was adapted into the 1959 stage musical Gypsy.

== Early life ==
Rose Louise Hovick was born in Seattle, Washington, on January 8, 1911; (Note: Abbott (2012) presents a photocopy of an apparently non-certified certificate of live birth with some handwritten parts, from the King County Health Department, Record# 193, File # 1388, indicates January 8, 1911, although Lee always gave January 9 as her date of birth.) however, she always gave January 9 as her date of birth. She was known as Louise to her family. Her sister, actress June Havoc, was born in 1912. Their mother, Rose Thompson Hovick (whose maternal grandparents were German), forged various birth certificates for each of her daughters—older when needed to evade varying state child labor laws, and younger for reduced or free train fares. The girls were unsure until later in life what their years of birth were.

Their mother had married Norwegian-American John Olaf Hovick, a newspaper-advertising salesman and a reporter at The Seattle Times. They married on May 28, 1910, in Seattle. They divorced on August 20, 1915. Rose Thompson married her second husband, Judson Brennerman, a traveling salesman, on May 26, 1916, at a Unitarian church in Seattle, with the Rev. J. D. A. Powers officiating.

After Hovick and Brennerman divorced, June supported the family by appearing in vaudeville, being billed "Tiniest Toe Dancer in the World" when she was only 2 1/2. Rose and June went to Hollywood for two years where June appeared in short films directed by Hal Roach. Louise was left behind while June and her mother were on the road. She had an elementary education, unlike June who was taught to read by stagehands. Much to her mother's displeasure, June eloped with Bobby Reed, a dancer in their act, in December 1928, after a performance in Topeka, Kansas, at the Jayhawk Theatre and went on to pursue a brief career in marathon dancing, a more profitable vocation than tap dancing.

== Career ==
Louise's singing and dancing talents were insufficient to sustain the act without June. Eventually, it became apparent Louise could make money in burlesque, which earned her legendary status as an elegant and witty striptease artist. Initially, her act was propelled forward when a shoulder strap on one of her gowns gave way, causing her dress to fall to her feet despite her efforts to cover herself; encouraged by the audience's response, she went on to make the trick the focus of her performance.

Her innovations were an almost casual stripping style compared to bump & grind styles of most burlesque strippers (she emphasized the "tease" in "striptease"), and she brought a sharp sense of humor into her act as well. She became as famous for her onstage wit as for her stripping style, and—changing her stage name to Gypsy Rose Lee—she became one of the biggest stars of Minsky's Burlesque, where she performed for four years. She was frequently arrested in raids on the Minsky brothers' shows. During the Great Depression, Lee spoke at various union meetings in support of New York laborers. According to activist Harry Fisher, her talks were among those that attracted the largest audiences.

In 1937 and 1938, billed as Louise Hovick, she made five films in Hollywood. But her acting was generally panned, so she returned to New York City where she had an affair with film producer Michael Todd and co-produced and appeared in his 1942 musical revue, Star and Garter. Lee viewed herself as a "high-class" stripper, and she approved of H. L. Mencken's term "ecdysiast", which he coined as a more "dignified" way of referring to the profession. Her style of intellectual recitation while stripping was spoofed in the number "Zip!" in Rodgers and Hart's Pal Joey, a musical in which June Havoc had appeared on Broadway, opposite Gene Kelly. Lee performed an abbreviated version of her act (intellectual recitation and all) in the 1943 film Stage Door Canteen.

In 1941, Lee wrote a mystery thriller called The G-String Murders, which was made into the sanitized 1943 film, Lady of Burlesque, starring Barbara Stanwyck. While some assert this was in fact ghost-written by Craig Rice, there are some who claim there is more than sufficient written evidence in the form of manuscripts and Lee's own correspondence to prove that she wrote a large part of the novel herself under the guidance of Rice and others, including her editor George Davis, a friend and mentor.

Lee's second murder mystery, Mother Finds a Body, was published in 1942. In December 1942, preliminary papers alleging breach of contract were filed in the Supreme Court against Lee by Dorothy Wheelock, associate editor of Harper's Bazaar magazine, alleging that in August 1940 she and Lee entered into what Wheelock described as "an oral agreement to collaborate on a joint venture involving the conception, construction, development, writing and exploitation of a literary work with a burlesque background." Wheelock alleged that, though the agreement held that half of the income from the book would go to her and the other half to Lee, Lee cancelled the collaboration in November of 1940 (when Wheelock had already found a publisher for their project) and had the finished work published by Simon & Schuster under her own name. Lee claimed, contrariwise, that a "sample book" which Wheelock had written based on Lee's notes was too dissimilar to the published book for her actions to have constituted a breach of contract. The case was settled out of court.

== Political activism ==
Like well-known artists such as Pablo Picasso and Ernest Hemingway, Gypsy Rose Lee was a supporter of the Popular Front movement in the Spanish Civil War and raised money for charity to alleviate the suffering of Spanish children during the conflict. "She became politically active and supported Spanish Loyalists during Spain's Civil War. She also became a fixture at Communist United Front meetings, and was investigated by the House Committee on un-American activities."

== Relationships ==
In Hollywood, Lee married Arnold "Bob" Mizzy on August 25, 1937, at the insistence of Twentieth Century-Fox production head Darryl F. Zanuck. She obtained a divorce in 1941, claiming cruelty, although biographer Noralee Frankel suggests the couple agreed that Lee could bring false charges so the divorce could go through uncontested. In 1942, she married William Alexander Kirkland; they divorced in 1944. While married to Kirkland, she gave birth on December 11, 1944, to a son fathered by Otto Preminger. Her son was named Erik Lee, but has since been known successively as Erik Kirkland, Erik de Diego, and Erik Lee Preminger. Lee married a third time in 1948, to Julio de Diego, but that union also ended in divorce.

In 1940, she purchased a townhouse on East 63rd Street in Manhattan with a private courtyard, 26 rooms and seven baths. Mother Rose continued to demand money from Lee and Havoc. Lee rented a ten-room apartment on West End Avenue in Manhattan for Rose, who opened a boardinghouse for women there. On one occasion in the 1930s, Rose Thompson Hovick allegedly shot and killed a woman who was either a guest at the boardinghouse or a guest on the farm in Highland Mills in Orange County, New York Rose owned. A historical website cites varying reports of which place was the scene of the crime. According to Gypsy's son, Erik Lee Preminger, who is the author of several books, the murder victim was Mother Rose's female lover, who had allegedly made a pass at Gypsy. The violent incident was investigated and reportedly explained away as a suicide. Mother Rose was not prosecuted.

Mother Rose's biographer strongly rejects the possibility this woman, Genevieve Augustine, was Rose's lover, and doubts Rose's complicity in her death in light of Augustine's purported previous suicide attempts. Rose Thompson Hovick died in 1954 of colon cancer.

== Later years ==
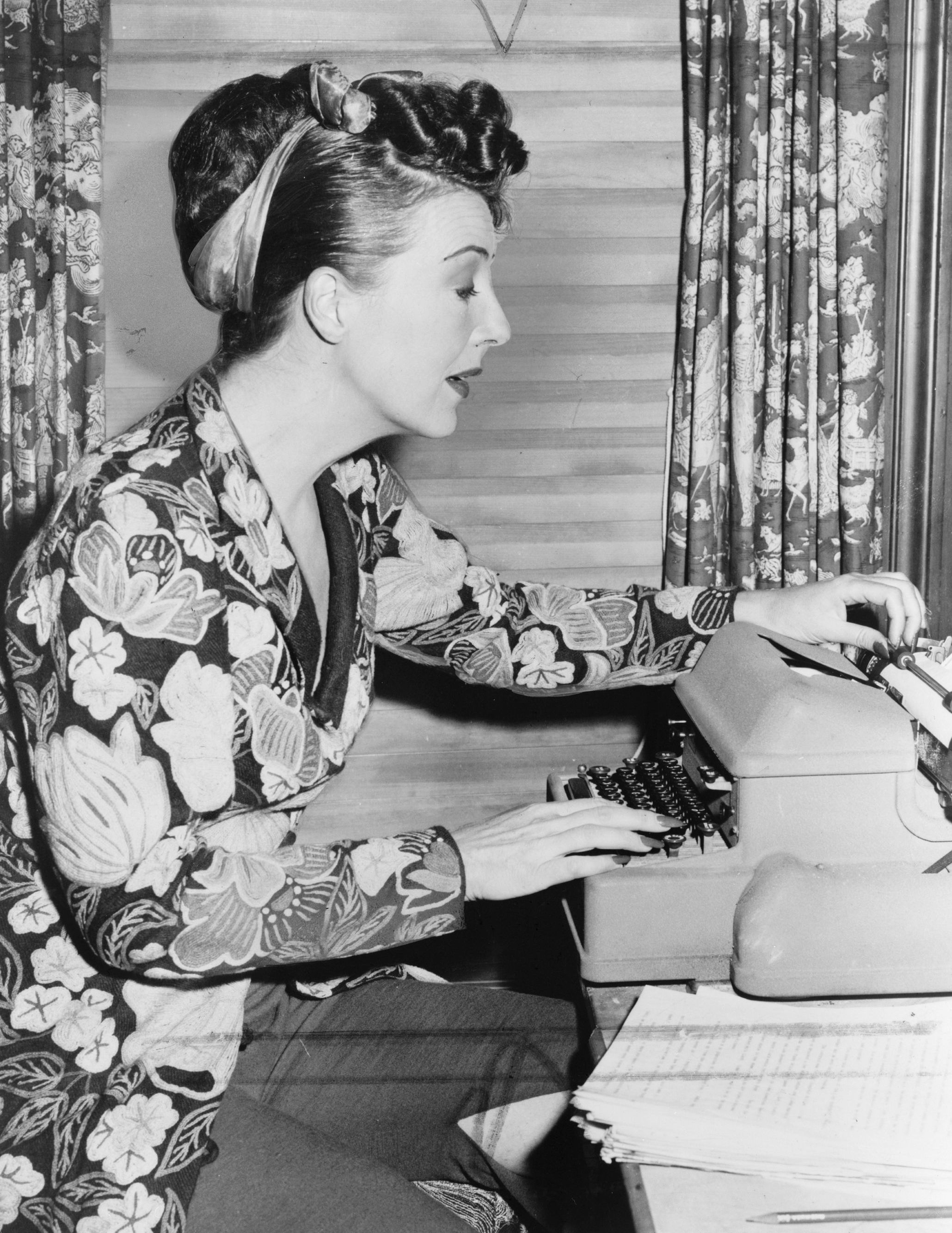
Gypsy Rose Lee in 1956

After the death of their mother, the sisters felt free to write about her without risking a lawsuit. Gypsy: A Memoir was published in 1957 and served as inspiration for the Jule Styne, Stephen Sondheim, and Arthur Laurents 1959 musical Gypsy. June did not like the way she was portrayed in the piece, although she was eventually persuaded not to oppose it for her sister's sake. The show and the 1962 movie adaptation assured Gypsy a steady income. The sisters were estranged for a period of time but later on reconciled. June, in turn, wrote Early Havoc and More Havoc, to tell her version of their history.

Lee went on to host a daytime San Francisco KGO-TV television talk show, The Gypsy Rose Lee Show (754 episodes, aired 1965–1968). The popular afternoon show featured such guests as Judy Garland, Agnes Moorehead, and Woody Allen, showcasing her love of people, pets and knitting, among other interests.

The walls of her Los Angeles home were adorned with pictures by Joan Miró, Pablo Picasso, Marc Chagall, Max Ernst, and Dorothea Tanning, all reportedly given to her by the artists themselves.

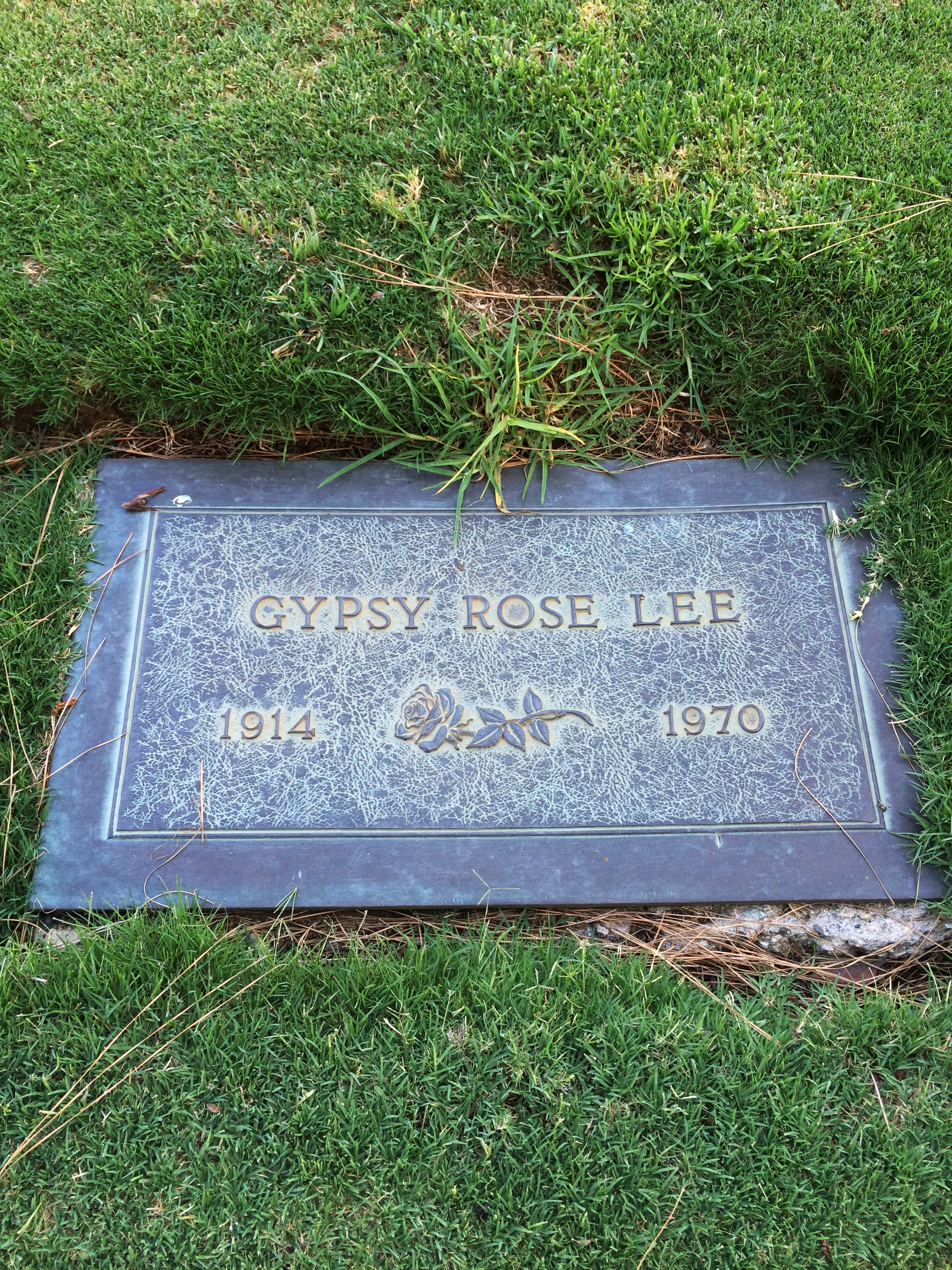
Grave of Gypsy Rose Lee at Inglewood Park Cemetery (with wrong year of birth)

In 1969, she performed for American troops in Vietnam, who, she said, "considered her their sexy grandmother".

== Death ==
Lee died as the result of lung cancer in Los Angeles in 1970, aged 59. Upon her death, she left an estate valued at US$575,000 (equivalent to $4,767,000 in 2025). She is buried in Inglewood Park Cemetery in Inglewood, California.

== Legacy ==
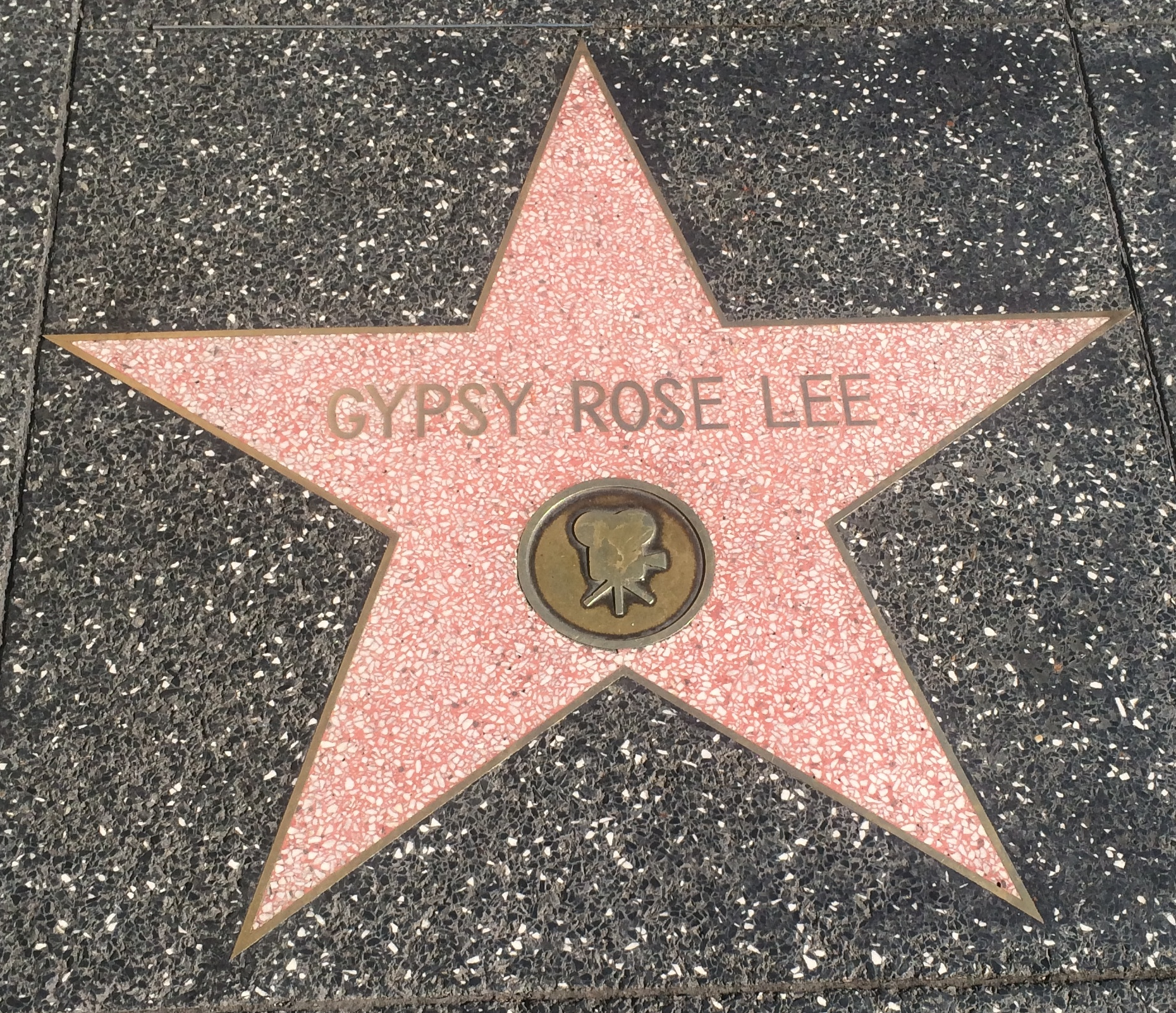
Lee's star on the Hollywood Walk of Fame

- The song "Zip" from the musical Pal Joey, written by Richard Rodgers and Lorenz Hart, imagines the thoughts and musings which went through Gypsy Rose Lee's mind while she stripped onstage, as recounted by a newspaper reporter who sings of her interview with Miss Lee as having been "my greatest achievement" in a career full of notable celebrity interviews. Elaine Stritch regularly performed this song (as the interviewer) for many years.
- Punk band The Distillers wrote "Gypsy Rose Lee", a song for their debut album in 2000.
- In 1973, Tony Orlando and Dawn recorded "Say, Has Anybody Seen My Sweet Gypsy Rose" by W. M. Irwin Levine & L. Russell Brown. (The song refers to Lee's profession but is about a fictional character with a similar name.)
- In January 2012, Seattle Theater Writers (a group of arts critics for various publications) awarded the first Gypsy Rose Lee Awards, celebrating excellence in local theatre.
- The Academy Film Archive has preserved a number of Lee's home movies, including behind-the-scenes footage from films in which she appeared.

== Selected stage work ==
Stage
Year	Title	Role	Notes
1933	George White’s Melody	herself under the name Rose Louise	Casino Theatre
1936	Ziegfeld Follies	herself	Winter Garden Theatre
1939	I Must Love Someone	Birdie Carr	Vanderbilt Theatre
1940	Du Barry Was a Lady	May Daly	46th Street Theatre
1940	Panama Hattie	Panama Hattie substituting for Ethel Merman	46th Street Theatre
1943	Star And Garter	herself	The Music Box Theatre
1954	The Naked Genius	Honey Bee Carroll	New Parsons Theatre, Hartford, CT
1956	Fancy Meeting You	Amanda Phipps	Casino Theatre, Newport, RI
1958	Happy Hunting	Liz Livingstone	Westbury Music Fair
1961	The Threepenny Opera	Jenny	Royal Alexandra Theatre, Toronto
1961	Auntie Mame	Auntie Mame	Kenley Players, Columbus, OH
1961	A Curious Evening with Gypsy Rose Lee	herself	Las Palmas Theatre, Hollywood, CA

== Filmography ==
Film
Year	Title	Role
1937	You Can't Have Everything	Lulu Riley
1937	Ali Baba Goes to Town	Sultana / Louise Hovick
1938	Sally, Irene and Mary	Joyce Taylor
1938	Battle of Broadway	Linda Lee
1938	My Lucky Star	Marcelle La Verne
1943	Stage Door Canteen	Gypsy Rose Lee
1944	Belle of the Yukon	Belle De Valle
1952	Babes in Bagdad	Zohara
1958	Screaming Mimi	Joann 'Gypsy' Masters
1958	Wind Across the Everglades	Mrs. Bradford
1963	The Stripper	Madame Olga
1966	The Trouble with Angels	Mrs. Phipps
1969	The Over-the-Hill Gang	Cassie

Television
Year	Title	Role	Notes
1949	Think Fast	Herself - Host	
1950	What's My Line?		lost episode #4, Season 1
1958	The Gypsy Rose Lee Show		
1959	What's My Line?		
1963	Fractured Flickers	Herself	episode 3—interview
1964	The Object Is	Herself	game show - 5 episodes
1964	Burke's Law	Miss Bumpsy Cathcart	Who Killed Vaudeville
1965	Who Has Seen the Wind?	Proprietress	TV movie
1965-1967	Gypsy	Herself - Hostess	26 episodes
1966	The Pruitts of Southampton	Regina	4 episodes
1966	Batman	Newscaster	1 episode, Uncredited
1967	Around the World of Mike Todd	Herself	TV movie documentary
1969	The Over-the-Hill Gang	Cassie	ABC Movie of the Week (final film role)
1969	The Hollywood Squares	Herself - Panelist	114 episodes

== Recordings ==
Recordings
Year	Title	Role	Notes
1960	An Evening with Gypsy Rose Lee	LP record	AEI Records
1962	Gypsy Rose Lee Remembers Burlesque	LP record	Stereoddities

== Works ==
=== Novels ===
- The G-String Murders (New York: Simon & Schuster, 1941).
- Mother Finds a Body (New York: Simon & Schuster, 1942).

=== Memoir ===
- Gypsy: A Memoir (New York: Harper & Bros., 1957)

=== Plays ===
- The Naked Genius (1943) (filmed and released as Doll Face in 1946). Her original title for the play was The Ghost in the Woodpile.

== See also ==
- Barbara Rutherford Hatch House, which Lee acquired in 1940
