= Together (Wherever We Go) =

Song by Jule Styne

Song

from the album Gypsy
- Released: 1959
- Genre: show tune
- Composer: Jule Styne
- Lyricist: Stephen Sondheim

"Together (Wherever We Go)" is a song, now considered a standard, with music by Jule Styne and lyrics by Stephen Sondheim, written for the musical play Gypsy in 1959. It was introduced by Ethel Merman, Jack Klugman, and Sandra Church.

== Recorded versions ==
- Tammy Blanchard
- The Four Lads
- Judy Garland and Liza Minnelli (live)
- Liza Minnelli on her 1964 studio album Liza! Liza!
- The Hi-Los
- Adam Makowicz and George Mraz
- Ethel Merman & Jack Klugman
- Jack Klugman & Tony Randall on the album The Odd Couple Sings
- Angela Lansbury & Barrie Ingham in the original London cast recording
- Bette Midler in the TV film Gypsy (1993)
- Bernadette Peters
- Patti LuPone
- Steve and Eydie
- Rosalind Russell in the film Gypsy (1962) - the number was included in the version shown to preview audiences but cut before the film went into wide release
- The song was sung by Danny Thomas and Marlo Thomas (accompanied off-camera by Milton Berle) on a 1971 episode of That Girl (Season 5, Episode 15)
- It was also featured in "The Show Must Go On", a fourth season episode of The Brady Bunch, sung by Florence Henderson and Maureen McCormick
- The song was the final number for the 1973 ABC television special Break Up which starred Bernadette Peters, Bruce Davison, Barbara Sharma, and Carl Ballantine
- Joey and Matthew Lawrence in the 65th Annual Macy's Thanksgiving Day Parade
- Gavin Creel and Sara Topham in the 2003 TV film Eloise at Christmastime.
