= Gypsy: A Memoir =

1957 autobiography by Gypsy Rose Lee

- Front cover, with Gypsy Rose Lee
- Author: Gypsy Rose Lee
- Language: English
- Genre: Memoir
- Publisher: Harper & Bros.
- Pages: 337 pp

Gypsy: A Memoir is a 1957 autobiography of renowned American striptease artist Gypsy Rose Lee, which inspired the 1959 Broadway musical Gypsy: A Musical Fable. The book tells Lee's true life story in three acts beginning with her early childhood days in theatre when she toured with her sister, June Havoc. The book ends just as Lee has gotten on a train and is headed to Hollywood to begin her career in the movies. Her Hollywood career was short lived and she did not get many roles. The roles she did get were so small that at one point she wanted to be billed under her birth name, Louise Hovick.

The first edition was published by Harper in 1957. It is now available in a 1999 paperback reprint.
