= Maria Karnilova =

American dancer and actress (1920–2001)

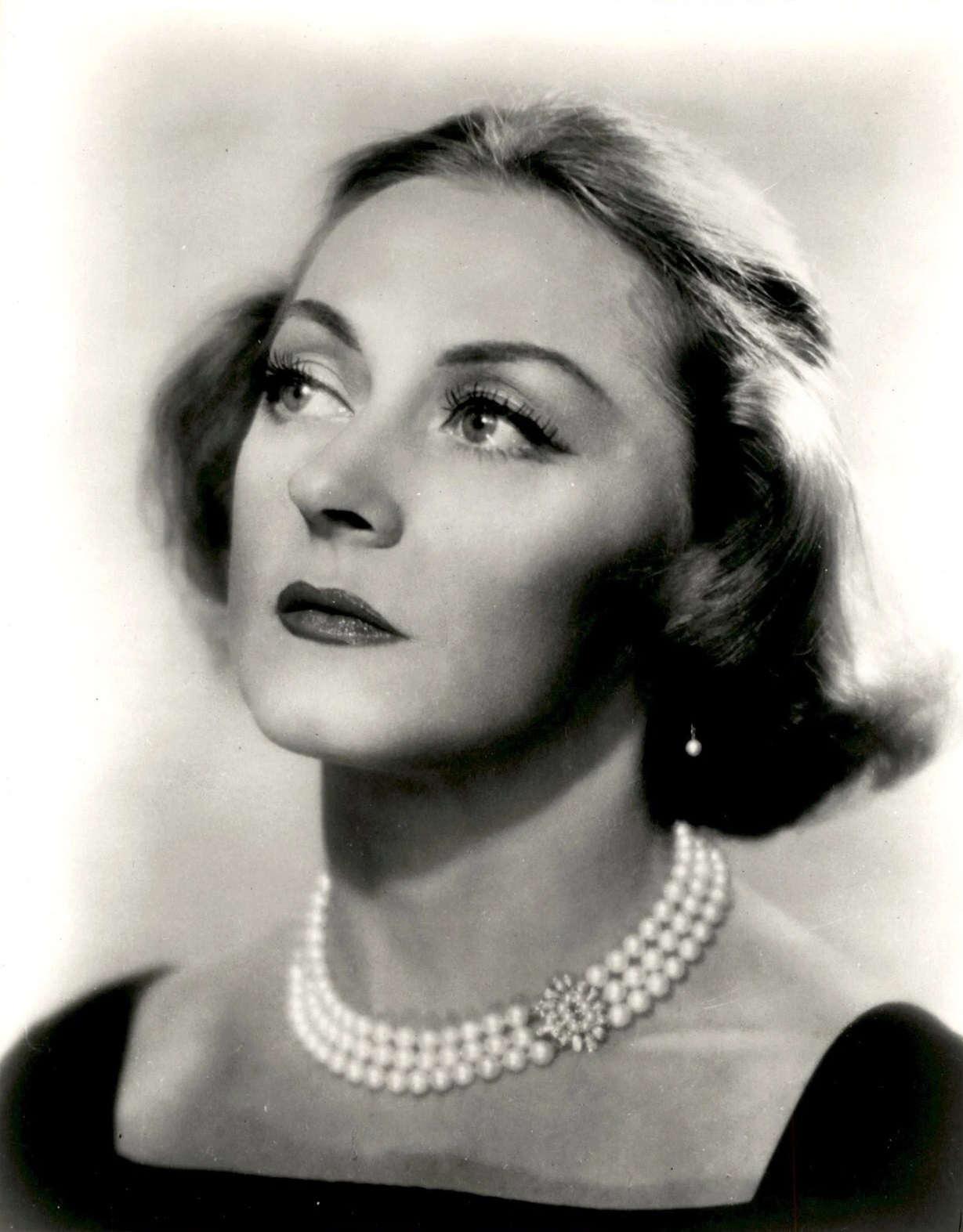
- Karnilova in 1974
- Born: Maria Dovgolenko (or Dowholonok); August 3, 1920; Hartford, Connecticut, U.S.
- Died: April 20, 2001 (aged 80); New York, New York, U.S.
- Other names: Maria Karniloff; Maria Karnilovitch; Maria Irving
- Occupations: Dancer, actress
- Years active: 1946–1988
- Spouse: George S. Irving (m. 1948)

Maria Karnilova (August 3, 1920 – April 20, 2001) was an American dancer and actress. She was initially known legally as Maria Karniloff.

She was born in Hartford, Connecticut, the daughter of Filip (Philip) and Stefanida Dovgolenko (or Dowholonok), emigrants from Tsarist Russia. The family later moved to Brooklyn, New York. She started her professional career in 1927 in the Children's Ballet of the Metropolitan Opera and joined the corps when Ballet Theater, now American Ballet Theatre, was founded in 1939. She adopted the name Karniloff, and later, Karnilova as her professional name. Her professional surname was often ascribed as her own mother's maiden name, however, that is inaccurate as her mother's maiden name was "Shlonskaya".

Karnilova made her Broadway debut in 1946 in Call Me Mister. She won the Tony Award for Best Featured Actress in a Musical for the role of Golde in the original 1964 production of Fiddler on the Roof starring Zero Mostel and was nominated as Tony Award for Best Actress in a Musical for Zorba (1968).

Other Broadway credits include Miss Liberty (1949), Two's Company (1952), Jerome Robbins' Ballet: U.S.A. (1958), Gypsy (as the original "Tessie Tura"; 1959), Bravo Giovanni (1962), Gigi (1973), God's Favorite (1974), Bring Back Birdie (1981), and the 1981 revival of Fiddler. Her film credits include The Unsinkable Molly Brown (1964) and Married to the Mob (1988).

== Family ==
She was married to actor George S. Irving from 1948 until her death from undisclosed causes in Manhattan at the age of 80 in 2001. She was survived by her husband, two children, three grandchildren, and extended family. Her widower, George S. Irving, died in 2016, aged 94.

== Filmography ==
Year	Title	Role	Notes
1964	The Unsinkable Molly Brown	Daphne	
1988	Married to the Mob	Frank's Mom	(final film role)
