= Rose's Turn =

1959 song from musical Gypsy

Song by Ethel Merman

from the album Gypsy – A Musical Fable
- Released: 1959
- Genre: Show tune
- Label: Columbia Masterworks
- Composer: Jule Styne
- Lyricist: Stephen Sondheim

"Rose's Turn" is a song from the musical Gypsy. It has been performed by such actresses as Ethel Merman (who originated the role of Rose on Broadway), Bette Midler, Angela Lansbury, Tyne Daly, Betty Buckley, Patti LuPone, Bernadette Peters, Imelda Staunton, and Audra McDonald. The song is often regarded as the pinnacle of the eleven o'clock number.

== Synopsis ==
The song "occurs at the point when Mama Rose realizes the frustrations of having little to show for the sacrifices that have left her with two seemingly ungrateful children." At this point in the show, Mama Rose is "a character whose dreams were too strong and whose heart held her own feelings hostage to make those dreams come true." She "finally drops her facade and admits her frustration and despair." Pittsburgh Post-Gazette argues the "unmasking of her psyche" takes place during the song.

== Production ==
The song was written by Jule Styne with lyrics by Stephen Sondheim. As the finale, it contains a number of callbacks to songs from earlier in the show. Bette Midler, who performed the show in the television movie, said the song is her favorite piece from the show: "It's a terrifying piece of music because it's one of the two most famous arias in the musical comedy lexicon, the other being 'Soliloquy' from Carousel."

== Critical reception ==
Chicago magazine described it as "show-stopping." Michael Kuchwara, notable theater critic for the Associated Press, described it as a "blazing finale." The Hour named it a "showstopping tour-de-force." The Spokesman-Review wrote the song "may not match the other songs for lyrics and melodic value, but its emotional effect is riveting", and described it as a "magical moment." Boca Raton News names it a "torch song" and the "dramatic high point." Toledo Blade wrote "when [Mama Rose] sings 'Rose's Turn', a touching reflection of who she is and what she gave up for her daughters, we finally understand the passions that drove her." Kuchwara in another AP review called it a "stunning musical soliloquy," adding "it's here where Rose pours out her true feelings, letting the rage and frustration of a stymied life explode." Variety called it "one of the most affecting songs of the musical theater."

=== Glee version ===
"Rose's Turn" was featured on the Glee episode “Laryngitis” in 2010, sung by Kurt Hummel (Chris Colfer). It was released on the deluxe version of Glee: The Music, Volume 3 Showstoppers the same year.
