= Faith Dane =

American actress (1923–2020)

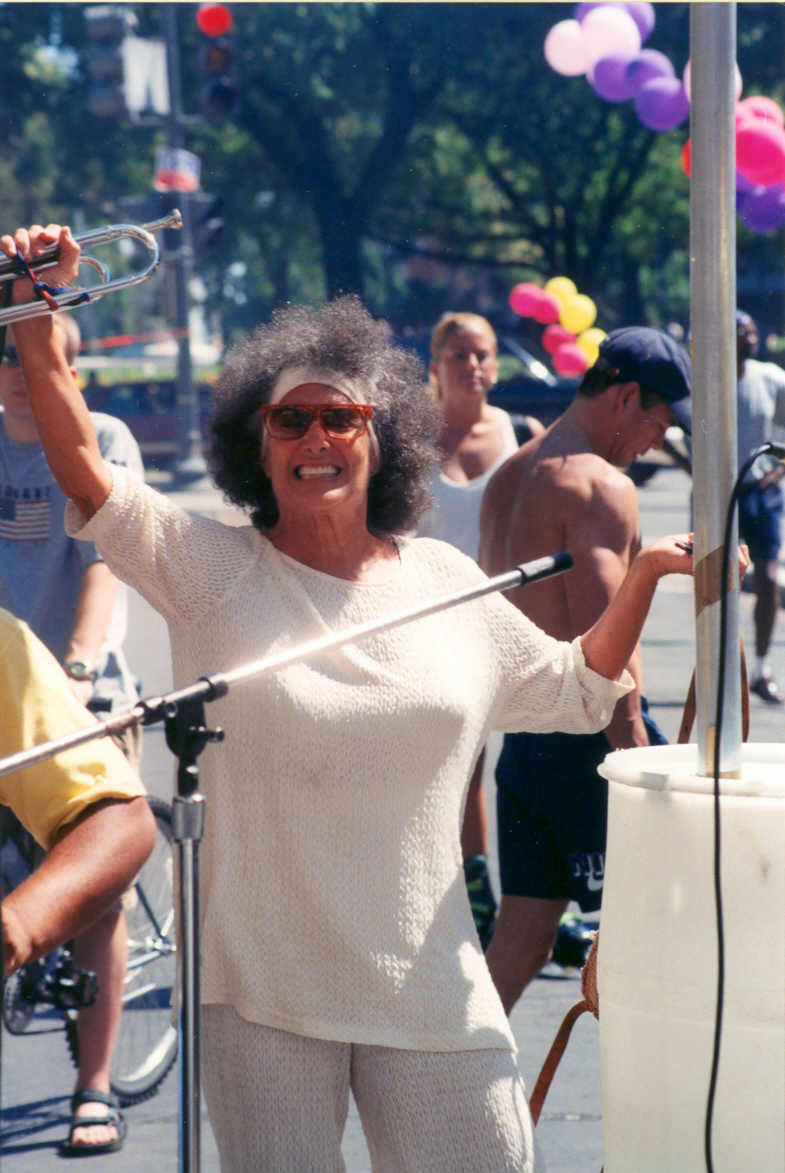
- Born: October 3, 1923
- Died: April 7, 2020 (aged 96); Washington, D.C., U.S.
- Other names: Faith Crannitch, Faith
- Occupations: Actress, musician, artist

Faith Dane (October 3, 1923 – April 7, 2020), sometimes known since her second marriage as Faith Crannitch but legally simply Faith since 1983, was an American actress, musician, artist, and perennial candidate for elected office in Washington, D.C.

== Background ==
Dane was a resident of Washington, D.C., but grew up and spent much of her life in New York City; she also lived in the United States Virgin Islands for much of the 1960s. She was married twice; first, in the 1960s, to attorney Russell Johnson, a former attorney general of the U.S. Virgin Islands, who first encouraged her to run for office, and secondly, in 1983, to Jude Crannitch, an artist originally from New Zealand.

Dane played the bugle-tooting burlesque stripper Mazeppa ("Once I was a schlepper, now I'm Miss Mazeppa") in both the original Broadway and film versions of Gypsy. When Gypsy was revived on Broadway without her, she sued, claiming she'd created much of the characterization of Mazeppa herself; though the suit was unsuccessful, producers developed a “Faith Dane clause” in actors' contracts granting rights in any creative work actors do developing their character to the production.

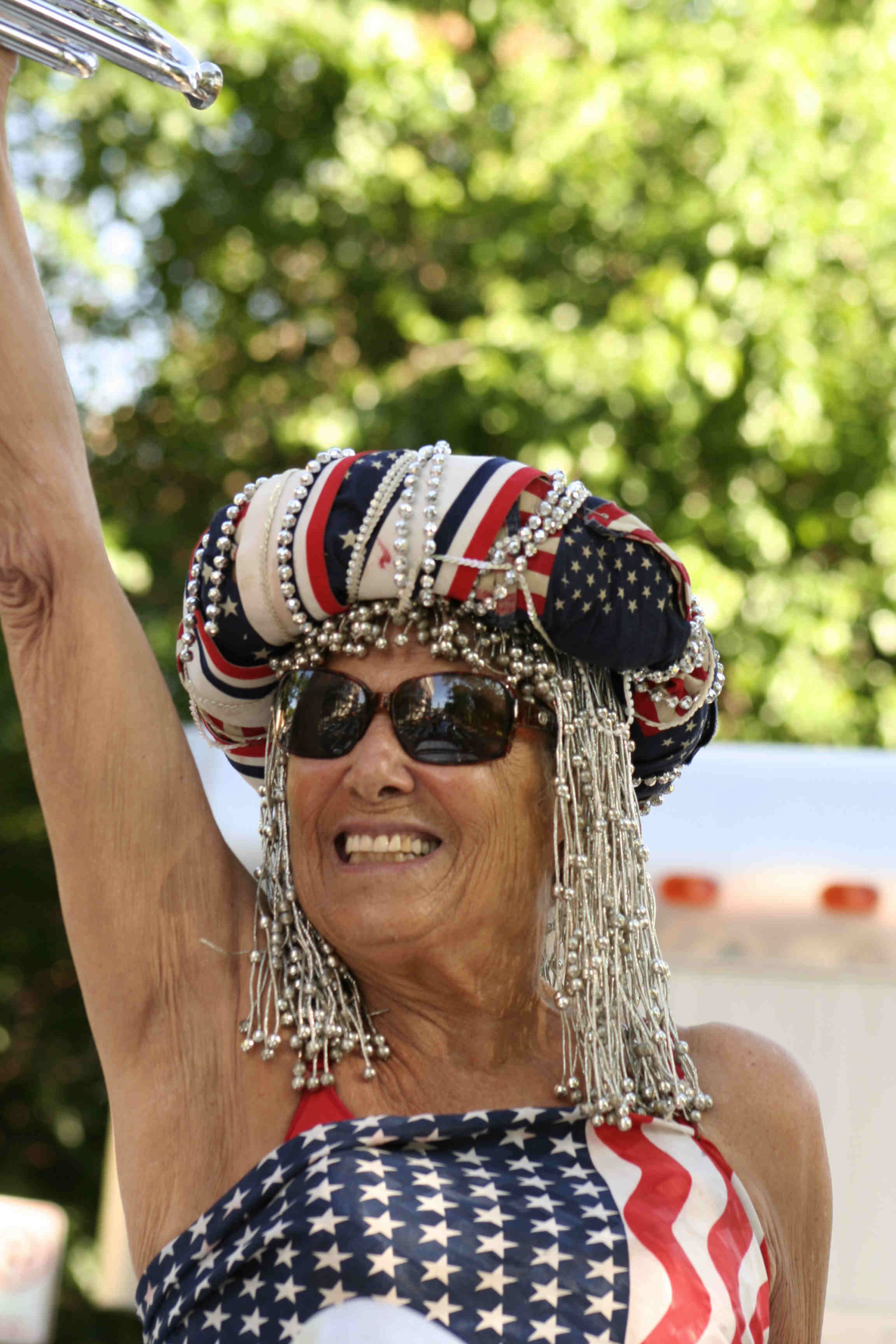
Dane at Capital Pride in 2006

Dane was a candidate for the Virgin Islands Legislature in 1964 on an arts support-based platform. She raised funds for various school art programs there, including St. Dunstan's Episcopal High School. After moving to Washington in the 1980s, she was a candidate for mayor as an independent in 1990, 1994, and 1998, garnering 110, 423, and 430 votes, respectively. In 2002, she ran in the Democratic primary for mayor and received 1,084 votes. On each occasion, she ran on an arts-based platform.

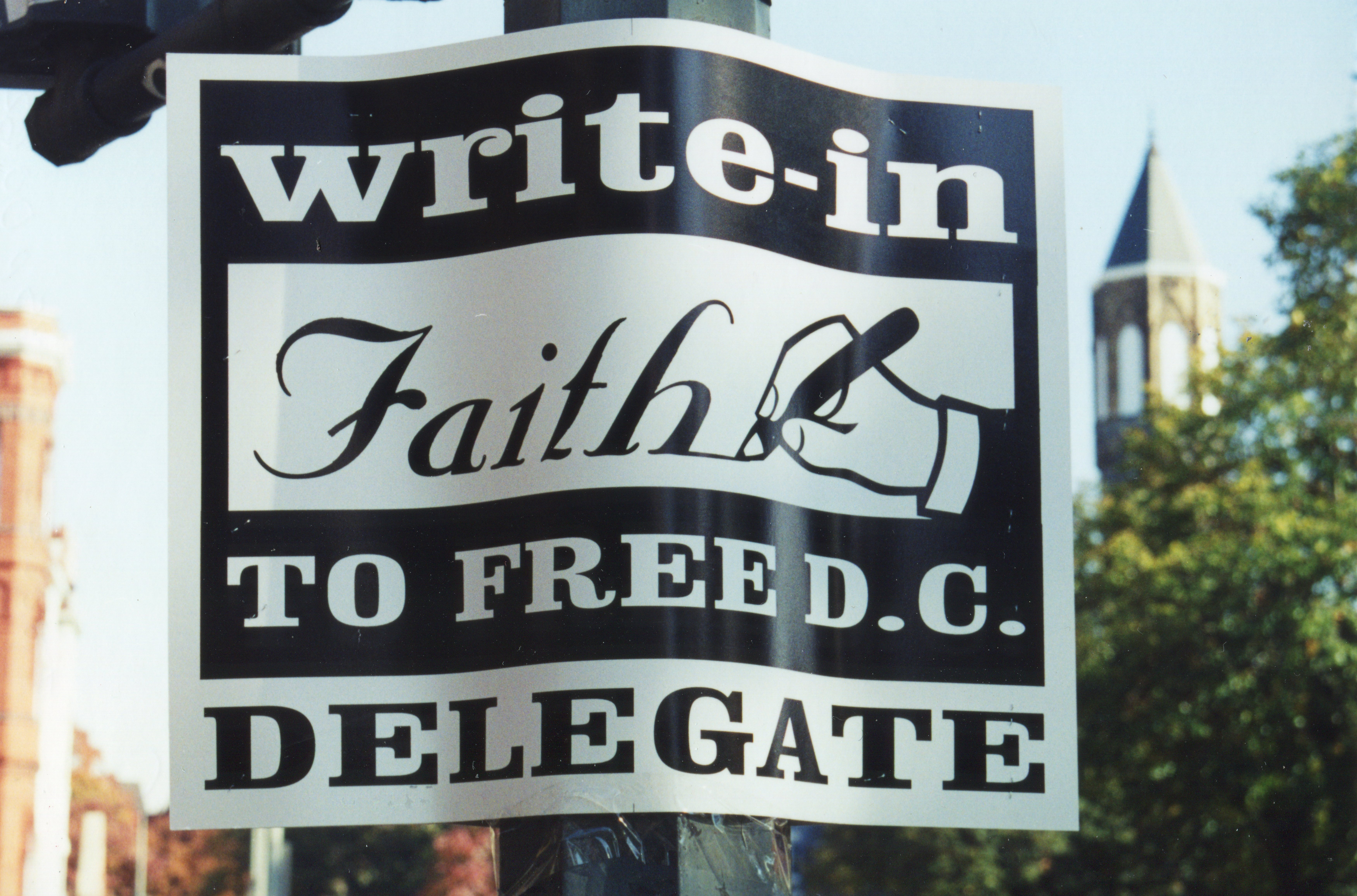
2000 campaign sign

She was an unsuccessful candidate for the D.C. Statehood Green Party nomination for Shadow Representative in 1992, receiving 34% of the vote to Paul McCallister's 52%, and was an independent candidate for Delegate to Congress from the District of Columbia in 1996, receiving 2,119 votes.

In 2010, Dane ran for mayor in the Statehood Green primary, winning with 40% of the vote in the face of only write-in opposition. In the general election, she received 1,476 votes. She ran for mayor again in 2014, winning the Statehood Green primary with 47%, again with only write-in opposition. In the general election, she received about one percent of the vote.

She was still performing a few nights a year for friends and at small benefits at the age of 90. Dane died at a nursing home in Washington on April 7, 2020, aged 96.
