= Let Me Entertain You (Gypsy song) =

Song from the musical Gypsy

"Let Me Entertain You" and "May We Entertain You?" are two songs from the musical Gypsy. The former is the more popular reprise of the latter. "May We" is performed by Baby June and Baby Louise, while "Let Me" is performed by Louise. The song was written by Jule Styne (music) and Stephen Sondheim (lyrics)

== Synopsis ==
The Register Citizen wrote, "Baby June (Morgan Perschy) and Baby Louise (Sofia Singer) crisscross the country, with June as the headliner dancing and singing 'Let Me Entertain You' while Louise – the future Gypsy – is just another backup dancer in the shadow cast by June's spotlight."

The Citizen also wrote, "The reprise of 'Let Me Entertain You' takes on new meaning as Louise – now billed as Gypsy Rose Lee – tantalizes male audiences while never actually taking off much more than a white glove." DC Theatre Scene added "this 'diehard' song shows her turning from a scared girl into an assured, star-class performer."

== Analysis ==
Creative Loafing analysed the evolution from "May We" to "Let Me":

Merman notwithstanding, the real cultural earthquake unleashed by Gypsy was the children's novelty song that sisters Baby June and Baby Louise sing at the start of the show in a vaudeville act under Mama Rose's tutelage, "May We Entertain You". When we reach the turning point of Act 2, June has eloped, vaudeville has died, and Mama Rose is so desperate that she's ready to violate her own ban against Louise degrading herself and performing burlesque. In a moment that echoes the great renaming episodes of scripture and myth from Abraham down to Robin Hood and Batman, Louise becomes Gypsy Rose Lee in the space of a wardrobe change. Doubling down on that old mythic transformation – this is Broadway, folks! – the sheet music for that old children's novelty song is still in the family's traveling trunk, suddenly resurrected as "Let Me Entertain You", the ultimate bump-and-grind anthem.

== Critical reception ==
Allmusic said, "'Let Me Entertain You' is the song that is invariably used to introduce anything having to do with the strip tease." Friedriskburg.com described it as a "renowned musical number." CurtainUp calls it a "sister act" and "scary," due to the "frightening stage mother." Artsnats deemed it a "striptease reprise." Stage and Cinema called it "the running anthem." New York Theatre Mag noted the repetitiveness of the song's use throughout the musical, writing that one might "cringe through the eighteenth reprise of 'Let Me Entertain You.'" NipperTown wrote "'Let Me Entertain You' is one of several show-stopping tunes from the show."
