= A Gift of Love =

Compilation album by Bette Midler
- Released: December 4, 2015
- Length: 75:07
- Labels: Warner, Rhino
- Producers: Arif Mardin, Chuck Plotkin, Paul A. Rothchild, Don Was, Marc Shaiman & Moogy Klingman

Bette Midler chronology
It's the Girls! (2014)	A Gift of Love (2015)	Hello, Dolly! (2017)

Professional ratings
Review scores
Source	Rating
AllMusic	4/5 stars

A Gift of Love is a 2015 compilation album of ballads recorded by Bette Midler from 1976 to 2014. It was released on December 4, 2015 and reached number 46 on the charts in Australia and number 25 in the UK.

== Track listing ==
No.	Title	Writer(s)	Length
1.	"Favorite Waste of Time" (from 1983 album No Frills)	Marshall Crenshaw	2:46
2.	"In This Life" (from 1995 album Bette of Roses)	Mike Reid, Allen Shamblin	4:12
3.	"The Gift of Love" (from 1990 album Some People's Lives)	Susanna Hoffs, Tom Kelly, Billy Steinberg	4:07
4.	"Bed of Roses" (from 1995 album Bette of Roses)	Bonnie Hayes	4:12
5.	"From a Distance" (from 1990 album Some People's Lives)	Julie Gold	4:38
6.	"Wind Beneath My Wings" (from 1988 album Beaches)	Larry Henley, Jeff Silbar	4:54
7.	"Come Rain or Come Shine" (from 1991 album For the Boys)	Harold Arlen, Johnny Mercer	3:15
8.	"The Rose" (from 1979 album The Rose)	Amanda McBroom	3:24
9.	"As Dreams Go By" (from 1995 album Bette of Roses)	Andy Hill, Peter Sinfield	5:10
10.	"It's Too Late" (from 1995 album Bette of Roses)	Bonnie Hayes, Bob Thiele Jr., Tonio K	4:42
11.	"All I Need to Know" (from 1983 album No Frills)	Barry Mann, Tom Snow, Cynthia Weil	4:08
12.	"Every Road Leads Back to You" (from 1991 album For the Boys)	Diane Warren	3:49
13.	"Shining Star" (from 2000 album Bette)	Leo Graham Jr., Paul Richmond	4:48
14.	"To Deserve You" (from 1995 album Bette of Roses)	Maria McKee	5:15
15.	"Night and Day" (from 1990 album Some People's Lives)	Billie Hughes, Roxanne Seeman	5:31
16.	"(Talk to Me of) Mendocino" (from deluxe edition of 2014 album It's the Girls!)	Kate McGarrigle	3:00
17.	"The Hunter Gets Captured by the Game" (from deluxe edition of 2014 album It's the Girls!)	Smokey Robinson	3:36
18.	"Let Me Just Follow Behind" (from 1976 album Songs for the New Depression)	Moogy Klingman	3:40
Total length:			75:07

== Charts ==
Chart (2016)	Peak position
Australian Albums (ARIA)	46
Irish Albums (IRMA)	74
Scottish Albums (Official Charts)	10
UK Albums (Official Charts)	25

== Certifications and sales ==
Region	Certification	Certified units/sales
United Kingdom (BPI)	Silver	60,000^{‡}
^{‡} Sales+streaming figures based on certification alone.
