= Gift of Love (disambiguation) =

Gift of Love is a 1992 album by Sissel.

Gift of Love or The Gift of Love may also refer to:

== Film and TV ==
- The Gift of Love, 1958 film with Lauren Bacall and Robert Stack
- Kadhal Parisu (English: Gift of Love), 1987 Tamil language film
- A Gift of Love (1972 film), a 1972 Philippines film with Nora Aunor
- The Gift of Love, 1978 made-for-TV movie with Marie Osmond
- The Gift of Love: A Christmas Story, 1983 American made-for-television drama film
- The Gift of Love (1994 film), 1994 TV film with Olivia Burnette
- A Gift of Love, 1999 TV film with Debbie Reynolds

=== TV episodes ===
- "The Gift of Love", 2017; Season 1, Episode 4; Are You the One: Second Chances
- "Gift of Love", 1998 episode of Born Free
- "A Gift of Love", 1965; Season 5, Episode 21; Dr. Kildare
- "Gift of Love", 1963; Season 4, Episode 22; Hawaiian Eye
- "A Gift of Love", 1968; Season 2, Episode 6; Gentle Ben

== Music ==
=== Albums ===
- The Gift of Love (Jerry Butler album), 1968
- Voice of Love, a 1996 album by Diana Ross album also released as Gift of Love
- A Gift of Love, 1993 album by Bill Tarmey
- A Gift of Love, 1998 album of songs and poems of Rumi by Deepak Chopra and Adam Plack
- A Christmas Gift of Love, 2002 album by Barry Manilow album
- Conception: The Gift of Love, 1979 album by American jazz vibraphonist Bobby Hutcherson
- Gift of Love, 1962 album by Jack Jones
- The Gift of Love, 2009 album by Phil Perry and Melba Moore
- A Gift of Love, 2015 greatest hits album by Bette Midler, 2015
- The Gift of Love, 2020 album by Qwabe Twins
- The Gift of Love (Jennifer Hudson album), 2024

=== Songs ===
- "Gift of Love", song by Hillsong Church from Songs for Communion
- "Gift of Love", single by David Ball from David Ball
- "The Gift of Love", song by Stars from There Is No Love in Fluorescent Light
- "The Gift of Love", a 1962 single by Jack Jones
- "The Gift of Love", a song by Bette Midler from Some People's Lives
- "The Gift of Love", song by Plácido Domingo from Christmas in Vienna
- "The Gift of Love", B-side of "Nine Times Out of Ten" by Teddy Pendergrass from It's Time for Love
- "The Gift of Love", song recorded by Sissel Kyrkjebø from Gift of Love

== Other ==
- A Gift of Love, permanent exhibit in Saint John Paul II National Shrine
