= Memories of You (album) =

Compilation album by Bette Midler
- Released: November 22, 2010
- Recorded: 1973–2006
- Length: 51:27
- Label: Rhino; Warner Music UK

Bette Midler chronology
Jackpot! The Best Bette (2008)	Memories of You (2010)	It's the Girls! (2014)

Memories of You is a collection of traditional pop standards recorded by American singer Bette Midler between 1973 and 2006. The compilation was released by Rhino Entertainment on November 22, 2010, in the United Kingdom and was certified silver by British Phonographic Industry (BPI).

== Critical reception ==
Professional ratings
Review scores
Source	Rating
Allmusic	4.5/5 stars
Daily Express	4/5 stars

AllMusic editor Jon O'Brien called Memories of You "the ideal chance to showcase her uncanny ability to interpret material from any period, and in the process provides an intriguing musical history lesson for those not fully acquainted with the '30s/'40s American classics."

== Track listing ==
1. "For All We Know"
  - From 1991 album For the Boys
2. "Come Rain or Come Shine"
  - From 1991 album For the Boys
3. "I Remember You"
  - From 1991 album For the Boys
4. "He Was Too Good to Me / Since You Stayed Here"
  - From 1990 album Some People's Lives
5. "The Folks Who Live on the Hill"
  - From 2005 album Bette Midler Sings the Peggy Lee Songbook
6. "What Are You Doing New Year's Eve"
  - From 2006 album Cool Yule
7. "He Needs Me"
  - From 2005 album Bette Midler Sings the Peggy Lee Songbook (Barnes and Noble edition)
8. "One for My Baby (and One More for the Road)"
  - Recorded and aired on The Tonight Show Starring Johnny Carson on May 21, 1992. Appears on the 1993 album Experience the Divine: Greatest Hits
9. "Mr. Wonderful"
  - From 2005 album Bette Midler Sings the Peggy Lee Songbook
10. "Drinking Again"
  - From 1973 album Bette Midler
11. "Memories of You"
  - From 2003 album Bette Midler Sings the Rosemary Clooney Songbook
12. "Dreamland"
  - From 1991 album For the Boys
13. "P.S. I Love You"
  - From 1991 album For the Boys
14. "Is That All There Is?"
  - From 2005 album Bette Midler Sings the Peggy Lee Songbook

== Charts ==
Weekly chart performance for Memories of You
Chart (2010)	Peak position
Irish Albums (IRMA)	63
Scottish Albums (OCC)	44
UK Albums (OCC)	45

== Certifications and sales ==
Certifications for Memories of You
Region	Certification	Certified units/sales
United Kingdom (BPI)	Silver	60,000^{^}
^{^} Shipments figures based on certification alone.
