= Night and Day (Bette Midler song) =

Single by Bette Midler

from the album Some People's Lives
- B-side: "From a Distance"
- Released: January 15, 1991
- Recorded: 1990
- Genre: Pop
- Length: 5:30
- Label: Atlantic
- Songwriters: Billie Hughes; Roxanne Seeman
- Producers: Arif Mardin, Marc Shaiman

Bette Midler singles chronology
| "From a Distance" (1990) | "Night and Day" (1991) | "The Gift of Love" (1991) |

Music video
- "Night And Day" on YouTube

"Night and Day" is a song by American singer and actress Bette Midler, written by Roxanne Seeman and Billie Hughes. It is the second single from her seventh album, Some People's Lives (1990), and is produced by Arif Mardin with Marc Shaiman as associate producer. "Night and Day" was arranged by Arif Mardin, Billie Hughes, and Joe Mardin. Jack Joseph Puig was the recording and mix engineer. It was also released as a single in Japan. The accompanying music video was directed by Irish music video and commercial director Meiert Avis.

"Night and Day" is included in A Gift of Love, the 2015 compilation album by Bette Midler focusing on her ballads. It is one of ten songs on the list of LA Times journalist James Reed in his story "On Bette Midler's birthday, 10 songs that remind us why we fell in love with her", printed December 1, 2016. It was also included on the Bette Midler collection "3 for One" released in Australia.

== Overview ==
Seeman and Hughes recorded a demo of the song performed by Billie Hughes. Seeman took the song demo to New York and dropped it off with a letter for Tunc Erim, A&R at Atlantic Records. A week later, Tunc Erim invited Seeman to lunch where he told her that Ahmet Ertegun and Doug Morris liked the song and wanted to show it to Mike Rutherford of Mike + The Mechanics. After the lunch, Seeman went to see Vicky Germaise in Arif Mardin's office at the Atlantic Recording Studios. Germaise asked Seeman if she had another copy and overnighted the demo to Arif Mardin who was in Los Angeles, producing Bette Midler's upcoming album.

"It's a song about how hard it is to get along and how wonderful it is when you finally can."

— Bette Midler

== Chart performance ==
"Night and Day" was released to adult contemporary radio and stayed on the Billboard AC chart for 15 weeks, peaking at number 15. The release to mainstream radio came later with "Night and Day" entering the Contemporary Hit Radio charts as Most Added and Significant Action.

As "Night and Day" was ascending the Billboard Hot 100, the Gulf War broke out, focusing attention back on the first single, "From A Distance". "Night and Day" remained on the Hot 100 for 7 weeks, peaking at 62.

== Critical reception ==
Walta Borawski of Gay Community News, Boston clarified "'Night and Day' is not the Cole Porter song" calling it "Roxanne Seeman and Billie Hughes' bright little tribute to the old "opposites attract" truism." A reviewer from Billboard praised the song comparing it to the first single as "...an equally appealing pop ballad. Midler's evocative performance works well within the song's haunting delicate keyboard arrangement." Gene Sandbloom from The Network Forty wrote, "'Night And Day' takes Bette back to a jazz vocal style, as she almost converses over the Enya-esque background. By second listen, the chorus takes on renewed strength, making this both a mood piece and Top 40 single at the same time."

== Charts ==
Chart performance for "Night and Day"
| Chart (1991) | Peak position |
|---|---|
| Australia (ARIA) | 84 |
| New Zealand (Recorded Music NZ) | 50 |
| US Billboard Hot 100 | 62 |
| US Adult Contemporary (Billboard) | 15 |
| US Cash Box Top 100 | 54 |

== Television performances ==
- Oprah Winfrey's "International Men's Show"
- VH1's Behind the Music - Bette Midler
- One Life to Live
- Another World
- Santa Barbara
- Passions

== Other versions ==
- Billie Hughes included a version of "Night and Day" on his Welcome to the Edge album which charted #1 in Japan.
- The Japanese hit duo Wink released a Japanese version of "Night and Day".
- Jasmine released a Mandarin version of "Night and Day".
- Cherrie Choi released a Cantonese version of "Night and Day".
