= For the Boys =

1991 film directed by Mark Rydell

- Promotional poster
- Directed by: Mark Rydell
- Screenplay by: Marshall Brickman; Neal Jimenez; Lindy Laub
- Story by: Neal Jimenez; Lindy Laub
- Produced by: Bette Midler; Bonnie Bruckheimer; Margaret South
- Starring: Bette Midler; James Caan; George Segal
- Cinematography: Stephen Goldblatt
- Edited by: Jerry Greenberg; Jere Huggins
- Music by: Dave Grusin
- Distributed by: 20th Century Fox
- Release date: November 22, 1991
- Running time: 138 minutes
- Country: United States
- Language: English
- Budget: $40 million
- Box office: $23.2 million

For the Boys is a 1991 American musical comedy-drama film that traces the life of Dixie Leonard, a 1940s actress/singer who teams up with Eddie Sparks, a famous performer, to entertain American troops.

The film was adapted by Marshall Brickman, Neal Jimenez, and Lindy Laub from a story by Jimenez and Laub. It was directed by Mark Rydell and the original music score was composed by Dave Grusin. It stars Bette Midler, James Caan, George Segal, Patrick O'Neal, Arye Gross, and Norman Fell. A then-unknown Vince Vaughn made his film debut as a cheering soldier in a crowd.

As in The Rose, Midler's first starring role and also a large budget quasi-biopic, the film is fiction. However, actress and singer Martha Raye believed that Midler's character was based on many widely known facts about her life and career with the USO and pursued legal action based on that assumption. After a protracted legal engagement, Raye ultimately lost the case. The Caan character was generally believed to be based on Bob Hope.

For her performance, Midler won a Golden Globe Award and was nominated for the Academy Award for Best Actress. The soundtrack features covers of many classic songs, including "Come Rain or Come Shine", "Baby, It's Cold Outside" by Frank Loesser, "P.S. I Love You", "I Remember You" and the Beatles' "In My Life". Five of the 13 songs have lyrics by Johnny Mercer. The soundtrack's first single, "Every Road Leads Back to You," was an original written by Diane Warren.

Despite a mixed critical reception and box office failure, the film was adapted for the musical stage in 2011 by Aaron Thielen and Terry James and debuted at the Marriott Theatre in Lincolnshire, Illinois.

== Plot ==
In the early 1990s, retired entertainer Dixie Leonard has a commitment to attend a Hollywood ceremony being televised live to honor her and her longtime show-biz partner Eddie Sparks. When a young man from the TV show comes to pick her up, Dixie balks and explains what brought Eddie and her together, as well as what drove them apart. The majority of the film is an extended flashback.

Dixie's story begins during World War II when she receives an offer to entertain the troops overseas as part of Eddie's act. Dixie is an instant hit with the boys in uniform, but Eddie wants her gone, ostensibly because he finds her kind of humor too coarse, but in actuality because she stole the show by topping his jokes. Dixie doesn't care for him much, either, but fellow entertainers and her joke-writer uncle Art persuade her to stay.

Eddie wins her over, particularly by reuniting Dixie with her soldier husband on stage. However, later in the war, Dixie's husband dies in battle.

Despite her distaste for Eddie, Dixie continues working with him back in the States, mostly to support herself and her son Danny. Eddie is married with daughters, yet he becomes a proud surrogate father to Danny.

As the Korean War breaks out, Eddie announces on stage that he and Dixie will be performing for the U.S. troops there, without having told Dixie of his plans first. In revenge, Dixie announces that Eddie made a $100,000 donation ($1,240,000 today) to the Red Cross. Reluctantly, she travels to Korea with him. On their way to the camp, they encounter a unit of soldiers that has been ambushed. Dixie cares for a wounded soldier but cannot save him: he is pronounced dead on arrival at the field hospital. Dixie and Eddie appear to spend the night together. At the Christmas dinner, a fight ensues after Art announces to everybody that Eddie has fired him for being a communist sympathizer.

In the meantime, Danny has grown up to be a soldier like his father and is deployed to Vietnam. At Art's suggestion, Dixie eventually agrees to perform there for Christmas with Eddie. On their way to the camp, the performers are warned of the camp possibly being attacked, because of which they are to be flown out immediately after their performance. Before going on stage, Dixie and Eddie meet Danny, who reveals to them the barbarity that is spreading among his comrades. The show begins with the performance of a dancer, who starts getting harassed by the soldiers, and only Eddie's intervention prevents the situation from getting out of control. Dixie comes on stage and makes some cynical remarks about the soldiers, then sings “In My Life”. While she is still on stage, the camp is attacked in a mortar barrage. Dixie and Eddie find shelter, but Danny is killed right in front of them; both mourn deeply for him.

Dixie has not forgiven Eddie for his part in all this, and they have another heated argument in the dressing room. Eddie goes out on stage alone. But, at the last minute, because he speaks of their joint loss in Vietnam, Dixie joins him on stage for one last song and dance, before appearing to accept their mutual love for one another.

== Cast ==
- Bette Midler as Dixie Leonard
- James Caan as Eddie Sparks
- George Segal as Art Silver
- Patrick O'Neal as Shephard
- Christopher Rydell as Danny Leonard
  - Brandon Call as teenage Danny Leonard
  - Jameson Rodgers as young Danny Leonard
- Arye Gross as Jeff Brooks, the young man who comes to escort Dixie
- Norman Fell as Sam Schiff
- Dori Brenner as Loretta, Dixie's friend on the road
- Rosemary Murphy as Luanna Trott, a journalist
- Bud Yorkin as Phil
- Jack Sheldon as Wally Fields
- Karen Martin as Victoria Lee, the dancer
- Shannon Wilcox as Margaret Sparks, Eddie's wife
- Michael Greene as Maj. Gen. Scott
- Melissa Manchester as Corrine
- Steven Kampmann as Stan Newman

== Reception ==
The film received mixed reviews from critics, holding a 44% rating on Rotten Tomatoes based on 16 reviews, with an average rating of 5/10. John Simon of the National Review called For the Boys "mindless".

Produced on a $40 million budget, For the Boys was a commercial disappointment upon its original release, returning just $23 million in box office receipts worldwide.

== Awards and nominations ==
Award	Category	Nominee(s)	Result
Academy Awards	Best Actress	Bette Midler	Nominated
Chicago Film Critics Association Awards	Best Actress	Bette Midler	Nominated
Golden Globe Awards	Best Actress in a Motion Picture – Musical or Comedy	Bette Midler	Won
Golden Globe Awards	Best Original Score – Motion Picture	Dave Grusin	Nominated

== Soundtrack ==
The soundtrack album is composed largely of popular standards from the era, although several were written after the time period in which the film takes place.

Track Listing Information based on the album's Liner Notes

1. "Billy-a-Dick"
  Performed by Bette Midler
  with Orchestra arranged & conducted by Marc Shaiman
  Music composed by Hoagy Carmichael
  Lyrics written by Paul Francis Webster
  Background Vocals: Patty Darcy
2. "Stuff Like That There"
  Performed by Bette Midler with Orchestra conducted by Billy May
  Written by Jay Livingston & Ray Evans
  Arranged by Billy May & Arif Mardin
3. "P.S. I Love You"
  Performed by Bette Midler
  Music composed by Gordon Jenkins
  Lyrics written by Johnny Mercer
  Rhythm arranged by Dave Grusin
  Strings arranged by Arif Mardin
4. "The Girl Friend of the Whirling Dervish"
  Orchestra arranged & conducted by Marc Shaiman
  Music composed by Harry Warren
  Lyrics written by Al Dubin and Johnny Mercer
  Background Vocals arranged by Marc Shaiman, Morgan Ames & Lorraine Feather
5. "I Remember You/Dixie's Dream"
  Performed by Bette Midler and James Caan
  Arranged by Marc Shaiman
  "I Remember You" Music composed by Victor Schertzinger
  "I Remember You" Lyrics written by Johnny Mercer
  "Dixie's Dream" Written by Marc Shaiman
6. "Baby, It's Cold Outside"
  Performed by Bette Midler and James Caan
  Written by Frank Loesser
  Rhythm arranged by Marc Shaiman
  Strings arranged by Arif Mardin
7. "Dreamland"
  Performed by Bette Midler
  Music composed and arranged by Dave Grusin
  Lyrics written by Alan and Marilyn Bergman
8. "Vickie and Mr. Valves"
  Trumpet Solo performed by Jack Sheldon
  Orchestra arranged & conducted by Marty Paich
  Written by Lenny Lacroix
9. "For All We Know"
  Performed by Bette Midler with Orchestra conducted by Ralph Burns
  Music composed by J. Fred Coots
  Lyrics written by Sam Lewis
10. "Come Rain or Come Shine"
  Performed by Bette Midler
  Music composed by Harold Arlen
  Lyrics written by Johnny Mercer
  Rhythm arranged by Marc Shaiman
  Strings and Woodwinds arranged by Arif Mardin
11. "In My Life"
  Performed by Bette Midler
  Written by John Lennon and Paul McCartney
  Music arranged by Robbie Buchanan
  Strings and Background Vocals arranged by Arif Mardin
  Guitar: Steve Lukather
  Music programmed by Robbie Buchanan, Joe Mardin & Eric Persing
12. "I Remember You"
  Performed by Bette Midler with Orchestra conducted by Arif Mardin
  Music composed by Victor Schertzinger
  Lyrics written by Johnny Mercer
  Background Vocals arranged by Arif Mardin
13. "Every Road Leads Back to You"
  Performed by Bette Midler
  Written by Diane Warren
  Arranged by Joe Mardin
  Drums: Jeff Porcaro
  Guitar: John Goux

Two Bette Midler singles were issued from the soundtrack, although neither performed particularly well on the U.S. singles charts. "Every Road Leads Back to You" peaked at No. 78 on the Billboard Hot 100 and No. 15 on the Adult Contemporary chart, while "In My Life" reached No. 20 on the Adult Contemporary chart while failing to register at all on the pop side.
