= Beaches (soundtrack) =

Beaches: Original Soundtrack Recording

Soundtrack album by Bette Midler
- Released: November 22, 1988
- Recorded: 1988
- Genres: Pop; adult contemporary
- Length: 33:54
- Label: Atlantic
- Producer: Arif Mardin

Bette Midler chronology
Just Hits (1987)	Beaches: Original Soundtrack Recording (1988)	Some People's Lives (1990)

Singles from Beaches: Original Soundtrack Recording
- 1. "Under the Boardwalk" Released: December 1988; 2. "Wind Beneath My Wings" Released: February 1989

Professional ratings
Review scores
Source	Rating
AllMusic	3/5 stars

Beaches: Original Soundtrack Recording is the soundtrack to the Academy Award-nominated 1988 film starring Bette Midler and Barbara Hershey. Midler performs most of the tracks on the album, released on the Atlantic Records label. The album also reunited her with producer Arif Mardin. It features one of Midler's best-known songs, the ballad "Wind Beneath My Wings", which was a number-one hit.

== Background ==
The original script merely indicated that "traditional music" was to be played at certain times. Marc Shaiman, Midler's longtime music arranger, served as music supervisor for the film, and the two of them worked together to determine what songs Midler could sing for the film. Shaiman was already a fan of "Wind Beneath My Wings" and suggested the song to Midler.

== Songs ==
The track that was chosen to promote both the movie and the album was not "Wind Beneath My Wings", but the song heard in the movie's opening scene and also the opening track on the album: Midler's cover of The Drifters' 1960s classic "Under the Boardwalk". That song alluded to the title of the movie and the place where the movie's main characters, rich girl Hillary Whitney (Barbara Hershey) and child performer Cecilia Carol "CC" Bloom (Midler) first meet. Midler's version of "Under the Boardwalk", released to tie in with the premiere in December 1988, peaked outside the Billboard Hot 100 chart and passed by mostly unnoticed, although it reached the Top 30 of the ARIA singles chart in Australia.

"Wind Beneath My Wings", which had been recorded by several other artists before Midler in the early 1980s, among them Sheena Easton, Roger Whittaker, Gary Morris, Perry Como, Gladys Knight & the Pips and Lou Rawls, was released as the second single in February 1989, following the box office success of the movie. The song instantly became a number-one hit on the US singles chart, reached number 2 on the Adult Contemporary chart, number 3 in the UK, number 1 in Australia and was a top 10 hit single in many other parts of the world. Midler's recording of the song was later awarded a platinum disc by the RIAA for sales exceeding one million copies in the US alone. It also won Grammys for Record of the Year and Song of the Year at the Grammy Awards of 1990, and remains Midler's signature tune to this day. The recording of the song appearing in the film is notably different from the one released on the soundtrack, and the movie also includes an orchestral version over the end credits.

The remainder of the soundtrack musically follows C.C. Bloom's rise to fame as an artist, from doing Cole Porter standards like "I've Still Got My Health" to moderately appreciative audiences in dive bars, appearing in burlesque shows singing about the supposed German inventor of the brassiere ("Otto Titsling", a song Midler herself had co-written and which had already appeared on her 1985 album Mud Will Be Flung Tonight), joining an experimental theater group ("Oh Industry"), to becoming a successful pop star ("I Know You by Heart", a duet with David Pack, originally recorded by Dolly Parton and Smokey Robinson in 1987) with the right to record material of her own choosing (Randy Newman's "I Think It's Going to Rain Today").

A recurring theme in the movie is Billy Hill's old swing standard "The Glory of Love", first made famous by Benny Goodman in the mid-1930s. In Beaches the song is first reluctantly sung as an upbeat showtune by a very young C.C. Bloom at an audition in the company of her overbearing stage mother. In the final scene the song is performed as a ballad by the character as an adult, and then in the context of the movie taking on an entirely different meaning.

The track "Baby Mine", originally from Walt Disney's 1941 movie Dumbo, was released in two versions with slightly different arrangements; one on the original vinyl album and another on the CD edition.

The version of "Oh Industry" on the soundtrack has a fade out ending, whereas the version in the film features an alternate cold ending.

The only track on the album not to involve Midler is "The Friendship Theme" from the movie's score, composed by Georges Delerue in his only work for a Garry Marshall film.

== Commercial performance ==
The Beaches soundtrack is the best-selling album of Midler's career to date, peaking at number 2 on the Billboard 200 albums chart, number 21 in the UK, number 1 in Australia and eventually achieving triple platinum status in the US for having sold more than three million copies.

== Track listing ==
Side A

1. "Under the Boardwalk" (Artie Resnick, Kenny Young) – 4:18 * Includes uncredited instrumental intro.
2. "Wind Beneath My Wings" (Larry Henley, Jeff Silbar) – 4:52
3. "I've Still Got My Health" (Cole Porter) – 1:32
4. "I Think It's Going to Rain Today" (Randy Newman) – 3:31
5. "Otto Titsling" (Bette Midler, Jerry Blatt, Charlene Seeger, Marc Shaiman) – 3:13

Side B

1. "I Know You by Heart" (Dean Pitchford, George Merrill, Shannon Rubicam) – 4:40 * Duet with David Pack
2. "The Glory of Love" (Billy Hill) – 3:16
3. "Baby Mine" (Ned Washington, Frank Churchill) – 2:27 * Note: CD includes alternate version.
4. "Oh Industry" (Midler, Wendy Waldman) – 4:06
5. "The Friendship Theme" (Georges Delerue) – 1:59 * Instrumental

== Personnel ==
Vocalists

- Bette Midler – lead vocals, backing vocals (1–9)
- Angela Cappelli – additional vocals
- Rachele Cappelli – additional vocals
- Gail Farrell – additional vocals
- Ula Hedwig – additional vocals
- Angie Jaree – additional vocals
- David Lasley – additional vocals
- Marcy Levy – additional vocals
- Melissa Mackay – additional vocals
- Arnold McCuller – additional vocals
- David Pack – lead vocals (6)
- Gene Merlino – additional vocals
- Joe Pizzulo – additional vocals
- Bob Tebow – additional vocals

Musicians

- Robbie Buchanan – keyboards, synthesizers, arrangements
- Claude Gaudette – acoustic piano, synthesizers, synthesizer programming, drums, percussion, other instruments
- Randy Kerber – acoustic piano, keyboards
- Robbie Kondor – synthesizers, arrangements
- Steve McNicholas – musician
- Jimmy Rowles – acoustic piano (3)
- Dann Huff – guitars
- Paul Jackson, Jr. – guitars
- Dean Parks – guitars
- Michael Thompson – guitars
- Abraham Laboriel – bass
- Neil Stubenhaus – bass
- Eric Van Essen – bass
- Vinnie Colaiuta – drums
- Luke Cresswell – drum programming
- Paul Leim – drums, percussion
- Joe Mardin – drums
- Carlos Vega – drums
- Gary Coleman – percussion
- Arif Mardin – arrangements
- Marc Shaiman – arrangements, music supervisor
- Georges Delerue – original scoring (10)
- Endre Granat – concertmaster
- Frank DeCaro – contractor

Production

- Arif Mardin – producer
- Teri Schwartz – executive producer
- Jack Joseph Puig – recording, remixing
- Joey Wolpert – recording
- Ian Eales – additional engineer
- Richard McKernan – additional engineer
- Michael O'Reilly – additional engineer
- Bill Schnee – additional engineer
- Bruce Wildstein – additional engineer
- Frank Wolf – additional engineer
- Ted Blaisdell – assistant engineer
- Ken Felton – assistant engineer
- Ellen Fitton – assistant engineer
- Rob Harvey – assistant engineer
- Wade Jaynes – assistant engineer
- Michael C. Ross – assistant
- Joe Schiff – assistant engineer
- Barton Stevens – assistant engineer
- Doug Sax – mastering

Studios

- Recorded at Schnee Studios (North Hollywood, CA); Ocean Way Recording and Conway Studios (Hollywood, CA); Studio 55 (Los Angeles, CA); Atlantic Studios (New York, NY).
- Mixed and Mastered at The Mastering Lab (Hollywood, CA).

== Charts ==
=== Weekly charts ===
Weekly chart performance for Beaches
Chart (1989–1995)	Peak position
Australian Albums (ARIA)	1
Canada Top Albums/CDs (RPM)	7
New Zealand Albums (RMNZ)	2
Scottish Albums (Official Charts)	97
UK Albums (Official Charts)	21
US Billboard 200	2
US Top 200 Albums (Cash Box)	3
European Albums (Eurotipsheet)	90

=== Year-end charts ===
1989 year-end chart performance for Beaches
Chart (1989)	Position
Australian Albums (ARIA)	8
Canada Top Albums/CDs (RPM)	18
New Zealand Albums (RMNZ)	22
US Billboard 200	14
US Top 50 Pop Albums (Cash Box)	13
US Top Soundtracks (Cash Box)	1

1990 year-end chart performance for Beaches
Chart (1990)	Position
Australian Albums (ARIA)	87
US Billboard 200	74

== Certifications ==
Certifications for Beaches
Region	Certification	Certified units/sales
Australia (ARIA)	4× Platinum	280,000^{^}
Canada (Music Canada)	2× Platinum	200,000^{^}
United Kingdom (BPI)	Gold	100,000^{^}
United States (RIAA)	3× Platinum	3,000,000^{^}
^{^} Shipments figures based on certification alone.
