= Otto Titzling =

Fictional inventor of the bra

Otto Titzling is a fictional character apocryphally described as the inventor of the brassière in the 1971 satire Bust-Up: The Uplifting Tale of Otto Titzling by New Zealand humorist Wallace Reyburn. The character's name is a pun on "a two-tit sling".

Following the book's publication, by Macdonald in London and by Prentice-Hall in the USA, the hoax name has appeared in the game Trivial Pursuit (fooled by the hoax, the gamemakers listed Otto Titzling as the "correct answer" to the question of who invented the brassière), on the TV show Hollywood Squares in the late 1980s (John Davidson's first two mispronunciations of the name had to be bleeped for broadcast), in the 1984 pornographic film Intimate Couples (in which Joanna [Jacqueline Lorians] reads the Trivial Pursuit card shortly before the climactic orgy scene), and in the comic strip Luann by Greg Evans.

With songwriters Charlene Seeger and Jerry Blatt and composer Marc Shaiman, Bette Midler wrote "Otto Titsling", which was first recorded on her 1985 live album Mud Will Be Flung Tonight; a studio recording was used in the 1988 movie Beaches. The song also references another Reyburn character, Philippe de Brassière, who stole Titzling's idea (which Otto had neglected to patent) and created his own undergarment. As noted by Midler, "The result of this swindle is pointedly clear: Do you buy a titsling or do you buy a brassiere?"

Peter Cook references Otto Titzling as the inventor of the brassiere during a Pete and Dud skit with Dudley Moore, in their West End stage show Beyond the Fringe, first broadcast on BBC2 in 1974. The same network used Titzling in practice questions sent to prospective teams of University Challenge.

A similar myth persists with Thomas Crapper, a plumber with an overstated reputation regarding the flushing lavatory, as fictionalized by Reyburn in Flushed With Pride: The Story of Thomas Crapper, though unlike Titzling, Thomas Crapper was a real person, albeit not the inventor.
