= Just the Hits =

Just the Hits may refer to:

- Just the Hits (compilation series), a 1999–2001 series of compilation albums released in New Zealand
- Just the Hits, a 2021 album by Elemeno P

== See also ==
- Just Hits, a 1987 album by Bette Midler
