= It's the Girls! =

Studio album by Bette Midler
- Released: November 4, 2014
- Studio: Capitol Studios (Hollywood, CA); Over at Marc & Scott's (New York, NY); The Marc Shaiman Institute (Los Angeles, CA); The Record Plant (Hollywood, CA); Westlake Recording Studios (Hollywood, CA)
- Length: 47:32 (standard edition)
- Label: Warner Bros.; Eastwest
- Producer: Marc Shaiman; Scott Riesett

Bette Midler chronology
Memories of You (2010)	It's the Girls! (2014)	A Gift of Love (2015)

Singles from It's the Girls!
- 1. "Be My Baby" / "It's the Girl" Released: November 24, 2014

It's the Girls! is the fourteenth studio album by American singer Bette Midler. It was released by Warner Bros. Records on November 4, 2014. Midler's first release with the label since Bette (2000), the album is a collection representing the music of the great girl groups of the past.

The album sold 40,000 copies in its first week of release in the United States, thus allowing it to reach number three on the Billboard 200, her highest position on the chart. This made Midler only the second female singer after Barbra Streisand to have top 10 albums in five consecutive decades. It's the Girls! also marked Midler's highest debut week sales ever and her second-highest position in the US after the Beaches soundtrack, released in 1988.

== Critical reception ==
Professional ratings
Aggregate scores
Source	Rating
Metacritic	72/100
Review scores
Source	Rating
AllMusic	3.5/5 stars
Cuepoint (Expert Witness)	A−
PopMatters	6/10 stars
Record Collector	3/5 stars
Rolling Stone	3.5/5 stars

AllMusic editor Matt Collar found that the album "sounds like a retrospective, a return to the cabaret and theatrical style of her early career. Working with veteran producers Marc Shaiman and Scott Riesett, Midler frames her resonant vocal chops with lush arrangements that, while reverential to the original recordings, certainly allow her to express her own personality on each song [...] These are brightly produced songs perfectly suited to Midler's vocal style, stage bravado, and cheeky sense of humor." Amy Rose from Rolling Stone, wrote that "Midler has a voice that’s rich enough to reanimate any pop standard [...] and the album’s spirit of femme camaraderie comes through in their powerhouse harmonies and jokey just-us-girls delivery." Stephen Holden, writing for The New York Times, felt that It's the Girls! "was "one of her best [...] That music, along with Motown, is in Ms. Midler and [producer] Mr. Shaiman’s bones, and their fit is as comfortable as ever [...] Midler’s brash, mouthy vocal persona is still capable of sounding playfully transgressive, at least by ’60s standards."

== Commercial performance ==
It's the Girls! debuted at number three on the US Billboard 200, selling 40,000 copies in its first week of release, ending November 9, 2014, according to Nielsen SoundScan. This made Midler only the second female singer after Barbra Streisand to have top 10 albums in five consecutive decades. The album also marked Midler's highest debut week sales ever and her second-highest position in the US after the Beaches soundtrack, which came in at number two in 1988.

== Track listing ==
All tracks produced by Marc Shaiman and Scott M. Riesett.

Standard edition
No.	Title	Writer(s)	Original artist	Length
1.	"Be My Baby"	Jeff Barry; Ellie Greenwich; Phil Spector	The Ronettes	3:10
2.	"One Fine Day"	Gerry Goffin; Carole King	The Chiffons	2:54
3.	"Bei Mir Bist du Schön"	Sammy Cahn; Saul Chaplin; Sholom Secunda	The Andrews Sisters	2:23
4.	"Baby It's You"	Burt Bacharach; Mack David; Barney Williams	The Shirelles	3:18
5.	"Tell Him"	Bert Russell	The Exciters	2:57
6.	"He's Sure the Boy I Love" (duet with Darlene Love)	Barry Mann; Cynthia Weil	The Crystals	2:54
7.	"Mr. Sandman"	Pat Ballard	The Chordettes	2:25
8.	"Come and Get These Memories"	Holland–Dozier–Holland	Martha and the Vandellas	4:14
9.	"Too Many Fish in the Sea"	Eddie Holland; Norman Whitfield	The Marvelettes	3:05
10.	"Teach Me Tonight"	Sammy Cahn; Gene de Paul	The DeCastro Sisters	3:30
11.	"Waterfalls"	Marqueze Etheridge; Lisa Lopes; Rico Wade; Ray Murray; Sleepy Brown	TLC	4:14
12.	"You Can't Hurry Love"	Holland–Dozier–Holland	The Supremes	3:07
13.	"Give Him a Great Big Kiss"	George "Shadow" Morton	The Shangri-Las	3:01
14.	"Will You Still Love Me Tomorrow"	Goffin; King	The Shirelles	3:35
15.	"It's the Girl"	Abel Baer; David Oppenheimer	Boswell Sisters	2:38

Target deluxe edition bonus tracks
No.	Title	Writer(s)	Original artist	Length
16.	"The Hunter Gets Captured by the Game"	Smokey Robinson	The Marvelettes	3:36
17.	"(Talk to Me of) Mendocino"	Kate McGarrigle	Kate and Anna McGarrigle	3:03
Total length:				54:11

== Charts ==
=== Weekly charts ===
Weekly chart performance for It's the Girls!
Chart (2014–15)	Peak position
Australian Albums (ARIA)	10
Austrian Albums (Ö3 Austria)	38
Belgian Albums (Ultratop Flanders)	161
Canadian Albums (Billboard)	24
German Albums (Offizielle Top 100)	62
Hungarian Albums (MAHASZ)	26
Irish Albums (IRMA)	17
Dutch Albums (Album Top 100)	64
Scottish Albums (OCC)	6
Swiss Albums (Schweizer Hitparade)	62
UK Albums (OCC)	6
US Billboard 200	3
US Digital Albums (Billboard)	5

=== Year-end charts ===
Year-end chart performance for It's the Girls!
Chart (2014)	Position
UK Albums (OCC)	37
Chart (2015)	Position
US Billboard 200	187

== Certifications ==
Certifications for It's the Girls!
Region	Certification	Certified units/sales
United Kingdom (BPI)	Gold	100,000^{*}
^{*} Sales figures based on certification alone.
