= Storybook Children (Daybreak) =

- French picture sleeve

Single by Bette Midler

from the album Broken Blossom
- B-side: "Empty Bed Blues"
- Released: December 1977
- Genre: Pop; MOR
- Length: 3:40
- Label: Atlantic
- Songwriter(s): David Pomeranz; Spencer Proffer
- Producer(s): Brooks Arthur

Bette Midler singles chronology
"You're Moving Out Today" (1977)	"Storybook Children (Daybreak)" (1977)	"Buckets of Rain" (1978)

"Storybook Children (Daybreak)" is a song by American singer Bette Midler, recorded for her fourth studio album Broken Blossom (1977). It was written by David Pomeranz and Spencer Proffer. Released as the lead single from the album, the song reached number 57 on the Billboard Hot 100.

== Track listing ==
7" single
A. "Storybook Children (Daybreak)" – 3:40
B. "Empty Bed Blues" (J. C. Johnson) – 3:19

== Charts ==
Chart performance for "Storybook Children (Daybreak)"
Chart (1978)	Peak position
Canada (RPM Top Singles)	56
Canada (RPM Adult Oriented Playlist)	39
US Billboard Hot 100	57
US Easy Listening (Billboard)	37
US Cash Box Top 100	66
US Top Singles (Record World)	61
