= Wallace Reyburn =

New Zealand-born humorist author

Wallace Macdonald Reyburn OBE (3 July 1913 – 20 June 2001) was a New Zealand-born humourist author and rugby writer who was responsible for a number of well-known urban legends, including the widespread belief that the flush toilet was invented by Thomas Crapper and that the brassière was invented by Otto Titzling. Reyburn wrote several books, some humorous and some not, including on rugby and on the Canadian armed forces, as well as humorous yarns of pseudo-historical nonsense. Reyburn was also the editor of the Canadian magazine New Liberty before returning to the United Kingdom in 1950. Shortly before his death, he appeared in the Modern Marvels episode titled "Plumbing: The Arteries of Civilization", which was the 40th episode of the 7th season and aired 17 December 2000.

== Books ==
- "Some of it was Fun" (1949)
- Flushed With Pride: The Story of Thomas Crapper (1969)
- Bust-Up: The Uplifting Tale of Otto Titzling and the Development of the Bra (1971)
- "The Inferior Sex" (1972)
