= List of awards and nominations received by Marc Shaiman =

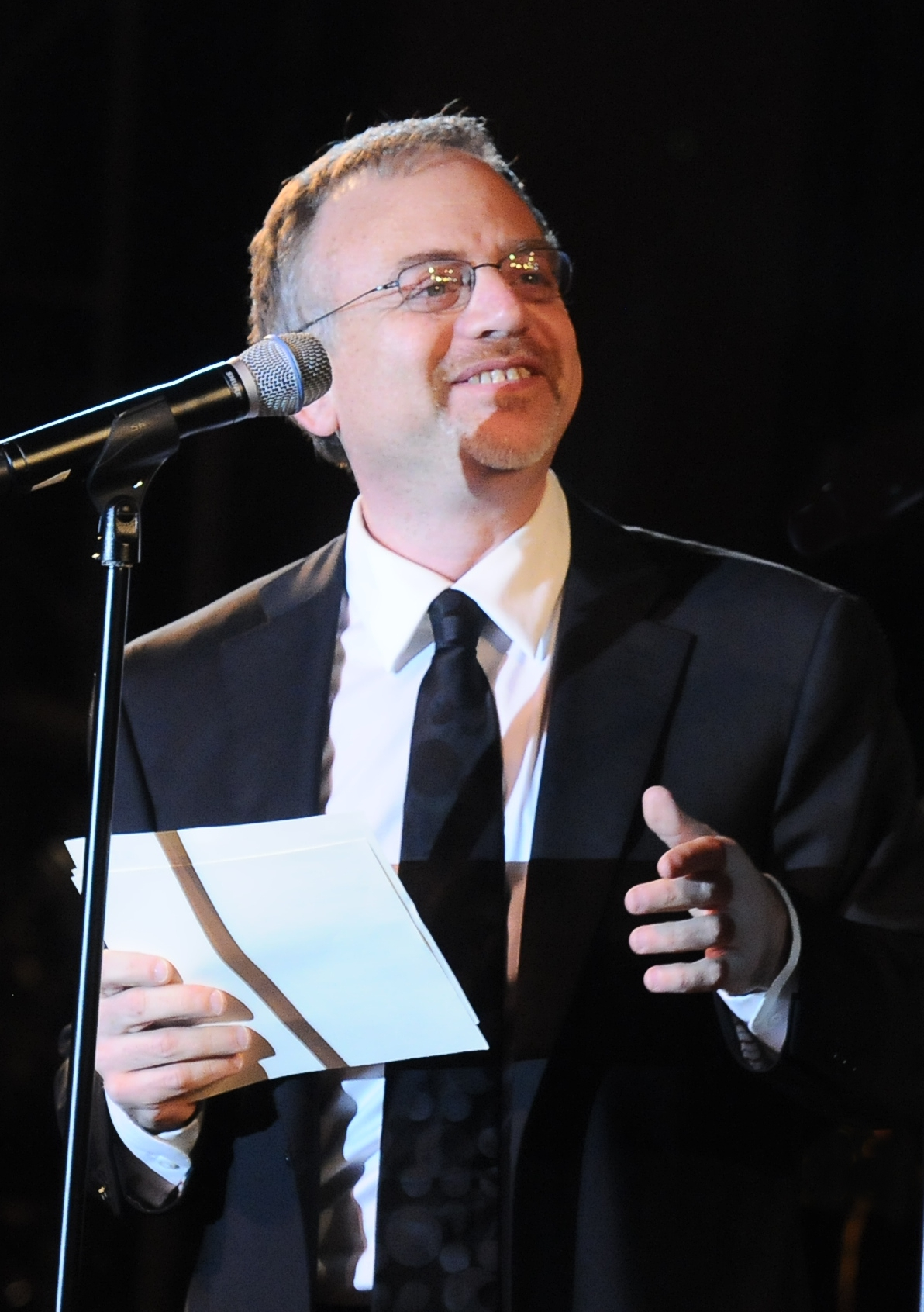
Marc Shaiman in 2011

Marc Shaiman is an American composer and lyricist for films, television, and theatre.

He has received numerous accolades including two Emmy Awards, two Grammy Awards, and a Tony Award as well as nominations for seven Academy Awards, two BAFTA Awards, and two Golden Globe Awards. He received the Hollywood Film Award for Outstanding Contribution to Music and Film in 2002.

== Major associations ==
=== Academy Award ===
| Year | Category | Nominated work | Result | Ref. |
|---|---|---|---|---|
| 1994 | Best Original Song | "A Wink and a Smile", Sleepless in Seattle | Nominated | |
| 1996 | Best Musical or Comedy Score | The American President | Nominated | |
| 1997 | Best Musical or Comedy Score | The First Wives Club | Nominated | |
| 1999 | Best Musical or Comedy Score | Patch Adams | Nominated | |
| 2000 | Best Original Song | "Blame Canada", South Park: Bigger, Longer & Uncut | Nominated | |
| 2019 | Best Original Score | Mary Poppins Returns | Nominated | |
| 2019 | Best Original Song | "The Place Where Lost Things Go", Mary Poppins Returns | Nominated | |

=== BAFTA Award ===
| Year | Category | Nominated work | Result | Ref. |
British Academy Film Awards
| 1994 | Best Original Music | "A Wink and a Smile", Sleepless in Seattle | Nominated | |
| 2019 | Best Original Music | Mary Poppins Returns | Nominated | |

=== Emmy Awards ===
| Year | Category | Nominated work | Result | Ref. |
Primetime Emmy Awards
| 1987 | Outstanding Writing for a Variety or Music Program | Saturday Night Live | Nominated | |
| 1991 | Outstanding Achievement in Music Direction | 63rd Academy Awards | Nominated | |
| 1992 | Outstanding Writing for a Variety or Music Program | 64th Academy Awards | Won | |
| 2004 | Outstanding Music Direction | 76th Academy Awards | Nominated | |
| 2010 | Outstanding Writing for a Variety Special | 82nd Academy Awards | Nominated | |
| 2010 | Outstanding Music Direction | 82nd Academy Awards | Nominated | |
| 2012 | Outstanding Writing for a Variety Special | 84th Academy Awards | Nominated | |
| 2012 | Outstanding Music Composition for a Series (Original Dramatic Score) | Smash: Publicity | Nominated | |
| 2012 | Outstanding Original Music and Lyrics | "Let Me Be Your Star", Smash: Pilot | Nominated | |
| 2013 | Outstanding Original Music and Lyrics | "Hang the Moon", Smash: The Parents | Nominated | |
| 2015 | Outstanding Writing for a Variety Special | Saturday Night Live 40th Anniversary Special | Nominated | |
| 2021 | Outstanding Original Music and Lyrics | "The End Titles", Soundtrack of Our Lives | Nominated | |
| 2024 | Outstanding Music Composition for a Documentary Series or Special (Original Dramatic Score) | Albert Brooks: Defending My Life | Nominated | |
| 2024 | Outstanding Original Music and Lyrics | "Which Of The Pickwick Triplets Did It", Only Murders in the Building: Sitzprobe | Won | |

=== Golden Globe Award ===
| Year | Category | Nominated work | Result | Ref. |
|---|---|---|---|---|
| 2017 | Best Original Song | "The Star", The Star | Nominated | |
| 2018 | Best Original Score | Mary Poppins Returns | Nominated | |

=== Grammy Awards ===
| Year | Category | Nominated work | Result | Ref. |
|---|---|---|---|---|
| 1990 | Best Arrangement, Instrumental and Vocals | "It Had To Be You" | Nominated | |
| 1991 | Best Arrangement, Instrumental and Vocals | "Recipe For Love" | Nominated | |
| 2003 | Best Musical Theatre Album | Hairspray | Won | |
| 2008 | Best Compilation Soundtrack for Visual Media | Hairspray | Nominated | |
| 2013 | Best Song Written for Visual Media | "Let Me Be Your Star", Smash | Nominated | |
| 2020 | Best Score Soundtrack for Visual Media | Mary Poppins Returns | Nominated | |
| 2024 | Best Musical Theatre Album | Some Like It Hot | Won | |

=== Tony Award ===
| Year | Category | Nominated work | Result | Ref. |
|---|---|---|---|---|
| 2003 | Best Original Score | Hairspray | Won | |
| 2011 | Best Orchestrations | Catch Me If You Can | Nominated | |
| 2023 | Best Original Score | Some Like it Hot | Nominated | |

== Miscellaneous awards ==
=== Chicago Film Critics Association ===
- 1999 – Best Original Song – "Blame Canada", South Park: Bigger, Longer, Uncut (winner)

=== Critics' Choice Movie Awards ===
- 2018 – Best Original Score – Mary Poppins Returns (nominee)

=== Hollywood Film Awards ===
- 2002 – Outstanding Contribution to Music and Film (winner)

=== Hollywood Music in Media Awards ===
- 2023 – Career Achievement Award (winner)

=== Los Angeles Film Critics Association ===
- 1999 – Best Original Song – "Blame Canada", South Park: Bigger, Longer, Uncut (winner)

=== Satellite Awards ===
- 2007 – Best Original Song – "Come So Far", Hairspray (nominee)

=== Writers Guild of America Awards ===
- 2016 – Comedy/Variety Specials – Saturday Night Live 40th Anniversary Special (nominee)
- 2022 – Comedy/Variety Specials – 75th Tony Awards (nominee)
