= For the Boys (soundtrack) =

Soundtrack album by Bette Midler
- Released: November 12, 1991
- Recorded: 1991
- Genre: Vocal
- Length: 37:06
- Label: Atlantic
- Producers: Arif Mardin; Dave Grusin; Joe Mardin; Marc Shaiman

Bette Midler chronology
Some People's Lives (1990)	For the Boys (soundtrack) (1991)	Experience the Divine: Greatest Hits (1993)

Singles from For the Boys
- 1. "Every Road Leads Back to You"; 2. "In My Life"

For the Boys: Music from the Motion Picture is the soundtrack to the feature film of the same name starring Bette Midler and James Caan, released on the Atlantic Records label in 1991.

In the movie Midler and Caan play the USO entertainers Dixie Leonard and Eddie Sparks who travel and perform together through World War II, the Korean War, and the Vietnam War and the soundtrack mainly consists of period music from the songbooks of Hoagy Carmichael, Ray Evans, Johnny Mercer, Harold Arlen, and Frank Loesser, including jazz standards and evergreens like "P.S. I Love You", "Stuff Like That There", "Come Rain or Come Shine", and Leonard and Sparks' signature tune "I Remember You". A few of the tracks performed by Midler and Caan were originals composed especially for the movie. "Dixie's Dream" was written by Midler's longtime collaborator Marc Shaiman; "Dreamland" by Alan and Marilyn Bergman and co-producer Dave Grusin; Grusin also wrote the Golden Globe nominated original score.

For the Boys was promoted by the Diane Warren-penned ballad "Every Road Leads Back To You" which became a Top 20 hit on the US adult contemporary chart, peaking at #15. The second single was Midler's interpretation of The Beatles "In My Life", in the movie performed by Dixie Leonard as she entertains the U.S. troops during the Vietnam War. "In My Life" also reached #20 on the adult contemporary chart and later made its way onto Midler's greatest hits collection Experience the Divine.

The For the Boys album reached #22 on the U.S. album chart, and was later certified Gold by the RIAA, and #75 in the UK.

== Critical reception ==
Professional ratings
Review scores
Source	Rating
AllMusic	3/5 stars
Chicago Tribune	3/4 stars

The reviewer of Billboard wrote that the "thoroughly satisfying album proves that Midler's unique voice shines brightest when balanced by grandly orchestral and brass swing-jazz arrangements." Cash Box magazine noted that "this is an album you might want to have even if you haven't seen the film."

== Track listing ==
All tracks performed by Bette Midler unless otherwise noted

1. "Billy-A-Dick" (Hoagy Carmichael, Paul Francis Webster) - 1:35
2. "Stuff Like That There" (Ray Evans, Jay Livingston) - 2:50
3. "P.S. I Love You" (Gordon Jenkins, Johnny Mercer) - 3:33
4. "The Girlfriend of the Whirling Dervish" (Al Dubin, Johnny Mercer, Harry Warren) - 1:16
  - Performed by the cast
5. "I Remember You" / "Dixie's Dream" (Johnny Mercer, Victor Schertzinger) / (Marc Shaiman) - 2:21
  - Performed by Bette Midler and James Caan
6. "Baby, It's Cold Outside" (Frank Loesser) - 1:29
  - Performed by Bette Midler and James Caan
7. "Dreamland" (Alan Bergman, Marilyn Bergman, Don Grusin) - 3:16
8. "Vickie and Mr. Valves" (Lenny LaCroix) - 2:29
  - Performed by the cast, trumpet solo by Jack Sheldon
9. "For All We Know" (J. Fred Coots, Sam M. Lewis) - 4:00
10. "Come Rain or Come Shine" (Harold Arlen, Johnny Mercer) - 3:30
11. "In My Life" (John Lennon, Paul McCartney) - 3:26
12. "I Remember You" (Johnny Mercer, Victor Schertzinger) - 3:34
13. "Every Road Leads Back to You" (Diane Warren) - 3:47

== Personnel ==
- Bette Midler - lead vocals, backing vocals
- James Caan - lead vocals
- Melissa Manchester - backing vocals
- Morgan Ames - backing vocals
- Carmen Twillie - backing vocals
- Eugene VanBuren - backing vocals
- Randy Crenshaw - backing vocals
- Patty d'Arcy - backing vocals
- John West - backing vocals
- Kevin Dorsey - backing vocals
- Lorraine Feather - backing vocals
- Don Shelton - backing vocals
- Jo Ann Harris - backing vocals
- Jon Joyce - backing vocals
- David Lasley - backing vocals
- Arnold McCuller - backing vocals
- Alvin Stoller - drums
- Jeff Porcaro - drums
- Frank Capp - drums
- Vinnie Colaiuta - drums
- Harvey Mason - drums
- Chuck Berghofer - bass guitar
- Chuck Domanico - bass
- Dennis Budimir - guitar
- John Goux - guitar
- Steve Lukather - guitar
- Robbie Buchanan - keyboards, programming
- Marc Shaiman - keyboards
- Dave Grusin - keyboards
- Randy Kerber - keyboards
- Michael Lang - keyboards
- Claude Gaudette - synthesizer, keyboards
- Joe Mardin - synthesizer, keyboards, programming
- Eric Persing - programming
- Jack Sheldon - trumpet
- Stuart Canin - concert master
- Gerald Vinci - concert master

== Production ==
- Arif Mardin - record producer, musical arranger, string arrangements, woodwind arrangements
- Dave Grusin - producer, rhythm arrangements
- Joe Mardin - producer, arranger
- Marc Shaiman - arranger, conductor, producer, vocal arrangement
- Joel Sill - executive producer
- Artie Kane - conductor
- Ralph Burns - arranger, conductor
- Marty Paich - arranger, conductor
- Billy May - arranger, conductor
- Robbie Buchanan - rhythm arrangements
- Morgan Ames - vocal arrangements
- Lorraine Feather - vocal arrangements
- Jack Joseph Puig - engineer
- Joey Wolpert - engineer
- Bob Schaper - engineer
- Don Murray - engineer, mixing
- Michael O'Reilly - engineer, mixing
- Ray Blair - assistant engineer
- Brett Swain - assistant engineer
- Eddie Sexton - assistant engineer
- Eric Rudd - assistant engineer
- Marnie Riley - assistant engineer
- Mark Guilbeault - assistant engineer
- Charles Paakkari - assistant engineer
- Doug Sax - mastering
- Sandy DeCrescent - music contractor
- Lisa Maldonado - production coordination
- Recorded at Capitol Studios, Studio 55, Oceanway Recording, and Conway Recording Studios, Los Angeles, California.

== Charts ==
=== Weekly charts ===
Weekly chart performance for For the Boys
Chart (1991–1992)	Peak position
Australian Albums (ARIA)	44
Austrian Albums (Ö3 Austria)	34
Canada Top Albums/CDs (RPM)	28
Japanese Albums (Oricon)	52
UK Albums (Official Charts)	75
US Billboard 200	22
US Top 200 Pop Albums (Cash Box)	17

=== Year-end charts ===
Year-end chart performance for For the Boys
Chart (1992)	Position
US Top Soundtrack Albums (Billboard)	8

== Certifications and sales ==
Certifications for For the Boys
Region	Certification	Certified units/sales
Canada (Music Canada)	Gold	50,000^{^}
United States (RIAA)	Gold	500,000^{^}
^{^} Shipments figures based on certification alone.
