= The Best of Bette (1978 album) =

Greatest hits album by Bette Midler
- Released: 1978
- Recorded: 1972, 1973, 1976, 1977
- Genre: Vocal
- Length: 51:13
- Label: Atlantic

Bette Midler chronology
Broken Blossom (1977)	The Best of Bette (1978)	Thighs and Whispers (1979)

Singles from The Best of Bette
- 1. "Buckets of Rain" Released: 1978

The Best of Bette is the first compilation album by American female vocalist Bette Midler, released in 1978. This greatest hits album was issued in the UK, Continental Europe, Scandinavia and Australia to coincide with Midler's first world tour. Later editions released in 1979 also came with a free poster promoting her then upcoming movie The Rose. The Best of Bette, confusingly released with near identical cover art to 1973's Bette Midler, featured songs from Midler's first four studio albums with the addition of one track from 1977's Live at Last, the studio recording "You're Moving Out Today". The version included on The Best of Bette is the rare single mix which features an extra verse that is not found on the Live at Last album or on many of the single releases worldwide.

While other hits compilations followed in both Australia and New Zealand in the 1980s, such as the 1981 version of The Best of Bette on the K-tel label and 1987's Just Hits, Midler's first best of collection issued in the US was 1993's Experience the Divine.

The Best of Bette including the rare single mix of "You're Moving Out Today" was issued on CD in Australia only in 1987.

== Track listing ==
Side A

1. "Friends" (Mark Klingman, Buzzy Linhart) - 2:49
  - From 1972 album The Divine Miss M
2. "In the Mood" (Joe Garland, Andy Razaf) - 2:37
  - From 1973 album Bette Midler
3. "Superstar" (Bonnie Bramlett, Leon Russell) - 5:00
  - From 1972 album The Divine Miss M
4. "Say Goodbye to Hollywood" (Billy Joel) - 3:02
  - From 1977 album Broken Blossom
5. "Do You Want to Dance?" (Bobby Freeman) - 2:56
  - From 1972 album The Divine Miss M
6. "Buckets of Rain" (Bob Dylan) - 4:00
  - From 1976 album Songs for the New Depression
7. "Boogie Woogie Bugle Boy" (mono album version) (Don Raye, Hughie Prince) - 2:26
  - From 1972 album The Divine Miss M
8. "You're Moving Out Today" (Single Mix) (Bette Midler, Carole Bayer Sager, Bruce Roberts) - 3:18
  - Original version appears on 1977 album Live at Last

Side B

1. "Delta Dawn" (Larry Collins, Alex Harvey) - 5:16
  - From 1972 album The Divine Miss M
2. "Uptown"/"Don't Say Nothin' Bad (About My Baby)"/"Da Doo Ron Ron" (Jeff Barry, Gerry Goffin, Ellie Greenwich, Carole King, Barry Mann, Phil Spector, Cynthia Weil) - 3:22
  - From 1973 album Bette Midler
3. "Hello In There" (John Prine) - 4:15
  - From 1972 album The Divine Miss M
4. "(Your Love Keeps Lifting Me) Higher and Higher" (Chevis, Jackson, Miner, Smith) - 4:08
  - From 1973 album Bette Midler
5. "La Vie En Rose" (Mack David, Louiguy, Edith Piaf) - 2:59
  - From 1977 album Broken Blossom
6. "I Shall Be Released" (Bob Dylan) - 4:55
  - From 1973 album Bette Midler

== Personnel and production ==
- Aaron Russo - compilation producer
- Roger Holt - compilation producer

== Charts ==
Chart (1978)	Peak position
Australia (Kent Music Report)	18
Swedish Albums (Sverigetopplistan)	32

== Certifications ==
Region	Certification	Certified units/sales
Australia (ARIA)	Platinum	50,000^{^}
^{^} Shipments figures based on certification alone.
