= Just Hits =

Greatest hits album by Bette Midler
- Released: 1987
- Recorded: 1972–1983
- Genre: Vocal
- Length: 62:20
- Label: K-Tel

Bette Midler chronology
Mud Will Be Flung Tonight (1985)	Just Hits (1987)	Beaches (1988)

Just Hits is a compilation album by American singer Bette Midler, released on the Atlantic Records label in Australia and New Zealand in 1987. The album was the third greatest hits compilation with Midler to be released in Australia, following 1978's The Best of Bette and a second release with the same title on the K-tel label in 1981.

The eighteen track Just Hits includes two titles from Midler's then most recent studio album No Frills (1983), the Rolling Stones cover "Beast of Burden" and "Is It Love", but mainly focuses on material from her 1972 debut The Divine Miss M and repertoire standards like "Friends", "Boogie Woogie Bugle Boy", "Do You Wanna Dance", "Leader of The Pack" and "Delta Dawn" and the 1980 soundtrack The Rose and songs like "When A Man Loves A Woman", "Stay With Me" and the title track "The Rose". The compilation also, somewhat unusually, includes the last sixty seconds of the Phil Spector medley ""Uptown"/"Don't Say Nothin' Bad (About My Baby)"/"Da Doo Ron Ron" from the 1973 album Bette Midler and consequently only "Da Doo Ron Ron". The rare single version of the 1977 track "You're Moving Out Today" also makes its third appearance on this compilation.

The picture used for the cover of Just Hits is in fact the very same as the K-Tel version of The Best of Bette which shows Midler in concert, taken from the movie The Rose.

The first Bette Midler greatest hits compilation to be released worldwide, including the US and Canada, was 1993's Experience the Divine.

== Track listings ==
Side A

1. "Beast of Burden" (Mick Jagger, Keith Richards) - 3:48
  - From 1983 album No Frills
2. "Boogie Woogie Bugle Boy" (Don Raye, Hughie Prince) - 2:26
  - From 1972 album The Divine Miss M
3. "Say Goodbye to Hollywood" (Billy Joel) - 3:02
  - From 1977 album Broken Blossom
4. "Let Me Call You Sweetheart" (Live) (Beth Slater Whitson, Leo Friedman) - 1:30
  - From 1980 album The Rose
5. "The Rose" (Amanda McBroom) - 3:40
  - From 1980 album The Rose
6. "When a Man Loves a Woman" (Live) (Calvin Lewis, Andrew Wright) - 4:42
  - From 1980 album The Rose
7. "Do You Wanna Dance?" (Bobby Freeman) - 2:56
  - From 1972 album The Divine Miss M
8. "In the Mood" (Joe Garland, Andy Razaf) - 2:37
  - From 1973 album Bette Midler
9. "Da Doo Ron Ron" (Fade-in) (Phil Spector, Ellie Greenwich, Jeff Barry) - 1:00
  - Note: one minute excerpt from the medley "Uptown"/"Don't Say Nothin' Bad (About My Baby)"/"Da Doo Ron Ron" from 1973 album Bette Midler
10. "Is It Love" (Nick Gilder, Jimmy McCulloch) - 4:43
  - From 1983 album No Frills

Side B

1. "You're Moving Out Today" (Single version) (Bette Midler, Carole Bayer Sager, Bruce Roberts) - 3:18
  - Original version appears on 1977 album Live at Last
2. "Friends" (Mark Klingman, Buzzy Linhart) - 2:49
  - From 1972 album The Divine Miss M
3. "Delta Dawn" (Alex Harvey, Larry Collins) - 5:16
  - From 1972 album The Divine Miss M
4. "Chapel of Love" (Jeff Barry, Ellie Greenwich, Phil Spector) - 2:25
  - From 1972 album The Divine Miss M
5. "Superstar" (Leon Russell, Bonnie Bramlett) - 5:09
  - From 1972 album The Divine Miss M
6. "Stay with Me" (Live) (Jerry Ragovoy, George David Weiss) - 5:00
  - From 1980 album The Rose
7. "Leader of the Pack" (Jeff Barry, Ellie Greenwich, George Moton) - 3:41
  - From 1972 album The Divine Miss M
8. "(Your Love Keeps Lifting Me) Higher and Higher" (Gary Lee Jackson) - 4:08
  - From 1973 album Bette Midler

=== Charts ===
Weekly chart performance for Just Hits
Chart (1987)	Peak position
Australian Albums (Kent Music Report)	97
