= Cherrie Choi =

Hong Kong singer

- 蔡立兒
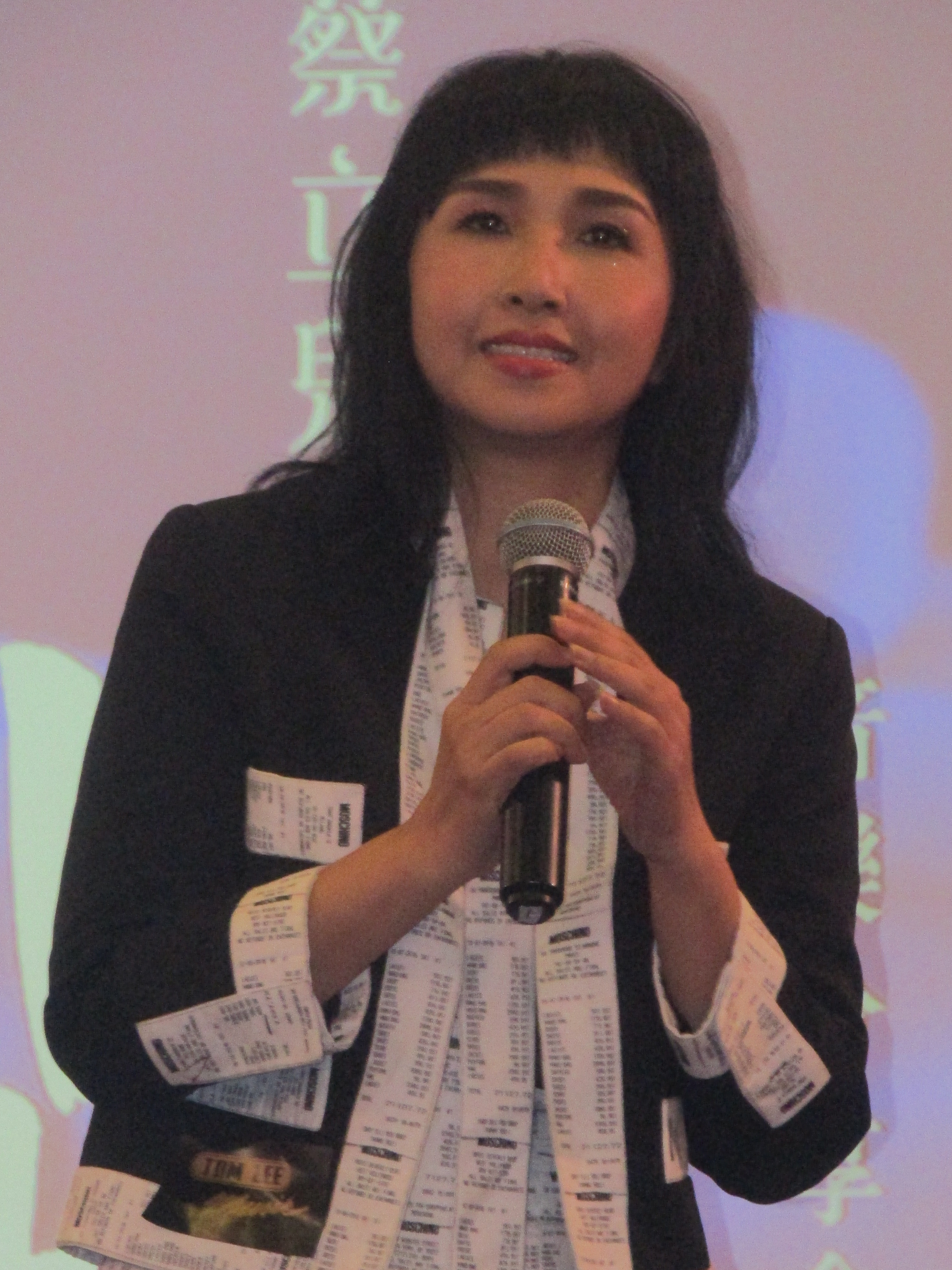
- Born: 7 September 1972 (age 53); Hong Kong
- Education: Ho Man Tin Government Secondary School
- Occupations: Singer; Actress
- Musical career
- Genres: Pop; Cantopop
- Labels: Warner Music Group

Chinese name
- Traditional Chinese: 蔡立兒
- Simplified Chinese: 蔡立儿
Transcriptions
Standard Mandarin
- Hanyu Pinyin: Cài Lì Ér
Yue: Cantonese
- Jyutping: Coi^{3} Lap^{6} Ji^{4}

Cherrie Choi (Chinese: 蔡立兒; born 7 September 1972), formerly known as Cai Li, is a Hong Kong singer best known for "Zhu Fu Ni", "Jue Lian", "Zen Me", "Xiang Gui Jia De Nv Hai" and "Conversation" (collaborated with George Lam).

== Early life and education ==
Choi grew up in a tenement building on Fuk Wa Street in Sham Shui Po, Kowloon, in Hong Kong. She attended Ho Man Tin Government Secondary School. While still in school she performed at a lounge with Stephanie Che and Fat Ma. She signed with Warner Music Group in 1986.

In 1989, she applied for the Hong Kong Secondary School Examination.

== Career ==
In 1987, she participated in the 3rd Asia-Canton Union Singing Contest with the song "Betrayal". In 1988, she debuted with the song "How". She released the album Hope produced by Lin Shi followed by the albums Incredible and Lover of June with the songs "Endless Love", "Close Your Eyes", and "A Covenant of Life and Death". With George Lam she released the song "Dialogue".

In 1990, she released the single "Close Your Eyes" which reached number one on the Ultimate Song Chart remained number one for two weeks. In the same year, she played one of the leading roles in the TV series "Love Beats".

At the end of 1992, she left Warner Records and signed with TVB, where she was the host of Jade Music Station with Au Hailun, Zhou Ying, and Liu Wenjuan.

In 2008, Cai Lier and Ouyang Dexun joined aTV Music) and participated in the show Tribute to Hong Kong Music Industry 50 Years Anniversary). She began using her real name Cai Li.

In 2017, she appeared in the TV show "Cantopop At 50".

In an interview in December 2017, Cai Li talked about her experience entering the music industry explaining that she sang "Saving All My Love for You" at a gathering of her parents and friends where an employee from Warner Records was there. She signed with Warner Records at the age of fifteen, and released her first album a year later.

In 2018, following "Cantopop At 50", a group of singers in the late 1980s and early 1990s formed the "Classic Alumni Association". On July 15, she and a group of singers from the "Classic Alumni Association" participated in "Love Enguang Classic Golden Melody Concert" charity concert.

== Discography ==
=== Albums ===
- 希望 (Hope) (1988)
- Bu De Liao (1989)
- 每一分爱 (Mei Yi Fen Ai) (1989)
- Close Your Eyes (Best 13 songs) (1990)
- Say U Love Me (1991)
- Lover of June (1992)
- Once Upon A Time…(Best of album) (1993)
- Legend Series of Warner Music –Gigi Lai, Cherrie Choi (1999)
- 响 I Am Here (2016)

=== Notable album appearances ===
- Millennium Greatest Hits, Vol. 2, various artists

== Television series ==
- War of the Couple (1993)
- Untraceable Evidence (1997)
- Armed Reaction (1998)
- Come Home Love: Lo And Behold (2019)
