= Thomas Crapper =

British businessman, plumber (died 1910)

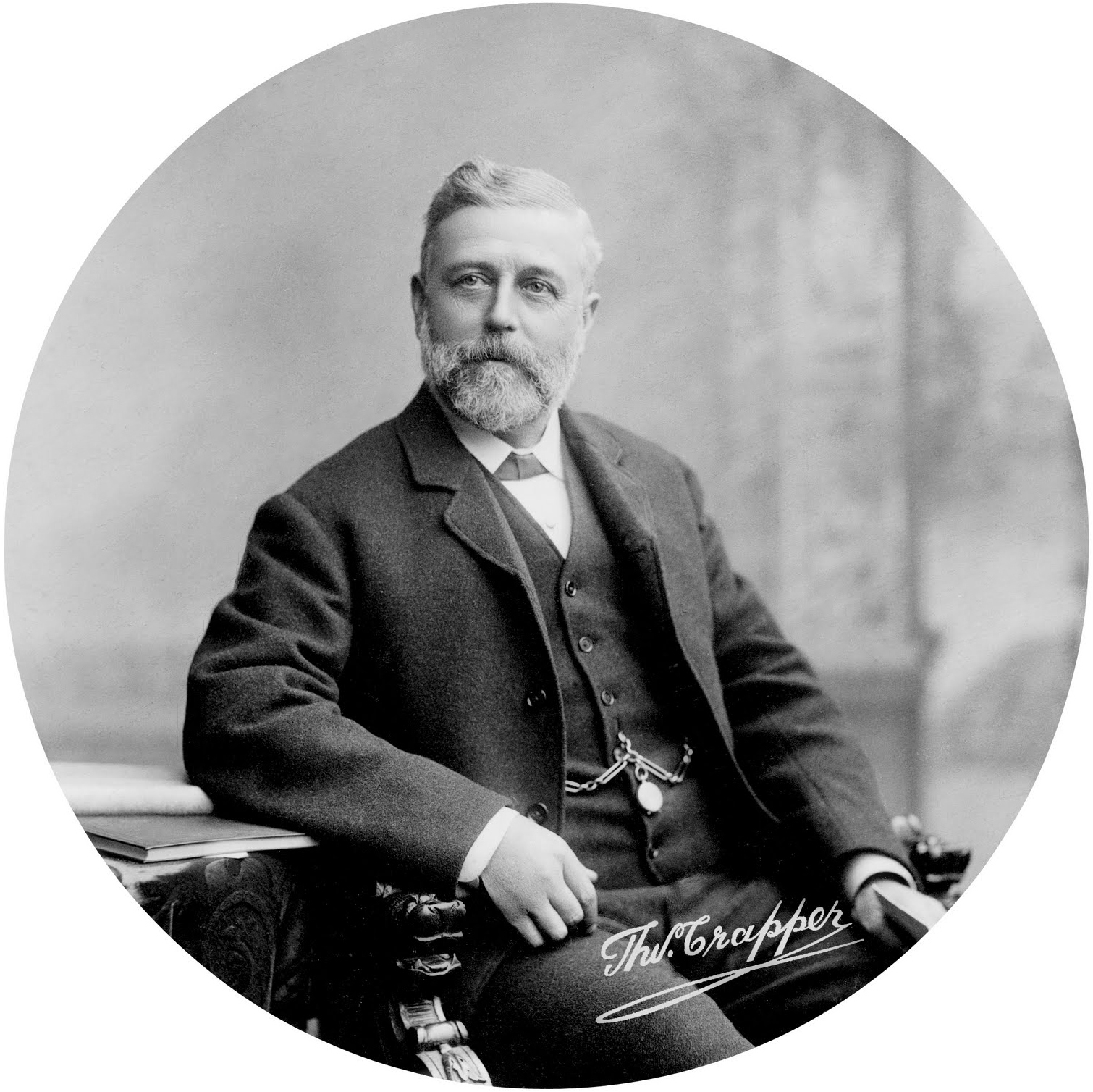
- Born: Thorne, Yorkshire, England
- Baptised: 28 September 1836
- Died: 27 January 1910 (aged 73); Anerley, Bromley, England
- Occupations: Plumber, businessman
- Spouse: Maria Green

Thomas Crapper (baptised 28 September 1836 – 27 January 1910) was an English plumber and businessman. He founded Thomas Crapper & Co in London, a plumbing equipment company. His notability with regard to toilets has often been overstated, mostly due to the publication in 1969 of a tongue-in-cheek biography by New Zealand satirist Wallace Reyburn.

Crapper held nine patents, three of them for water closet improvements such as the floating ballcock. He improved the S-bend plumbing trap in 1880 by inventing the U-bend. The firm's lavatorial equipment was manufactured at premises in nearby Marlborough Road (now Draycott Avenue). The company owned the world's first bath, toilet and sink showroom in King's Road. Crapper was noted for the quality of his products and received several royal warrants.

Manhole covers with Crapper's company's name on them in Westminster Abbey have become one of London's minor tourist attractions.

== Life ==
Thomas Crapper was born in Thorne, West Riding of Yorkshire, in 1836; the exact date is unknown, but he was baptised on 28 September 1836. His father, Charles, was a sailor. In 1853, he was apprenticed to his brother George, a master plumber in Chelsea, and thereafter spent three years as a journeyman plumber.

In 1861 Crapper set himself up as a sanitary engineer with his own brass foundry and workshops in nearby Marlborough Road.

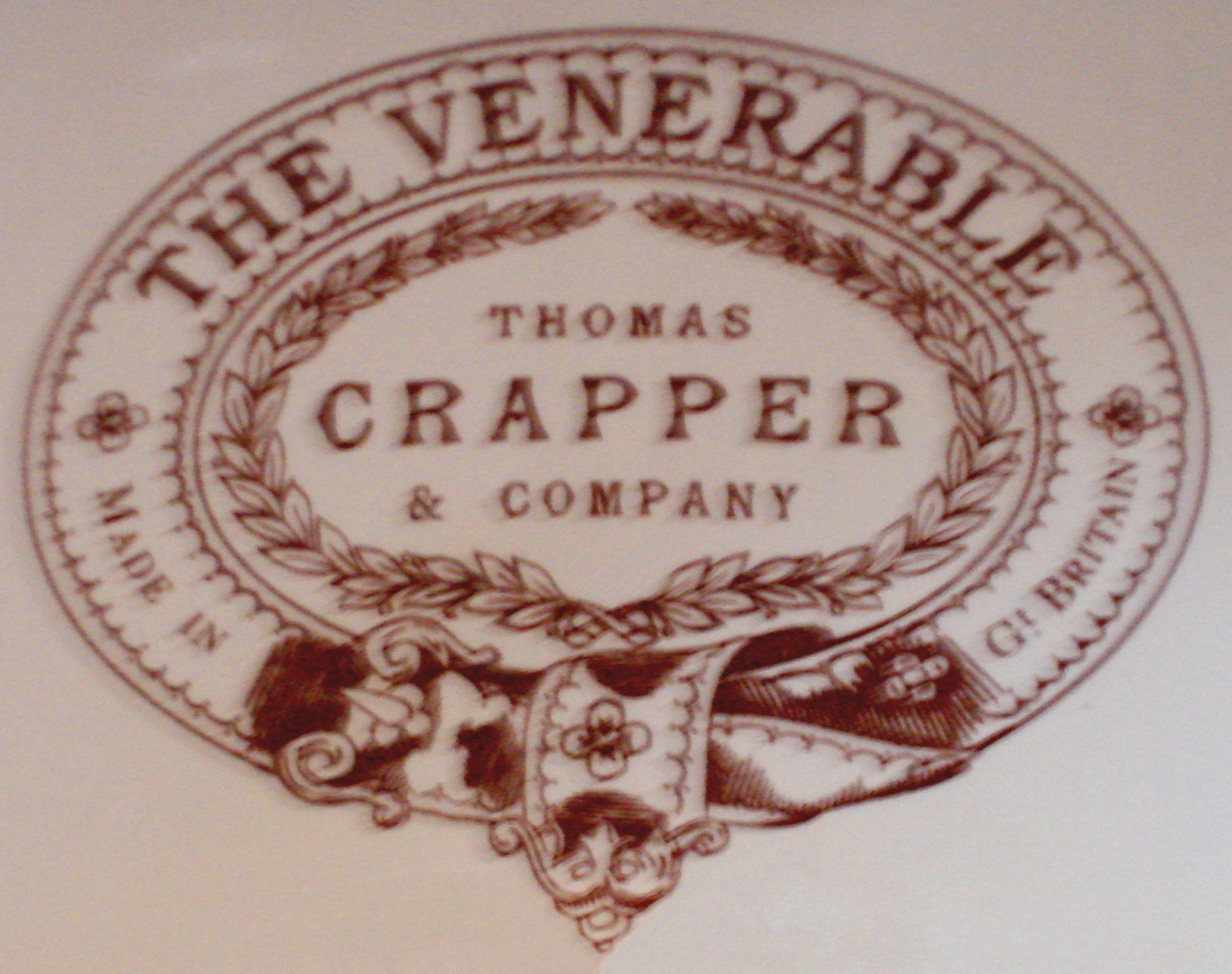
Thomas Crapper branding on one of his company's toilets

In the 1880s Prince Albert (later Edward VII) purchased his country seat of Sandringham House in Norfolk and asked Thomas Crapper & Co. to supply the plumbing, including thirty lavatories with cedarwood seats and enclosures, thus giving Crapper his first royal warrant. The firm received further warrants from Edward as king and from George V, both as Prince of Wales and as king.

In 1904, Crapper retired, passing the firm to his nephew George and his business partner Robert Marr Wharam. Crapper lived at 12 Thornsett Road, Anerley, for the last six years of his life and died on 27 January 1910 due to bowel cancer. He was buried in the nearby Elmers End Cemetery.

== Posthumous fate of the Crapper company ==
In 1966 the Crapper company was sold by then-owner Robert G. Wharam (son of Robert Marr Wharam) upon his retirement to its rival John Bolding & Sons. Bolding went into liquidation in 1969. The company fell out of use until it was acquired by Simon Kirby, a historian and collector of antique bathroom fittings, who relaunched the company in Stratford-upon-Avon, producing authentic reproductions of Crapper's original Victorian bathroom fittings.

== Achievements ==
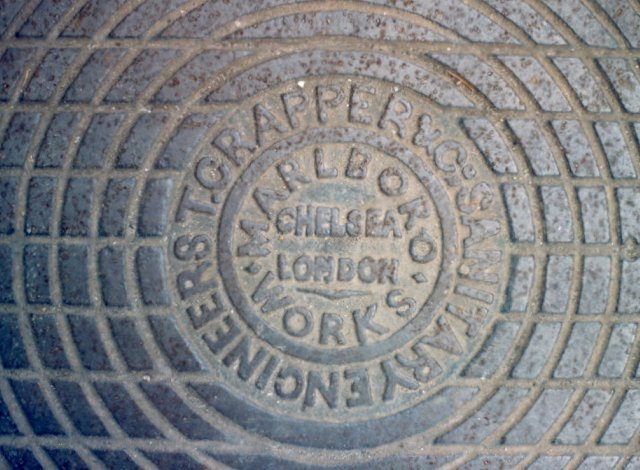
Manhole cover, inscribed "T Crapper & Co Sanitary Engineers Marlboro Works Chelsea London"

As the first man to set up public showrooms for displaying sanitary ware, Crapper became known as an advocate of sanitary plumbing, popularising the notion of installation inside people's homes. He also helped refine and develop improvements to existing plumbing and sanitary fittings. As a part of his business he maintained a foundry and metal shop, which enabled him to try out new designs and develop more efficient plumbing solutions.

Crapper improved the S-bend trap in 1880. The new U-bend plumbing trap was a significant improvement on the "S" as it could not jam, and unlike the S-bend, it did not have a tendency to dry out and did not need an overflow. The BBC nominated the S-bend as one of the 50 Things That (have) Made the Modern Economy.

Crapper held nine patents, three of them for water closet improvements such as the floating ballcock, but none for the flush toilet itself.

Crapper's advertisements implied the siphonic flush was his invention. One such advertisement read, "Crapper's Valveless Water Waste Preventer (Patent #4,990) One movable part only", even though patent 4,990 (for a minor improvement to the water waste preventer) was not his, but that of Albert Giblin in 1898. However, Crapper's nephew, George, did improve the siphon mechanism by which the water flow starts. A patent for this development was awarded in 1897.

== Origin of the word "crap" ==
It has often been claimed in popular culture that the vulgar slang term for human bodily waste, crap, originated with Thomas Crapper because of his association with lavatories. A common version of this story is that American servicemen stationed in England during World War I saw his name on cisterns and used it as Army slang, i.e., "I'm going to the crapper".

The word crap is actually of Middle English origin and predates its application to bodily waste. Its most likely etymological origin is a combination of two older words: the Dutch krappen (to pluck off, cut off, or separate) and the Old French crappe (siftings, waste or rejected matter, from the medieval Latin crappa). In English, it was used to refer to chaff and also to weeds or other rubbish. Its first recorded application to bodily waste, according to the Oxford English Dictionary, appeared in 1846, 10 years after Crapper was born, under a reference to a crapping ken, or a privy, where ken means a house.
