= The Gift of Love (Jerry Butler album) =

Compilation album by Jerry Butler
- Released: 1968
- Label: Sunset Records

The Gift of Love is a 1968 compilation album by American soul singer-songwriter Jerry Butler on Sunset Records. The title track had already been issued as a single by The Impressions in October 1958. Having by 1968 racked up a number of charting singles and become known as a solo artist, Sunset reissued this collection of singles from their back catalogue.

== Track listing ==
1. The Gift Of Love – Jerry Butler 2:45 - recorded 1958
2. Teardrops From My Eyes – Rudolph Toombs 2:30 - originally recorded 1960
3. Give Me Your Love - Jerry Butler, Richard Brooks 2:35
4. Butterfly – Jerry Butler 2:30
5. The Lights Went Out – Brook Benton, Clyde Otis 2:15
6. September Song – Kurt Weil, Maxwell Anderson 4:25
7. Don't Take Your Love From Me – Henry Nemo 2:15
8. Come Back, My Love – Clyde Otis, Roy Hamilton 2:35
9. If You Let Me – Whelock Alex Bessom 2:15
10. I Was Wrong – Jerry Butler 2:40
