= Broken Blossom =

Studio album by Bette Midler
- Released: November 17, 1977
- Recorded: 1977
- Studios: Record Plant (Los Angeles, California); Studio 55 (Los Angeles, California)
- Genre: Vocal
- Length: 37:44
- Label: Atlantic
- Producer: Brooks Arthur

Bette Midler chronology
Live at Last (1977)	Broken Blossom (1977)	The Best of Bette (1978)

Singles from Broken Blossom
- 1. "Storybook Children (Daybreak)" Released: December 1977; 2. "Paradise" Released: 1978

Broken Blossom is the fourth studio album by American singer Bette Midler, her second album release in 1977 and her fifth on the Atlantic Records label. Similar to Midler's three previous studio albums, Broken Blossom includes songs from a wide variety of genres, ranging from Edith Piaf's signature tune "La vie en rose", Phil Spector-esque covers of Billy Joel's "Say Goodbye to Hollywood" and Harry Nilsson's "Paradise" and hard rock like Sammy Hagar's "Red", to a jazzy duet with Tom Waits, "I Never Talk to Strangers", and a rendition of "A Dream Is a Wish Your Heart Makes", originally from Walt Disney's 1950 film version of Cinderella. The album reached No. 51 on Billboard's album chart.

The album was released on CD for the first time in 1993. A remastered version of the album was released by Atlantic Records/Warner Music in 1995.

== Critical reception ==
Professional ratings
Review scores
Source	Rating
AllMusic	4/5 stars
Christgau's Record Guide	C
The Rolling Stone Album Guide	2/5 stars

The Globe and Mail concluded that the majority of the songs are "either underperformed or blasted out of all proportion by producer Brooks Arthur, whose quite blatant steal of Phil Spector's production style represents a serious threat to Midler's sincerity."

== Track listing ==
Side A:

1. "Make Yourself Comfortable" (Bob Merrill) - 3:59
2. "You Don't Know Me" (Eddy Arnold, Cindy Walker) - 3:39
3. "Say Goodbye to Hollywood" (Billy Joel) - 3:02
4. "I Never Talk to Strangers" (duet with Tom Waits) (Tom Waits) - 3:39
5. "Storybook Children (Daybreak)" (David Pomeranz, Spencer Proffer) - 3:40
6. "Red" (John Carter, Sammy Hagar) - 3:17

Side B:

1. "Empty Bed Blues" (J. C. Johnson) - 3:19
2. "A Dream Is a Wish Your Heart Makes" (Mack David, Al Hoffman, Jerry Livingston) - 3:09
3. "Paradise" (Perry Botkin, Jr., Gil Garfield, Harry Nilsson) - 4:15
4. "Yellow Beach Umbrella" (Craig Doerge, Judy Henske) - 4:24
5. "La Vie en Rose" (Mack David, Louiguy, Edith Piaf) - 2:59

== Personnel ==
- Bette Midler – lead vocals all tracks, background vocals tracks A3, B3, all background vocals track B4
- Craig Doerge – keyboards tracks A1, B4, piano track A2
- Russ Kunkel – drums tracks A1, A2
- Alan Estes – congas track A1, percussion tracks A5, B3, B4
- Lee Ritenour – electric guitar tracks A1, A2, A3, B3
- Leland Sklar – bass guitar tracks A1, A2
- Jim Horn – baritone sax track A1
- Donny Gerrard – background vocals track A1
- Brian Russell – background vocals tracks A1, A3
- Chuck Higgins – background vocals track A1
- Jimmie Haskell – arranger strings & horns track A2
- Brenda Russell – background vocals tracks A2, A3, A5
- Clydie King – background vocals tracks A2, A3, A5
- Diane Brooks – background vocals tracks A2, A3, A5
- Bobby Rozario – musical arranger track A3
- Artie Butler – piano tracks A3, A5 B3, arranger tracks A5, B2, B3, arranger strings and horns track B4, arranger strings track B5
- Jim Keltner – drums tracks A3, A5, A6, B1, B3, B4
- Jack Jennings – percussion instruments track A3
- Chuck Rainey – bass guitar track A3
- David Latman – background vocals track A3
- Bob Alcivar – arranger track A4
- Tom Waits – lead vocals, piano track A4
- Frank Vicari – tenor saxophone solo track A4
- Jim Hughart – bass guitar tracks A4, A5, B5
- Shelly Manne – drums track A4
- Thom Rotella – guitar tracks A5, B3
- Ira Newborn – arranger tracks A6, B1, guitars track A6
- Don Randi – keyboards track A6, organ track B1
- Fred Tackett – guitar tracks A6, B1
- Jerry Scheff – bass guitar tracks A6, B1
- Steve Porcaro – synthesizers track A6
- John Barnes (American musician) – piano track B1
- David Walker – electric guitar track B1
- Steve Douglas – saxophone track B1
- Plas Johnson – saxophone track B1
- Don Menza – saxophone track B1
- Marshall Royal – saxophone track B1
- Gene Goe – trumpet track B1
- Don Rader – trumpet track B1
- Bobby Shaw – trumpet track B1
- Lew McCreary – bones track B1
- Bill Watrous – bones track B1
- David Hungate – bass guitar track B3
- Ellie Greenwich – background vocals track B3
- Mikie Harris – background vocals track B3
- Howard Roberts – guitar and ukulele track B4
- Max Bennett – bass guitar track B4
- Mike Melvoin – arranger & piano track B5

== Production ==
- Brooks Arthur - record producer, sound engineer
- Bob Merritt - sound engineer
- David Latman - assistant sound engineer
- Ivy Skoff - production coordinator
- Bones Howe - producer track A4 for Mr. Bones Production
- Bob Defrin - cover design
- George Hurrell - photography:
- Primary recording location: The Record Plant, Los Angeles. Additional recording at Studio 55, Los Angeles.

== Charts ==
Chart performance for Broken Blossom
Chart (1978)	Peak position
Australian Albums (Kent Music Report)	47
Canada Top Albums/CDs (RPM)	46
US Billboard 200	51
US Top 100 Albums (Cash Box)	47
US The Album Chart (Record World)	76
