= In My Life =

1965 song by The Beatles

- Northern Songs sheet music cover

Song by the Beatles

from the album Rubber Soul
- Released: 3 December 1965
- Recorded: 18 and 22 October 1965
- Studio: EMI, London
- Genre: Pop rock, baroque pop
- Length: 2:28
- Label: Parlophone
- Songwriter: Lennon–McCartney
- Producer: George Martin

Audio sample
- file; help

"In My Life" is a song by the English rock band the Beatles, released on their 1965 studio album Rubber Soul. Credited to the Lennon–McCartney songwriting partnership, the song is one of only a few in which there is dispute over the primary author; John Lennon wrote the lyrics, but he and Paul McCartney later disagreed over who wrote the melody. George Martin contributed the piano solo bridge.

According to Lennon, "In My Life" was his "first real major piece of work," diverging lyrically from the more simplistic romance typical of pre-Rubber Soul Beatles songs, and instead presenting a biographical meditation on his adolescent relationships.

In 2000, Mojo named "In My Life" the best song of all time. Rolling Stone ranked it number 23 on its 2004 list of "The 500 Greatest Songs of All Time", and number 98 on the 2021 revised list, as well as fifth on its list of the Beatles' "100 Greatest Songs".

== Lyrics ==
In a 1980 interview, Lennon referred to this song as his "first real major piece of work" because it was the first time he had written about his own life. According to Lennon, the song's origins can be traced to English journalist Kenneth Allsop's remark that Lennon should write songs about his childhood. Afterwards, Lennon wrote a song in the form of a long poem reminiscing on those years. The original lyrics were based on a bus route he used to take in Liverpool, naming various sites seen along the way, including Penny Lane and Strawberry Field.

Lennon later thought the original lyrics were "ridiculous", calling it "the most boring sort of 'What I Did on My Holidays Bus Trip' song". He reworked the words and replaced the specific memories with a generalised meditation on his past. Few lines of the original version remained in the finished song. According to Lennon's friend and biographer Peter Shotton, the lines "Some [friends] are dead and some are living/In my life I've loved them all" referred to himself and Stuart Sutcliffe (who died in 1962).

== Music ==
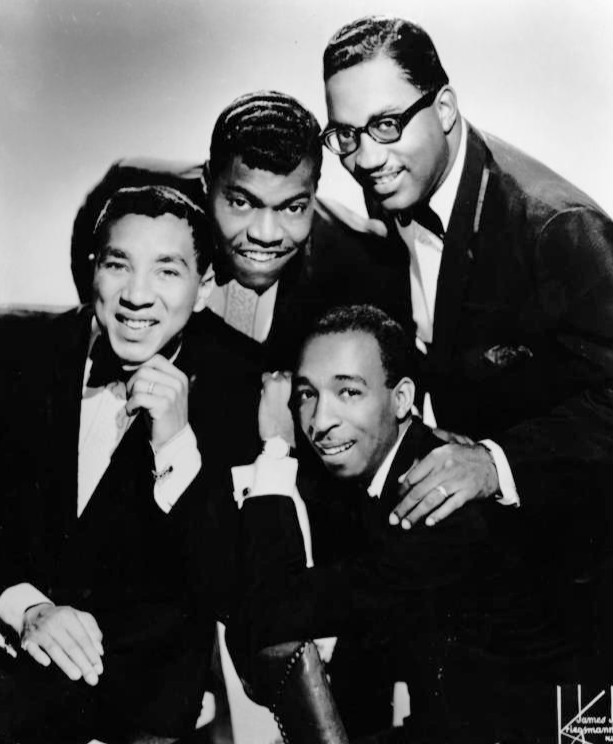
McCartney cited Smokey Robinson & the Miracles as inspiration for the song's melody.

Lennon's and McCartney's recollections differ regarding the music. Lennon said that McCartney's "contribution melodically was the harmony and the middle-eight." In 1977, when shown a list of songs Lennon claimed writing on for the magazine Hit Parader, "In My Life" was the only entry McCartney disputed. McCartney said he set Lennon's lyrics to music from beginning to end, taking inspiration from songs by Smokey Robinson & the Miracles. In 1976, he commented: "I liked 'In My Life'. Those were words that John wrote, and I wrote the tune to it. That was a great one."

== Recording ==
The song was recorded on 18 October 1965, and it was complete except for the instrumental bridge. At that time, Lennon had not decided what instrument to use, but he subsequently asked George Martin to play a piano solo, suggesting "something Baroque-sounding". Martin wrote a Bach-influenced piece that he found he could not play at the song's tempo. On 22 October, the solo was recorded with the tape running at half speed, so when played back at normal pace the piano was twice as fast and an octave higher, solving the performance challenge and also giving the solo a unique timbre, reminiscent of a harpsichord.

== Legacy ==
"In My Life" inspired pop music producers to use harpsichords in their arrangements. Rolling Stone magazine ranked "In My Life" number 23 on its 2004 list of "The 500 Greatest Songs of All Time", and number 98 on its 2021 list, as well as fifth on its list of the Beatles' "100 Greatest Songs". The song placed second on CBC's 50 Tracks. Mojo magazine named it the best song of all time in 2000.

== Personnel ==
According to Walter Everett:

The Beatles

- John Lennon – double-tracked vocal, rhythm guitar
- Paul McCartney – harmony vocal, bass guitar
- George Harrison – harmony vocal, lead guitar
- Ringo Starr – drums

Additional musician

- George Martin – piano, tambourine

== Charts ==
"In My Life" chart positions
Chart (2010)	Peak position
UK Singles (Official Charts Company)	78
US Billboard Hot 100 Recurrents	9

== Certifications ==
Region	Certification	Certified units/sales
New Zealand (RMNZ)	Platinum	30,000^{‡}
Spain (Promusicae)	Gold	30,000^{‡}
United Kingdom (BPI)	Platinum	600,000^{‡}
^{‡} Sales+streaming figures based on certification alone.
