= Mud Will Be Flung Tonight =

Mud Will Be Flung Tonight!

Live album by Bette Midler
- Released: December 1985
- Recorded: April 30, 1985 – May 1, 1985
- Venue: The Improvisation, Hollywood
- Genre: Comedy; pop
- Length: 39:56
- Label: Atlantic
- Producer: Bette Midler; Bob Kaminsky; Jerry Blatt

Bette Midler chronology
No Frills (1983)	Mud Will Be Flung Tonight! (1985)	Just Hits (1987)

Professional ratings
Review scores
Source	Rating
AllMusic	4/5 stars
Comedy on Record: The Complete Critical Discography	2.5/5 stars
The Encyclopedia of Popular Music	2/5 stars
The Rolling Stone Album Guide	2/5 stars

Mud Will Be Flung Tonight! is the third live and first comedy album by American singer and actress Bette Midler, released in December 1985, by Atlantic Records.

== Overview ==
It is a live recording of one of Midler's stand-up comedy shows performed in 1985. Although primarily a spoken word album, Midler is accompanied onstage by her long-time musical collaborator Marc Shaiman on piano. The album captures Midler "throwing mud into the faces of some of your favorites", among them Madonna ("Like a virgin.....? Touched for the very first time....? For the very first time today!") Meryl Streep, Bruce Springsteen and Olivia Newton-John ("Let's get physical... let me hear your body talk..... My body said "Fuck you!!!") and it also includes the original version of the song "Otto Titsling", three years later re-recorded in the studio and prominently featured in the movie Beaches.

Despite the positive critical reception, the album was not a sales success, reaching only number 183 on the US charts, which was the worst result for Midler in her career. The album was released on CD for the first time in 1989. Unlike the rest of Midler's discography up to this point, this album was never reissued on CD and is currently out of print.

== Critical reception ==
Charlotte Dillon of AllMusic retrospectively gave the album four stars out of five, stating that the album is worth buying because there is enough material on the album to laugh; she especially noted the tracks "The Unfettered Boob", "Taking Aim", "Fit or Fat" and "incredibly funny number" called "Marriage, Movies, Madonna and Mick". Robert Christgau called the album quite funny, not devoid of a certain style of the performer.

Keith Tuber from Orange Coast magazine, on the contrary, gave a negative assessment of the album, stating that Midler's main problem is not in the presentation of the material, but in the humor itself; according to the reviewer, she is used to shocking the public, but in the modern world, few people are shocked by jokes below the belt. In the end, he added that it is impossible to listen to the album without a liter of drunk wine, but who exactly will fly dirt, so it's in those who will buy this album.

For the album, Bette Midler was awarded the American Comedy Awards in the category "Funniest Record of the Year".

== Track listing ==
All tracks written by Bette Midler, except where noted.

Side A
No.	Title	Writer(s)	Length
1.	"Taking Aim"		5:09
2.	"Fit Or Fat 'Fat As I Am'"	Midler; Jerry Blatt; Marc Shaiman	3:10
3.	"Marriage, Movies, Madonna and Mick"		6:39
4.	"Vickie Eydie / I'm Singing Broadway"	Midler; Blatt	4:44

Side B
No.	Title	Writer(s)	Length
1.	"Coping"		1:40
2.	"The Unfettered Boob"		2:58
3.	"Otto Titsling"	Midler; Blatt; Charlene Seeger	4:20
4.	"Why Bother?"		6:44
5.	"Soph"		4:32
Total length:			39:56

== Personnel ==
- Bette Midler – vocals, record producer, writer
- Marc Shaiman – piano, musical arranger
- Bob Kaminsky – record producer
- Jerry Blatt – record producer
- Additional material by: Jerry Blatt, Frank Mula, Lenny Ripps, Marc Shaiman, Charlene Seeger, Bruce Vilanch
- Bonnie Bruckheimer-Martell – associate producer
- Mark Partis – second engineer
- Ralph Kelsey – assistant engineer
- Recorded by Guy Charboneau & Cliff Bonnell, Le Mobile
- Recorded at Budd Friedman's Improvisation, Los Angeles, California, April 30 – May 1, 1985
- Mixed and edited by John Alberts at Regent Sound Studio

== Charts ==
Chart performance for Mud Will Be Flung Tonight
Chart (1985)	Peak position
US Billboard 200	183
