= Some People's Lives =

Studio album by Bette Midler
- Released: September 4, 1990
- Studios: Battery Studios (New York City); BMG Studios (New York City); Electric Lady Studios (New York City); Greene Street Recording Studios (New York City); Ocean Way Recording (Hollywood); Studio 55 (Los Angeles); Studio Ultimo (Los Angeles)
- Length: 43:56
- Label: Atlantic
- Producer: Arif Mardin

Bette Midler chronology
Beaches (1988)	Some People's Lives (1990)	For the Boys (1991)

Singles from Some People's Lives
- 1. "From a Distance" Released: September 19, 1990; 2. "Night and Day" Released: January 15, 1991; 3. "The Gift of Love" Released: 1991; 4. "Moonlight Dancing" Released: 1991

Some People's Lives is the seventh album by the American singer Bette Midler. It was released by Atlantic Records on September 4, 1990, in the United States. It contains one of her biggest hits, "From a Distance", which won songwriter Julie Gold a Grammy Award for Song of the Year in 1991.

Some People's Lives became Midler's most commercially successful studio album, peaking at number 6 in the US and number 5 in the UK. It was certified double Platinum by the RIAA for sales of over two million copies in the US.

== Background ==
Following a series of successful Hollywood movies made throughout the 1980s, among them Down and Out in Beverly Hills, Ruthless People, Outrageous Fortune, Oliver and Company and Big Business, Midler returned to the music scene with a proper studio album in 1990, her first since 1983's rock and new wave-influenced No Frills. Some People's Lives, however, had more in common with the preceding soundtrack Beaches in that it featured both interpretations of jazz standards like "Miss Otis Regrets", "Spring Can Really Hang You Up the Most" and "He Was Too Good to Me" as well as more chart-oriented pop and adult contemporary material with contrasting synth-driven arrangements courtesy of producer Arif Mardin, his son Joe and Robbie Buchanan. The up-tempo track "Moonlight Dancing" (first recorded by pop/R&B group The Pointer Sisters) was written by noted hitmaker Diane Warren and "The Gift of Love" by Tom Kelly and Billy Steinberg and Susanna Hoffs. Steinberg and Kelly were the songwriting team behind Madonna's "Like a Virgin", Cyndi Lauper's "True Colors" and The Bangles' "Eternal Flame".

== Promotion ==
"Moonlight Dancing" (also released as an extended dance remix which sampled the 1973 recording "Do You Want to Dance?"), "Night and Day" and "The Gift of Love" were all issued as singles, but the biggest hit that the album produced was Midler's interpretation of Julie Gold's anthem of universal brotherhood "From a Distance" featuring The Radio Choir of New Hope Church. The single reached number 2 on the Billboard Hot 100 chart, number 1 on the Adult Contemporary chart and number 6 in the UK and was later certified platinum in the US, making it Midler's second million-seller within the space of two years (following "Wind Beneath My Wings" from the Beaches soundtrack). The song has since been recorded by a large number of other artists, and Midler herself included an alternate version with partly re-written lyrics on her 2006 album Cool Yule.

== Critical reception ==
Professional ratings
Review scores
Source	Rating
AllMusic	4/5 stars
Calgary Herald	C
Chicago Tribune	3/4 stars
Robert Christgau	(choice cut)
Entertainment Weekly	D
Los Angeles Times	2/4 stars
The Rolling Stone Album Guide	2/5 stars

AllMusic editor Bryan Buss called the album "one of the singer's strongest collections." He felt that aside from "poor production" on "From a Distance," Some People's Lives was "a smooth collection of standards [...] This is Midler at her best – playful, yearning, brassy, regretful – and that is mostly because producer Arif Mardin surrounds his star with respectful production that matches her talent while accenting her strengths." Los Angeles Times critic Dennis Hunt criticized the album for its "overload of whiny, dirge-like ballads [...] Fortunately, there's nothing on the album quite as unabashedly sentimental as "Wind Beneath My Wings," but many of the songs have those same sappy overtones."

== Commercial performance ==
Some People's Lives became the biggest commercial success of Midler's musical career. It reached its highest peak in the United Kingdom, where it entered the top five and reached gold status in July 1991. In the United States, it peaked at number 6 on the US Billboard 200, becoming her highest-charting album since Bette Midler (1973). Exceeding shipments of more than 2 million copies, it was certified double platinum by the Recording Industry Association of America (RIAA) in March 1991. Elsewhere, the album entered the top ten in Australia, Canada, and New Zealand, while reaching number 15 on the German Albums Chart and number 27 on the Austrian Albums Chart.

Some People's Lives was classified as the 36th best-selling album of 1991 in Australia. In Canada, the set became the 60th most-selling album in 1990, while in 1991 it scored at number 36 on the End-of-Year chart. Billboard ranked it 16th on its 1991 year-end chart.

== Track listing ==
Some People's Lives track listing
No.	Title	Writer(s)	Arranger(s)	Length
1.	"One More Round"	Jessica Harper; Danny Sembello; Allee Willis	Joe Mardin; Marc Shaiman; Arif Mardin	2:03
2.	"Some People's Lives"	Rhonda Fleming; Janis Ian	Shaiman	3:29
3.	"Miss Otis Regrets"	Cole Porter	Shaiman	2:51
4.	"Spring Can Really Hang You Up the Most"	Fran Landesman; Tommy Wolf	Shaiman	5:30
5.	"Night and Day"	Billie Hughes; Roxanne Seeman	J. Mardin; Billie Hughes; A. Mardin	5:30
6.	"The Girl Is On to You"	Jude Johnstone	Shaiman	4:10
7.	"From a Distance"	Julie Gold	Mardin; Steve Skinner	4:37
8.	"Moonlight Dancing"	Diane Warren	Mardin	4:39
9.	"He Was Too Good to Me"/"Since You Stayed Here"	Richard Rodgers; Lorenz Hart; Peter Larson; Josh Rubins	Mardin; Shaiman	4:12
10.	"All of a Sudden"	Nathalie Archangel; Scott Wilk	Mardin	4:33
11.	"The Gift of Love"	Tom Kelly; Billy Steinberg; Susanna Hoffs	Mardin; Robbie Buchanan	4:02

== Personnel ==
Musicians

- Bette Midler – all vocals (1–6, 8, 9), lead vocals (7, 10)
- Joe Mardin – keyboards (1, 5, 8, 10), programming (1, 5, 8, 10), arrangements (1, 8, 10), keyboard solo (5), conductor (8), backing vocals (10)
- Marc Shaiman – arrangements (1–4, 6), acoustic piano (2, 9), conductor (2, 3, 4, 6), vocal arrangements (7, 8), basic rhythm arrangements (9)
- Bernie Layton – acoustic piano (3)
- Robbie Buchanan – keyboards (6, 7, 11), programming (6, 11), additional programming (8)
- Michael Boddicker – additional synthesizers (6), additional programming (11)
- Guy Roche – additional programming (8)
- Gene Bertoncini – guitars (3)
- Michael Landau – guitars (6, 7)
- Dean Parks – guitars (6, 11)
- John McCurry – guitars (10)
- Andrew Gold – guitar solo (11)
- Ron Carter – bass (3)
- Neil Stubenhaus – bass (6, 7, 11)
- Jay Leonhart – bass (9)
- Grady Tate – drums (3)
- Carlos Vega – drums (6, 7, 11)
- Steve Kroon – percussion (1)
- Gary Coleman – percussion (6)
- Phil Bodner – clarinet solo (3)
- Nino Tempo – tenor saxophone (4)
- Andy Snitzer – soprano sax solo (6)
- Arif Mardin – arrangements (1, 5, 7, 11), orchestral arrangements and conductor (9)
- Billie Hughes – arrangements (5)
- Steve Skinner – arrangements (7)
- Sid Page – concertmaster (2)
- Bruce Dukov – concertmaster (4)
- Gene Orloff – concertmaster (9)
- Charlotte Crossley – backing vocals (7)
- Cissy Houston – backing vocals (7)
- Jo Ann Harris – backing vocals (7)
- David Lasley – backing vocals (7)
- Myrna Smith – backing vocals (7)
- Gene Van Buren – backing vocals (7)
- John West – backing vocals (7)
- The Radio Choir of New Hope Church – backing vocals (7)
- Ula Hedwig – backing vocals (10)
- George Merrill – backing vocals (10)
- Tom Kelly – backing vocals (11), vocal arrangements (11)
- Maria Vidal – backing vocals (11)

Production

- Arif Mardin – producer
- Marc Shaiman – associate producer
- Jack Joseph Puig – recording, mixing
- Joe Mardin – additional recording (1), additional mixing (1)
- Eddie Garcia – additional recording (1), additional mixing (1)
- Michael O'Reilly – additional recording (1), additional mixing (1)
- Nick Sansano – additional recording (1), additional mixing (1)
- Ken Felton – assistant engineer
- Rob Harvey – assistant engineer
- Ed Korengo – assistant engineer
- Bob Loftus – assistant engineer
- Gabriel Moffat – assistant engineer
- James Nichols – assistant engineer
- Clif Norrell – assistant engineer
- Anthony Saunders – assistant engineer
- Jamie Staub – assistant engineer
- Doug Sax – mastering
- Marsha Burns – production coordination
- Lisa Maldonado – additional coordination
- Vicky Germaise – additional coordination
- Frank DeCaro – orchestra contractor
- Gene Orloff – orchestra contractor
- Greg Gorman – photography
- Bob Defrin – art direction, design

Studios

- Recorded at Ocean Way Recording (Hollywood, California); Studio 55 and Studio Ultimo (Los Angeles, California); Electric Lady Studios, Battery Studios, BMG Studios and Greene St. Recording (New York City, New York).
- Mixed at Studio 55 and Electric Lady Studios.
- Mastered at The Mastering Lab (Hollywood, California).

== Charts ==
=== Weekly charts ===
Weekly chart performance for Some People's Lives
Chart (1990–1991)	Peak position
Australian Albums (ARIA)	7
Austrian Albums (Ö3 Austria)	27
Canada Top Albums/CDs (RPM)	7
European Albums (Music & Media)	34
German Albums (Offizielle Top 100)	15
Japanese Albums (Oricon)	66
New Zealand Albums (RMNZ)	10
UK Albums (Official Charts)	5
US Billboard 200	6
US Top 200 Albums (Cash Box)	4

=== Year-end charts ===
Year-end chart performance for Some People's Lives
Chart (1991)	Position
Australian Albums (ARIA)	36
New Zealand Albums (RMNZ)	50
US Billboard 200	16
US Top 50 Pop Albums (Cash Box)	35

== Certifications ==
Certifications for Some People's Lives
Region	Certification	Certified units/sales
Australia (ARIA)	2× Platinum	140,000^{^}
Canada (Music Canada)	2× Platinum	200,000^{^}
New Zealand (RMNZ)	Gold	7,500^{^}
United Kingdom (BPI)	Gold	100,000^{^}
United States (RIAA)	2× Platinum	2,000,000^{^}
^{^} Shipments figures based on certification alone.
