= Marc Shaiman =

American composer (born 1959)

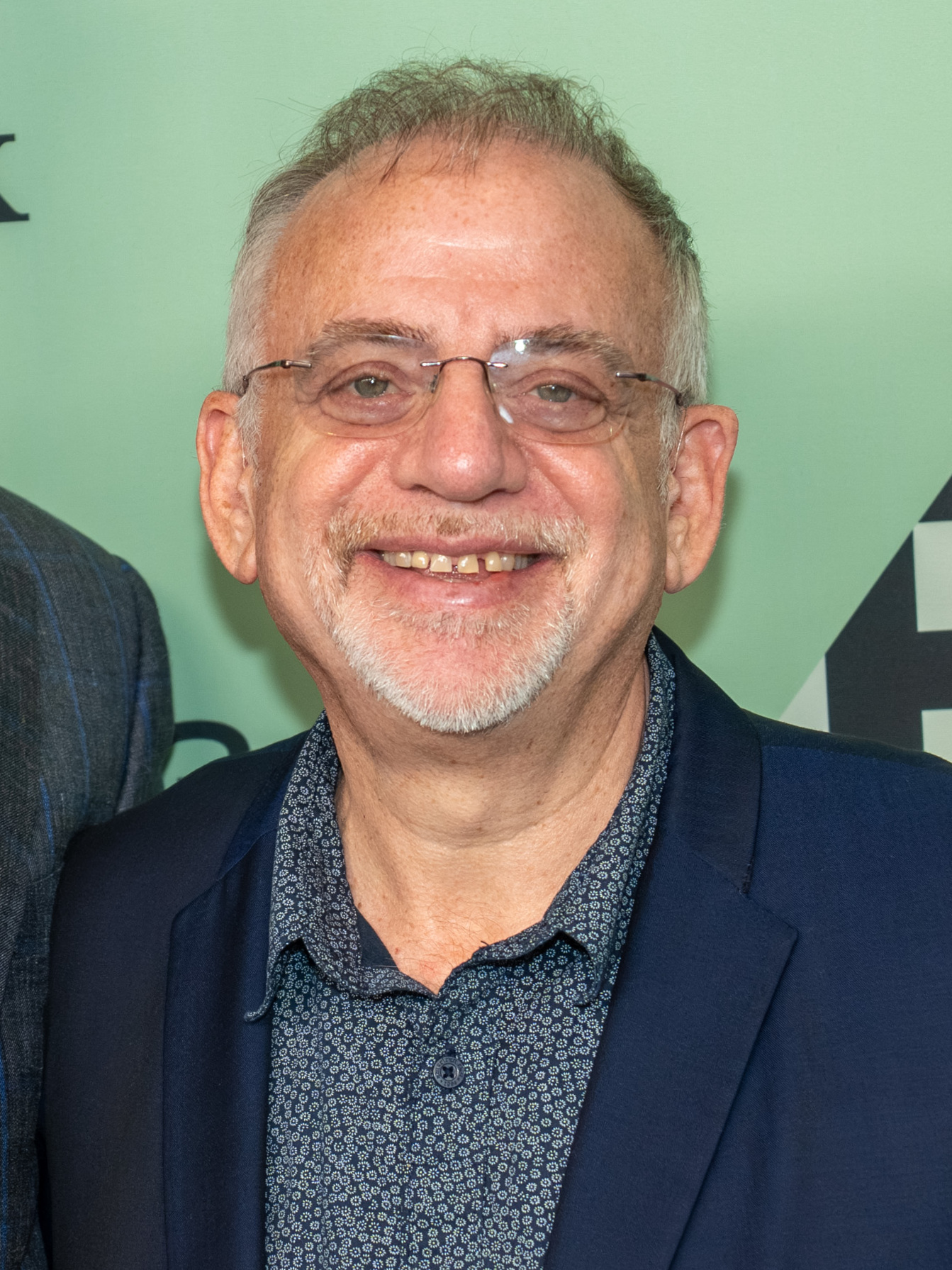
- Shaiman at the 2025 New York Film Festival
- Born: October 22, 1959 (age 66); Newark, New Jersey, U.S.
- Occupations: Composer; lyricist
- Spouse: Louis Mirabal (m. 2016)
- Website: marcshaiman.com

Marc Shaiman (/ˈʃeɪmən/ SHAY-mən; born October 22, 1959) is an American composer and lyricist for films, television, and theatre, widely known for his collaborations with lyricist and director Scott Wittman, actor Billy Crystal, entertainer Bette Midler, and director Rob Reiner. Shaiman has received numerous accolades including two Grammy Awards, two Primetime Emmy Awards, a Tony Award — as well as seven Academy Award nominations.

== Early life, family and education ==
Shaiman was born to a Jewish family in Newark, New Jersey, on October 22, 1959, the son of Claire (née Goldfein) and William Robert Shaiman. He grew up in Scotch Plains, New Jersey, where he attended Scotch Plains-Fanwood High School, but he left school at age 16 to start working in New York's theaters; he later obtained a GED.

== Career ==
Shaiman started his career as a theatre/cabaret musical director. He started working at Saturday Night Live as an arranger/writer. He portrayed Skip St. Thomas, the accompanying pianist for The Sweeney Sisters, a singing duo played by Nora Dunn and Jan Hooks, which earned him an Emmy nomination; he returned for an appearance on The Saturday Night Live 40th Anniversary Special, having co-created Martin Short and Maya Rudolph's salute to musical sketch characters. He began his professional relationships with Billy Crystal and Martin Short during his tenure at the show. He also was a vocal arranger for Bette Midler, eventually becoming her musical director and co-producer of many of her recordings, including "The Wind Beneath My Wings" and "From a Distance." He helped create the material for her performance on the penultimate The Tonight Show Starring Johnny Carson. His work with both Midler and Billy Crystal led to his involvement on their films. He later produced Midler's album It's the Girls, which had the highest debut of Midler's recording career on the Billboard Album charts, and co-wrote Crystal's farewell to Jay Leno which featured Carol Burnett and Oprah Winfrey among others.

His film credits include Broadcast News, Beaches, When Harry Met Sally..., City Slickers, The Addams Family, Sister Act, Sleepless in Seattle, A Few Good Men, The American President, The First Wives Club, George of the Jungle, In & Out, Patch Adams, South Park: Bigger, Longer & Uncut, Team America: World Police, Hairspray, Flipped, Mary Poppins Returns and HBO's From the Earth to the Moon and 61*. On television, he worked on the final performances for Johnny Carson's Tonight Show (with Bette Midler), Conan O'Brien's Late Night (with Nathan Lane), both of Jay Leno's final Tonight Show broadcasts, and Nathan Lane's farewell to David Letterman called "Dead Inside."

Shaiman has earned seven Academy Award nominations, a Tony Award and a Grammy Award for his work on the musical Hairspray, and an Emmy Award for co-writing Billy Crystal's Academy Award performances. He has also been Grammy-nominated for his arrangements for Harry Connick Jr.'s recordings When Harry Met Sally... and We Are in Love as well as Hairspray and Smash and Emmy-nominated for his work on Saturday Night Live and Smash. In 2002, he was honored with the "Outstanding Achievement in Music-In-Film" award at The Hollywood Film Festival, and in 2007 he was honored with ASCAP's Henry Mancini Award in recognition of his outstanding achievements and contributions to the music of film and television. He is the first recipient of the Film & TV Music Award for Best Score for a Comedy Feature Film. He wrote and sang the song "Yes" for his agent's film Finding Kraftland, and co-wrote (with partner Scott Wittman) songs for Neil Patrick Harris when Harris hosted the 63rd Tony Awards (2009) and the 61st Primetime Emmy Awards (2009), and was Emmy-nominated for musical directing and co-writing the 82nd Academy Awards (2010).

Shaiman co-produced and co-wrote cuts on Mariah Carey's 2010 Christmas album Merry Christmas II You. He and Wittman wrote original songs for the musical-based television show for NBC, Smash, which ran from 2012 to 2013, and served as executive producers. For their song "Let Me Be Your Star," Shaiman and co-lyricist Wittman were nominated for both an Emmy Award and a Grammy Award, and as executive producers they were nominated for the Golden Globe Award for Best Television Series - Comedy or Musical.

Shaiman and Wittman were honored on April 28, 2014, by The New York Pops Orchestra at Carnegie Hall. The following year, Jennifer Hudson sang the Smash song "I Can't Let Go" at the 87th Academy Awards during the in memoriam tribute, featuring revised lyrics. The duo's Broadway musical Charlie and the Chocolate Factory ran on Broadway at the Lunt-Fontanne Theatre, after finishing a four-year run on London's West End at The Royal Drury Lane Theater. Shaiman was Tony-nominated for his orchestrations for their previous Broadway musical Catch Me If You Can. In 2021, they wrote a song titled "Save the City" for the Marvel Cinematic Universe (MCU) in-universe Broadway production titled Rogers: The Musical featured in the first episode of Hawkeye, "Never Meet Your Heroes". It was released as a single on November 24, the day the episode became available on Disney+.

In February 2021, it was announced that Shaiman and Wittman were writing songs for a new musical adaptation of Some Like It Hot, which premiered on Broadway in 2022 with a book by Amber Ruffin and Matthew Lopez.

In March 2026, Shaiman accompanied Nathan Lane on piano for his performance of the song 'Laughing Matters' from the musical When Pigs Fly, marking Lane's final appearance on The Late Show with Stephen Colbert.

== Activism ==
In 2008, a controversy erupted nationwide when California Musical Theatre's then artistic director Scott Eckern resigned over the revelation of his personal donation of $1,000 to a political campaign to support California Proposition 8, an amendment which enshrined into the California Constitution that "only marriage between a man and a woman [was] recognized in California". After the amendment was passed, donor information became public. Shaiman and other Broadway artists who had previously worked with the director became critical and called for a boycott of the theatre by all gay artists and performers, ending in the director's resignation days later.

To protest the passage of California Proposition 8 in November 2008, Shaiman wrote a satiric mini-musical Prop 8 – The Musical. The three-minute video was distributed on the internet at FunnyOrDie.com, beginning on December 3, 2008. It was written and produced in just a few days. The cast includes Jack Black (who plays Jesus), Neil Patrick Harris, John C. Reilly, Allison Janney, Andy Richter, Maya Rudolph, Margaret Cho, and Rashida Jones. Shaiman plays the piano and appears briefly in the video. It received 1.2 million internet hits in its first day.

== Personal life ==
Shaiman is openly gay, and married Louis Mirabal, a retired lieutenant commander in the U.S. Navy, on March 26, 2016. He lives in both Manhattan and upstate New York.

For 25 years he was in a relationship with Scott Wittman, his lyricist partner.

Shaiman's memoir, Never Mind the Happy: Showbiz Stories From a Sore Winner, was published in January 2026 and became an instant New York Times best seller.

== Filmography (composer unless otherwise noted) ==
=== Films ===
Year	Title	Director	Notes
1987	Broadcast News	James L. Brooks	actor
1988	Big Business	Jim Abrahams	Songs only
1988	Beaches	Garry Marshall	Music supervisor
1989	When Harry Met Sally...	Rob Reiner	—N/a
1990	Misery	Rob Reiner	—N/a
1991	Scenes from a Mall	Paul Mazursky	—N/a
1991	City Slickers	Ron Underwood	—N/a
1991	The Addams Family	Barry Sonnenfeld	—N/a
1991	Hot Shots!	Jim Abrahams	Actor
1991	For the Boys	Mark Rydell	Songs only
1992	Sister Act	Emile Ardolino	—N/a
1992	Mr. Saturday Night	Billy Crystal	—N/a
1992	A Few Good Men	Rob Reiner	—N/a
1993	Sleepless in Seattle	Nora Ephron	—N/a
1993	Heart and Souls	Ron Underwood	—N/a
1993	Hocus Pocus	Kenny Ortega	Musical arrangement: Additional arrangements
1993	Life with Mikey	James Lapine	—N/a
1993	Addams Family Values	Barry Sonnenfeld	—N/a
1993	Sister Act 2: Back in the Habit	Bill Duke	—N/a
1994	City Slickers II: The Legend of Curly's Gold	Paul Weiland	—N/a
1994	North	Rob Reiner	—N/a
1994	Speechless	Ron Underwood	—N/a
1994	That's Entertainment! III	Bud Friedgen and Michael J. Sheridan	—N/a
1995	Stuart Saves His Family	Harold Ramis	—N/a
1995	Forget Paris	Billy Crystal	—N/a
1995	The American President	Rob Reiner	—N/a
1996	Bogus	Norman Jewison	—N/a
1996	Mother	Albert Brooks	—N/a
1996	The First Wives Club	Hugh Wilson	—N/a
1996	Ghosts of Mississippi	Rob Reiner	—N/a
1997	George of the Jungle	Sam Weisman	—N/a
1997	In & Out	Frank Oz	—N/a
1998	My Giant	Michael Lehmann	—N/a
1998	Simon Birch	Mark Steven Johnson	—N/a
1998	Patch Adams	Tom Shadyac	—N/a
1999	The Out-of-Towners	Sam Weisman	—N/a
1999	South Park: Bigger, Longer & Uncut	Trey Parker	First score for an animated film
1999	The Story of Us	Rob Reiner	With Eric Clapton
1999	Get Bruce	Andrew J. Kuehn	Appears as himself
2000	The Kid	Jon Turteltaub	—N/a
2001	Get Over It	Tommy O'Haver	Songs only
2001	One Night at McCool's	Harald Zwart	—N/a
2001	The Wedding Planner	Adam Shankman	—N/a
2001	What's The Worst That Could Happen?	Sam Weisman	—N/a
2003	Down with Love	Peyton Reed	—N/a
2003	Alex & Emma	Rob Reiner	—N/a
2003	The Cat in the Hat	Bo Welch	Songs only
2003	Marci X	Richard Benjamin	Songs only
2004	Team America: World Police	Trey Parker	Song only Score was rejected and replaced by Harry Gregson-Williams
2005	Rumor Has It...	Rob Reiner	—N/a
2007	Hairspray	Adam Shankman	—N/a
2007	The Bucket List	Rob Reiner	—N/a
2007	Bee Movie	Simon J. Smith and Steve Hickner	Song in end credits only
2010	Flipped	Rob Reiner	—N/a
2012	The Magic of Belle Isle	Rob Reiner	—N/a
2012	Parental Guidance	Andy Fickman	—N/a
2014	And So It Goes	Rob Reiner	—N/a
2016	LBJ	Rob Reiner	—N/a
2017	The Star	Timothy Reckart	—N/a
2018	Mary Poppins Returns	Rob Marshall	—N/a
2021	Tick, Tick... Boom!	Lin-Manuel Miranda	Cameo appearance
2022	Bros	Nicholas Stoller	—N/a
2022	Hocus Pocus 2	Anne Fletcher	Additional lyrics / song and vocal producer
2023	Albert Brooks: Defending My Life	Rob Reiner	—N/a

=== Television ===
Year	Title	Notes
1984–1985, 1986–1987	Saturday Night Live	
1986	Comic Relief	
1986	Billy Crystal: Don't Get Me Started	Television special
1987	Billy Crystal: Don't Get Me Started - The Lost Minutes	Television special
1988	The Mondo Beyondo Show	
1989	I, Martin Short, Goes Hollywood	Television film
1989	What's Alan Watching?	Television special
1990	Billy Crystal: Midnight Train To Moscow	Television special
1990	62nd Academy Awards	Television special
1991	63rd Academy Awards	Television special
1992	64th Academy Awards	Television special
1992	The Tonight Show Starring Johnny Carson	Episode: "Robin Williams/Bette Midler"
1993	65th Academy Awards	Television special
1997	69th Academy Awards	Television special
1997	Bette Midler in Concert: Diva Las Vegas	
1998	70th Academy Awards	Television special
1998	From the Earth to the Moon	Episode: "The Original Wives Club"
1999	Saturday Night Live 25th Anniversary Special	Television special
1999, 2002	South Park	Composer (Episode: "Mr. Hankey's Christmas Classics"); Actor (Episode: "Cripple Fight")
1999	Jackie's Back	Television film
2000	72nd Academy Awards	Television special
2000	Bette	
2001	61*	Television film
2002	Greg the Bunny	
2003	Charlie Lawrence	
2003	The Score	
2004	Biography	Episode: "Bette Midler"
2004	76th Academy Awards	Television special
2005	77th Academy Awards	Television special
2007	79th Academy Awards	Television special
2009	63rd Tony Awards	Television special
2009	61st Primetime Emmy Awards	Television special
2010	82nd Academy Awards	Television special
2010	The Kennedy Center Honors	Television special
2012	84th Academy Awards	Television special
2012–2013	Smash	
2015	Saturday Night Live 40th Anniversary Special	Television special
2015	87th Academy Awards	Television special
2016	Hairspray Live!	Television special
2020	Mariah Carey's Magical Christmas Special	Television special
2021	The Prince	Episode: "School Musical Part 2"
2021	Hawkeye	2 episodes
2023	Only Murders in the Building	
2023	The Kennedy Center Honors	Television special

=== Theatre ===
Broadway

- Peter Allen: Up in One (1979)
- Bette! Divine Madness (1980)
- André De Shields' Haarlem Nocturne (1984)
- Leader of the Pack (1985)
- An Evening with Harry Connick Jr. and Orchestra (1990)
- Patti LuPone on Broadway (1995)
- Hairspray (2002)
- The Odd Couple (2005)
- Martin Short: Fame Becomes Me (2006)
- Catch Me If You Can (2009)
- Charlie and the Chocolate Factory (2017)
- Some Like It Hot (2022)
- Smash (2025)

West End

- Charlie and the Chocolate Factory (2013)

Off-Broadway

- Dementos - The Production Company
- Livin' Dolls - Manhattan Theatre Club
- Legends - Ahmanson Theatre
- The Sound of Muzak - Club 82
- Trilogy of Terror - Club 57
- Non Pasquale - Delacorte Theatre

Disney Parks

- Rogers: The Musical - Hyperion Theatre

=== Internet ===
- Prop 8 - The Musical (2008) (composer, lyricist, pianist) - 2009 "Webby" winner for Best Comedy: Short or Individual Episode
- Soundtrack of Our Lives: A Celebration for the Film and TV Music Community (2020) ("The End Titles" song)

== Discography ==
Mariah Carey

- Merry Christmas II You

Bette Midler

- Thighs and Whispers
- Mud Will Be Flung Tonight
- Some People's Lives
- Experience the Divine
- Bette
- Bathhouse Betty
- It's the Girls!

Harry Connick Jr.

- We Are in Love

Peter Allen

- Making Every Moment Count

Original Broadway cast recordings

- Hairspray
- Martin Short: Fame Becomes Me
- Catch Me If You Can
- Charlie and the Chocolate Factory the Musical (West End musical)
- Charlie and the Chocolate Factory the Musical (Broadway musical)
- Some Like It Hot (Broadway musical)

Soundtracks

- The Addams Family
- Addams Family Values
- Beaches
- When Harry Met Sally...
- Heart and Souls
- For the Boys
- City Slickers
- A Few Good Men
- Sister Act
- Sleepless in Seattle
- Hocus Pocus
- North
- The American President
- The Out-of-Towners
- South Park: Bigger, Longer & Uncut (with Trey Parker)
- Mr. Hankey's Christmas Classics (with Matt Stone)
- The Story of Us
- Alex & Emma
- Rumor Has It...
- Hairspray
- The Bucket List
- Smash Season One
- Smash Season Two
- Bombshell
- Hairspray Live!
- The Star
- Mary Poppins Returns
- Hocus Pocus 2

== Concert/cabaret work ==
- Peter Allen
- Jack Black & Will Ferrell
- Kristin Chenoweth
- Rosemary Clooney
- Harry Connick Jr.
- Billy Crystal
- Christine Ebersole
- Ellen Foley
- Whoopi Goldberg
- Annie Golden
- The Harlettes
- The High-Heeled Women
- Lauryn Hill
- Jennifer Holliday
- Allison Janney
- Laura Kenyon
- Nathan Lane
- Ute Lemper
- Jenifer Lewis
- Darlene Love
- Patti LuPone
- Lypsinka
- Ann Magnuson
- Andrea Martin
- Lonette McKee
- Bette Midler
- Catherine O'Hara
- Sarah Jessica Parker
- Zora Rasmussen
- Ann Reinking
- Debbie Shapiro Gravitte
- Martin Short
- Barbra Streisand
- Donald Trump
- Tracey Ullman
- Luther Vandross
- Bruce Vilanch
- Steven Weber
- Raquel Welch
- Robin Williams

== Accolades ==
For his work as a composer and lyricist for films, television, and theatre, Shaiman has received numerous accolades including two Emmy Awards, two Grammy Awards and a Tony Award as well as nominations for seven Academy Awards, two BAFTA Awards, and two Golden Globe Awards. He earned the Hollywood Film Award for Outstanding Contribution to Music and Film in 2002.
