= Beaches (musical) =

2014 stage musical

- 2026 Broadway production poster
- Music: Mike Stoller
- Lyrics: Iris Rainer Dart
- Book: Iris Rainer Dart; Thom Thomas
- Basis: Beaches (1985); By: Iris Rainer Dart
- Premiere: February 8, 2014: Signature Theatre
- Productions: 2026 Broadway

Beaches is a stage musical with music by Mike Stoller, lyrics by Iris Rainer Dart, and a book by Dart and Thom Thomas. It is based on Dart's 1985 novel of the same name.

The show tells the story of two women, Cee Cee Bloom and Bertie White, lifelong friends who begin as pen pals and navigate life together through its trials and tribulations. The title comes from the beach in Atlantic City where the two girls first meet as children.

The show includes the Grammy Award-winning song "Wind Beneath My Wings", written by Jeff Silbar and Larry Henley, made famous by Bette Midler in the 1988 Disney film version of the story.

The musical opened on Broadway at the Majestic Theatre on April 22, 2026 to negative reviews.

== Production history ==
The show had its world premiere at the Signature Theatre in Arlington, Virginia beginning February 8, 2014 and running through March 29, directed by Eric D. Schaeffer. In its original production, the show's music was written by David Austin.

The show next moved to Chicago again directed by Schaeffer, where it was performed at the Drury Lane Oakbrook Theatre from July 2 until August 16, 2015. Book writer Thom Thomas died in December 2015, halting further progress on the show.

Nearly a decade later, in 2024, the show was re-tooled with new music by Mike Stoller, orchestrations by Charlie Rosen, and a revised book by Dart. The show opened at Theatre Calgary on May 18 running until June 16, 2024, co-directed by Lonny Price and Matt Cowart.

In 2025, it was announced this production of the show would transfer to Broadway for a limited run, opening on April 22, 2026 and closing on September 6, before embarking on a national tour.

This production played its final performance on May 24th, 2026, earlier than its original closing date, September 6th, after 38 regular performances and 28 preview performances.

== Characters ==
- Cecelia Carol "Cee Cee" Bloom - a street-smart singer and actress from the Bronx
- Roberta "Bertie" White - a waifish book-smart girl and eventual lawyer from San Francisco
- John Perry - a love interest for both Cee and Bertie and eventual husband of Cee Cee
- Leona Bloom - Cee Cee's brassy, overbearing stage mother
- Rose White - Bertie's stuffy, high society mother
- Michael Barron - a lawyer and Bertie's eventual husband
- Nina Barron - Bertie and Michael's daughter
- Janice Carnes - Bertie's caretaker

== Original casts ==
Character	World Premiere (2014)	Chicago (2015)	Calgary (2024)	Broadway (2026)
Cee Cee Bloom	Alysha Umphress	Shoshana Bean	Jessica Vosk	Jessica Vosk
Bertie White	Mara Davi	Whitney Bashor	Kelli Barrett	Kelli Barrett
John Perry	Matthew Scott	Travis Taylor	Brent Thiessen	Brent Thiessen
Michael Barron	Cliff Samuels	Jim DeSelm	Nathan Gibb Johnson	Ben Jacoby
Leona Bloom	Donna Migliaccio	Nancy Voigts	Jamie Konchak	Sarah Bockel
Cee Cee Bloom (teen)	Gracie Jones	Samantha Pauly	Jillian Hubler-McManus	Bailey Ryon
Bertie White (teen)	Maya Brettell	Olivia Renteria	Katie McMillan	Emma Ogea
Rose White	Helen Hedman	Kelly Anne Clark	Emily Dallas	Lael Van Keuren

== Musical numbers ==
2024 Canadian & 2026 Broadway Production.

Act I

- "You Believe in Me" - Cee Cee, Ensemble
- "Mother Said - Little Bertie
- "Watchin' a Star - Little Cee Cee
- "Wish I Could Be Like You - Little Cee Cee, Little Bertie
- "The Letters" - Little Cee Cee, Little Bertie
- "Show The World" - Cee Cee, Bertie, Teen Cee Cee, Teen Bertie, Little Cee Cee, Little Bertie
- "Wish I Could Be Like You" (reprise) - Cee Cee, Bertie
- "Brand New Me" - Bertie
- "A Real Woman" - Cee Cee
- "Wish I Could Be Like You" (reprise 3) - Cee Cee
- "Size D Letters" - Cee Cee, Bertie
- "Holy Moley" - Little Cee Cee, Little Bertie, Ensemble
- "God Bless Girlfriends" - John, Michael
- "My Best" - Bertie

Act II

- "I'm All I Need" - Cee Cee, Ensemble
- "The Words I Should Have Said" - Cee Cee, Bertie
- "The Words I Should Have Said" (reprise) - Cee Cee, Bertie
- "I'm All I Need" (reprise) - John
- "Normal" - Bertie, Cee
- "Birthday Letters" - Bertie, Nina
- "Nina's Letter" - Nina
- "A Day at the Beach" - Cee Cee, Bertie
- "My Best" - Cee Cee
- "Wind Beneath My Wings" - Cee Cee, Teen Cee Cee, Little Cee Cee

== Reception ==
The show's Broadway run received largely mixed to negative reviews, with many publications criticizing the weak score and low budget staging. Laura Collins-Hughes for The New York Times stated "Bertie’s impending death is the frame for the story of their friendship, the telling of which is distractingly sloppy",, while Adam Feldman for Time Out called it "mostly...just banal and inconsistent, particularly in Bertie’s material." Greg Evans of Deadline called the stage adaptation of Beaches "a mostly forgettable endeavor" down to its core, saying that the production failed to convey the original film's "slight if soggy" charms because of what he saw as the tackiness of the sets, performances, and character. Sarah Hearon of Entertainment Weekly said that Bertie's character development was stunted because the storyline attempted to hew closely to the original novel. Richard Lawson of The Guardian regarded the set as relying too extensively on projections, and he said the musical's book, while "often amusing and joke-filled", did not do much emotionally to build up toward the show's climax. Both Hearon and Lawson praised Vosk's performance.

== Awards and nominations ==
=== Broadway production ===
Year	Award	Category	Work	Result	Ref.
2026	Drama League Awards	Outstanding Production of a Musical		Nominated	
2026	Drama League Awards	Distinguished Performance	Jessica Vosk	Nominated	
2026	Outer Critics Circle Award	Outstanding Lead Performer in a Broadway Musical	Jessica Vosk	Nominated	
