= Beaches (2017 film) =

2017 drama television film

- DVD cover
- Genre: Drama
- Based on: Beaches by Iris Rainer Dart; Beaches by Mary Agnes Donoghue
- Teleplay by: Nikole Beckwith; Kate Lanier
- Directed by: Allison Anders
- Starring: Idina Menzel; Nia Long; Gabriella Pizzolo; Antonio Cupo; Colin Lawrence; Sanai Victoria; Grace Capeless
- Music by: Lesley Barber
- Country of origin: United States
- Original language: English

Production
- Executive producers: Alison Greenspan; Denise Di Novi
- Producers: Harvey Kahn; S. Lily Hui
- Cinematography: John Brawley
- Editor: Mark Bourgeois
- Running time: 87 minutes
- Production company: A&E Studios

Original release
- Network: Lifetime
- Release: January 21, 2017

Beaches is a 2017 American drama television film directed by Allison Anders and written by Nikole Beckwith and Kate Lanier. It is a remake of the 1988 film, based on the 1985 novel by Iris Rainer Dart. The film stars Idina Menzel and Nia Long. The film premiered on Lifetime on January 21, 2017.

== Premise ==
Two friends, one being a professional and the other a performer, maintain a long-lasting friendship through childhood, love, and tragedy.

== Cast ==
- Idina Menzel as CC Bloom, the friend of Hillary
  - Gabriella Pizzolo as young CC Bloom
- Nia Long as Hillary Whitney, the friend of CC
  - Grace Capeless as young Hillary Whitney
- Antonio Cupo as John Pierce, CC's fiancé
- Colin Lawrence as Bryan, Hillary's fiancé
- Sanai Victoria as Tory Whitney, Hillary's daughter and CC's goddaughter
- Barbara Beall as costume designer
- Daniel Letto as Sorcerer actor
- Rebecca Husain as Pretty Sinners director
- Graeme Duffy as Sorcerer composer
- Kate Isaac as assistant district attorney
- Jane Hancock as Ashley

== Production ==
On July 28, 2016, the film was announced, with Idina Menzel joining the cast. On August 16, 2016, it was announced Nia Long had joined the cast. Principal photography began on August 15, 2016.

== Reception ==
Beaches received negative reviews, with most critics assessing it as inferior to the 1988 original. On the review aggregator website Rotten Tomatoes, 44% of 9 critics' reviews are positive, with an average rating of 6/10. Mike Hale of The New York Times pointed out the absurdity of remaking Beaches, itself a 1950s throwback which failed to update its themes to the decades in which the film is set. He added, "Stuffing the story into 70 percent of the time makes C. C. and Hillary's cycle of fights and reconciliations feel more arbitrary than ever, especially in the absence of [Bette] Midler, whose vivid portrayal of C. C. provided motivations that weren't in the script." Blake Meredith of the Los Angeles Times wrote, "Any time a beloved movie or TV series gets a remake, knee-jerk purists howl about it 'ruining' the original. 'Beaches' [...] is the rare case of a remake that might actually do just that." She explained that by reducing the length to 90 minutes while otherwise staying faithful to the original film only serves to make the silliness of the original Beaches stand out more clearly, particularly noting how the shorter length forces most of the plot to be delivered through exposition. CNN Entertainment described it as tedious and dated, but said Menzel's singing is a highlight and makes the film arguably worth watching by Lifetime standards. The Boston Globe said it echoed the chief shortcoming of the original film, the lack of substantial basis for C.C. and Hillary's friendship. Reviewer Matthew Gilbert stated, "It's not so much that Menzel and Long are bad – they're consistently OK, if never better than that — but the story is too hollow for them to dig in. Singer-actress CC and lawyer Hillary meet as kids, become pen pals, room together, fall in love with the same guy ... and go through their expected friendship arc. None of it manages to work up much lather."
