= Thom Thomas =

American dramatist

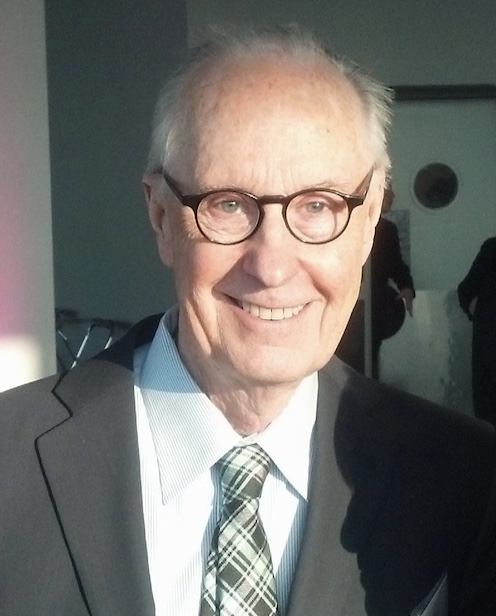
- Born: August 31, 1935
- Died: December 2, 2015 (aged 80)

Thomas Thomas (August 31, 1935 – December 2, 2015) was an American actor, screenplay writer and playwright.

== Formative years and family ==
Thomas Neil Thomas was born in Lawrence, Pennsylvania on August 31, 1935. He studied at the Pittsburgh Playhouse School of Theatre from 1958 to 1960 before attending Carnegie Mellon University.

On July 2, 2014, he married Janis V. Purins, with whom he had been living as domestic partners since they met at the Pittsburgh Playhouse in 1973.

== Career ==
Thomas began his career in theatre at Little Lake Theatre in Canonsburg, Pennsylvania, where he acted in or directed thirty plays from 1958 to 1964. In 1965, he served as the co-producer and director at The Rabbit Run Theatre in Madison, Ohio and later at The Odd Chair Playhouse in Bethel Park, Pennsylvania.

In 1966, he joined the American Conservatory Theater, where he worked under the artistic direction of William Ball. He then received the Cameron Overseas Grant from CMU to study in Europe where he joined the Young Vic.

Upon returning to America in 1967, he joined the faculty at Point Park College in Pittsburgh, where he led the theatre department from 1974 to 1977. He was appointed as the artistic director at the Pittsburgh Playhouse and was also the artistic director for the Pittsburgh Civic Light Opera in 1972, where he directed the entire inaugural season at newly restored Heinz Hall.

In 1974, he was honored as "Man of the Year in Theatre" by the Pittsburgh, Pennsylvania Jaycees.

He has been the author of a number of screenplays, including episodes for Hotel, Hill Street Blues and A Year in the Life. He wrote and co-produced the pilot for the proposed series "Private Sessions" starring Mike Farrell and Maureen Stapleton.

== Final years and death ==
In November 2015, Thomas collaborated with Iris Rainer Dart on rewrites for the stage musical, Beaches, based on Dart's popular novel. He also made final edits on his screenplay, Vanished, which was adapted from the novel by Mary McGarry Morris.

During this same time, he was diagnosed with acute myeloid leukemia and died within two weeks. Thomas had been the recipient of multiple grants, including from the Ford Foundation (1969) and the National Endowment for the Arts (1978).

== Plays ==
The Interview, his first major play, was produced with Jose Ferrer as director and actor at the Pittsburgh Playhouse. In 1976, The Interview was produced Off-Broadway. His other plays included The Ball Game, which premiered at Playwrights Horizons and later opened at the Open Space Theatre in London, England, and Without Apologies, which premiered at The Pittsburgh Playhouse and later at the Dorset Theatre Festival directed by Edgar Lansbury, and which subsequently moved to a successful off-Broadway production at the Hudson Guild Theatre, starring Carrie Nye and Pauline Flanagan. Both "The Interview" and "Without Apologies" were published by Samuel French, Inc.

A Moon To Dance By was a play that was first shown at the New Harmony Theatre, Evansville, Indiana in 2004, starring Jana Robbins and, after revision, in 2009 with Jane Alexander at the Pittsburgh Playhouse. It was also later performed at the George Street Playhouse in New Brunswick, New Jersey. Both productions were directed by Edwin Sherin. Based on an actual meeting between Frieda Weekley and her estranged son Monty at the ranch, she shared with her lover after the death of her husband D. H. Lawrence in 1939, the play examines the dynamics of a meeting between a mother who follows her own calling and the needs imposed on her by family and conventions. Named "Best Play, Best Ensemble, Best Actress, and Best Actor" in 2009 by The Pittsburgh Post-Gazette, it was nominated by the American Theatre Critics Association as "Best Play" and was also nominated for the 2009 Pulitzer Prize in Drama.

A member of the Dramatists Guild of America, the Academy of Television Arts and Sciences, and Writers Guild of America West, Thomas was also the co-writer (2012) along with novelist Iris Rainer Dart of a Broadway musical, Beaches, based on Dart's popular novel and film. It premiered at the Signature Theatre in Arlington, Virginia in February 2014.
