= Artie Butler =

American arranger and composer (born 1942)

- Born: Arthur Butler; December 2, 1942 (age 83); Brooklyn, New York, U.S.
- Genre: Popular music
- Occupations: Composer, arranger, songwriter, session musician
- Instrument: Keyboards
- Years active: 1957–present
- Website: artiebutler.com

Arthur Butler (born December 2, 1942) is an American arranger, composer, songwriter, and session musician. In a long career, he has been involved in numerous hit records and other recordings, and has been awarded over 60 gold and platinum albums.

== Life and career ==
Butler was born in Brooklyn, New York, and learned to play various instruments including piano, clarinet and drums as a child. He attended Erasmus Hall High School. At the age of 13, he auditioned for Henry Glover of King Records, who offered him a contract as a result. His single, "Lock, Stock and Barrel", credited to Arthur Butler, was issued on the DeLuxe label in 1957, but was not successful.

By the early 1960s he was working as an assistant at Bell Sound Studios in New York City, where he met songwriters and record producers Jerry Leiber and Mike Stoller. He began working for them in the Brill Building, initially as a pianist and then as an arranger. He contributed to records by The Drifters and others before, in 1963, arranging his first hit, "Sally Go 'Round the Roses" by The Jaynetts, on which he claims to have played all the instruments except guitar. He co-wrote Alvin Robinson's "Down Home Girl" with Leiber (quickly covered in 1965 by The Rolling Stones), and later in 1964 joined the team working with songwriters Jeff Barry and Ellie Greenwich. He arranged and contributed keyboards to several hits on Red Bird Records, including The Shangri-Las' "Leader of the Pack" and "Remember (Walking in the Sand)", The Dixie Cups' "Chapel of Love," and The Ad Libs' "The Boy from New York City." He also arranged Neil Diamond's early releases, including "Solitary Man" and "Cherry, Cherry," and Janis Ian's "Society's Child".

In 1967 he moved to Los Angeles. The following year he started work for A&M Records, where he worked with jazz musicians including Herbie Hancock, and contributed keyboards on Joe Cocker's hit "Feelin' Alright". He then went freelance, and suggested to Louis Armstrong that he should record the song "What a Wonderful World". Armstrong agreed, and Butler arranged and recorded the song with Armstrong despite the opposition of ABC Records President Larry Newton. From the 1970s onwards, Butler arranged many commercially successful records, including The Raiders' "Indian Reservation", Vicki Lawrence's "The Night The Lights Went Out In Georgia", Neil Sedaka's "Laughter in the Rain", Barry Manilow's "Copacabana", and Dionne Warwick's "I'll Never Love This Way Again". In 1987 he co-wrote, with lyricist Phyllis Molinary, "Here's to Life", intended for and first performed by Peggy Lee, but first recorded in 1990 by Shirley Horn and later by Barbra Streisand. He has been awarded over 60 gold and platinum albums during his career.

In the 1970s he began working on films, creating the scores for The Love Machine (1971), What's Up Doc? (1972), The Harrad Experiment (1973), the TV movie Wonder Woman (1974), For Pete's Sake (1974), Rafferty and the Gold Dust Twins (1975), the Disney film The Rescuers (1977), Sextette (1978), Sultan and the Rock Star (1980), and O'Hara's Wife (1982). In 1992, he was nominated for an Emmy award for the CBS miniseries Sinatra. In 2004 he worked with Mike Stoller on a stage musical, Laughing Matters, which premiered in New York in 2006, and in 2011 worked again with Stoller and lyricist Iris Rainer Dart on the musical The People in the Picture.

== Discography ==
Albums and Soundtracks
Year	Title	Notes	Label
1968	Have You Met Miss Jones?		CTI Records
1970	The Original Cleanhead	With Eddie "Cleanhead" Vinson	BluesTime
1973	The Harrad Experiment	Soundtrack for film by Ted Post	Capitol Records
2011	The People in the Picture	Broadway production alongside Mike Stoller	N/A

Singles and EPs
Year	Title	Notes	Label
1963	Sweet September / Freedom	With Alan Lorber	20th Century Fox Records
1963	Theme From "The Cardinal" / Waltz for J. & M.		20th Century Fox Records
1964	Thème Du Film "Le Cardinal"	French release of his previous two records	20th Century Fox Records
1967	Ode to Billie Joe / Soul Brother	Produced by Ted Cooper	Epic
1968	Max's Brasilian What / Something Stupid		CTI Records
1971	Feelin' Alright / Alice In Wonderland	Produced by Charles Stern	Verve Records
1971	The White Fox	Produced by Neely Plumb	Scepter Records
