= Lucita Covera =

American dancer

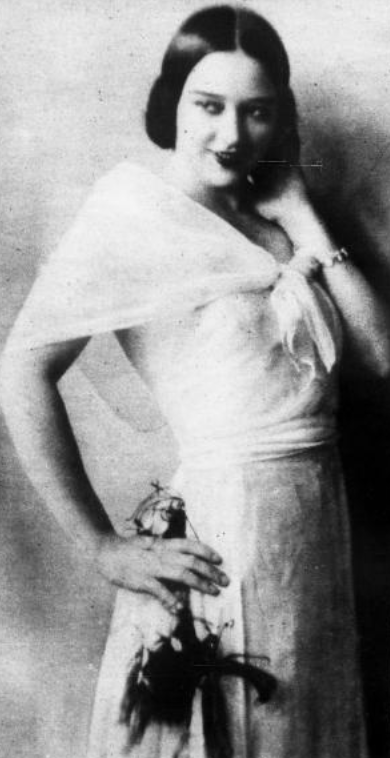
- Lucita Covera, from a 1924 publication
- Born: Lucetta Reynolds; December 8, 1895; California, U.S.
- Died: July 1979; New Orleans, Louisiana, U.S.
- Other names: Lucita Corvera, Lucita Corbera, Lucita Hall, Lucita Ward
- Occupation: Dancer

Lucita Covera (December 8, 1895 – July 1979), born Lucetta Reynolds, sometimes seen as Lucita Corvera Hall or Lucita Ward, was an American dancer in Broadway shows and other revues. She was described as the "Most Perfect Girl" in publicity.

== Early life ==
Though she was billed as a "Famous Spanish Dancing Star", and said to be from Barcelona, or Madrid, or Mexico, or Argentina, Lucetta Reynolds was the daughter of Mrs. F. A. Goble of Crescent Mills, California. She danced at local events in childhood.

== Career ==
Covera started her stage career in San Francisco. In her early years, she had a hula act, a nautch act, and played a Zuni character in 1921. Her stage credits as a dancer include appearances in Let's Go (1921), Sun-Kist (1921), Vogues of 1924, Artists and Models (1924), The Merry World (1926), and A Night in Paris (1926). "She is graceful and agile and has a pleasing personality," commented one reporter in 1922.

Covera's costumes were commented upon in print, her physique described as "the most perfect form", and she was said to have "the largest collection of jewels possessed by any actress on the stage today", including a set of "hair pendants" she wore for different dances. She endorsed a footcare product in newspaper advertisements in 1925. In 1929, she worked with Josephine Baker during her tour of South America.

In her later years, as Lucita Ward, she was an artist in New Orleans, selling her paintings to tourists in Jackson Square.

== Personal life ==
Lucetta Reynolds was married in 1914, to Clarence Stewart Hall. The Halls had a son, Howard Woodrow Hall, born in 1915, and they lived in Plumas County. The couple divorced in 1925. Her second husband was an Englishman named Ward. That marriage ended in 1954. Her son died in 1977, and she was listed among his survivors. She died by suicide in New Orleans in 1979, at age 84.
