= Majestic Theatre (Broadway) =

Broadway theater in Manhattan, New York

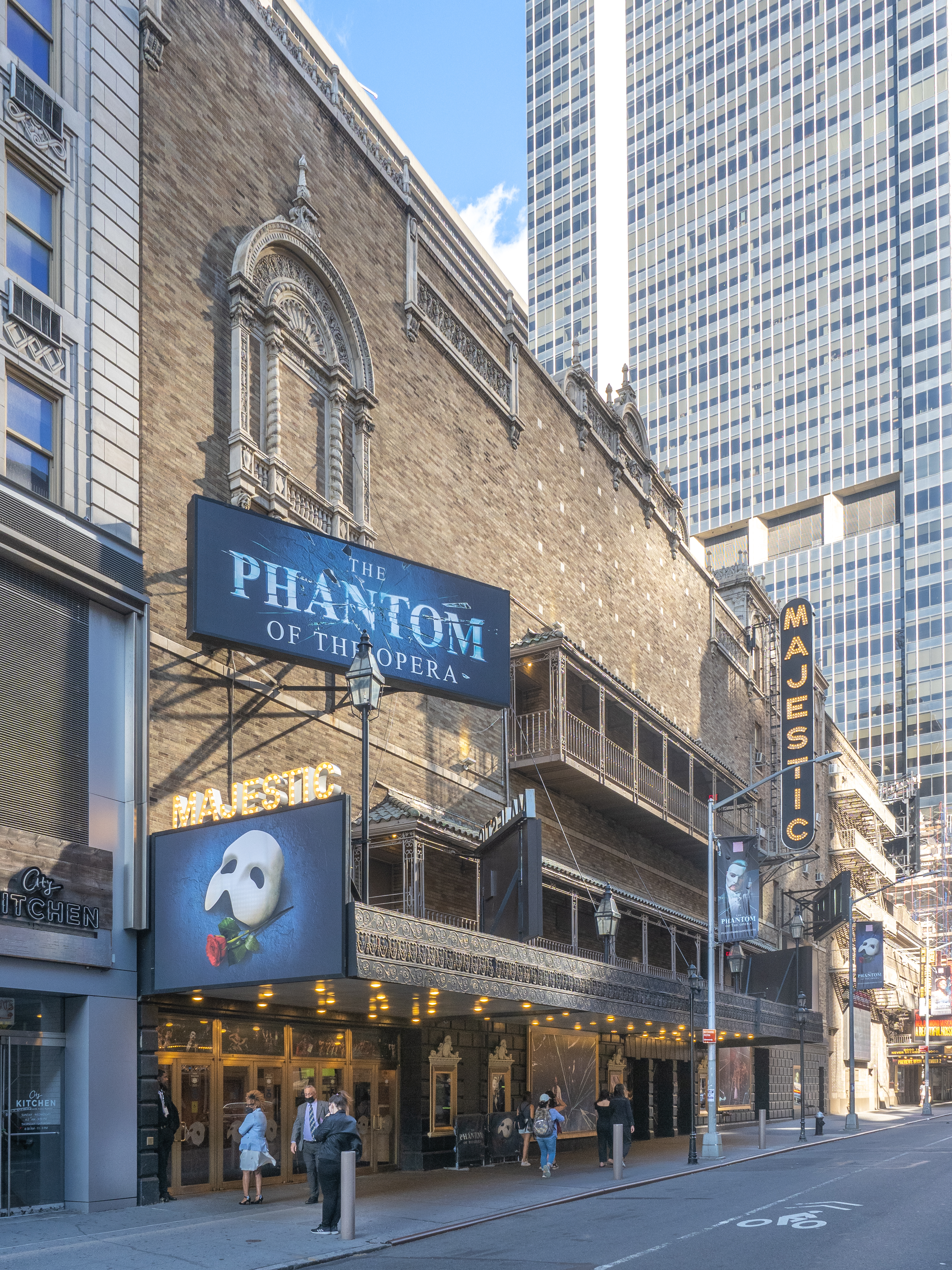
- Interactive map of Majestic Theatre
- Address: 245 West 44th Street; Manhattan, New York; United States
- Coordinates: 40°45′30″N 73°59′17″W
- Owner: Majestic Theatre LLC
- Operator: The Shubert Organization
- Capacity: 1,681
- Type: Broadway
- Public transit: Subway: Times Square–42nd Street/Port Authority Bus Terminal

Construction
- Opened: March 28, 1927 (99 years ago)
- Years active: 1927–present
- Architect: Herbert J. Krapp

Website
- shubert.nyc/theatres/majestic/

New York City Landmark
- Designated: December 8, 1987
- Reference no.: 1355
- Designated entity: Facade

New York City Landmark
- Designated: December 8, 1987
- Reference no.: 1356
- Designated entity: Lobby and auditorium interior

The Majestic Theatre is a Broadway theater at 245 West 44th Street in the Theater District of Midtown Manhattan in New York City, New York, U.S. Opened in 1927, the theater was designed by Herbert J. Krapp in a Spanish style and was built for real-estate developer Irwin S. Chanin. It has 1,681 seats across two levels and is operated by The Shubert Organization. Both the facade and interior are New York City landmarks.

The facade is designed in a Spanish style with golden brick, terracotta, and stone and is divided into two sections. The western portion of the facade contains the theater's entrance, with fire-escape galleries and a terracotta pediment above. The eastern portion is the stage house and is topped by archways. The auditorium contains Adam style detailing, steep stadium seating at the orchestra level, a large balcony, and an expansive plaster dome. Due to the slope of the seats, the rear of the orchestra is one story above ground. An interior leads to a large staircase, which connects to the rears of both the orchestra and the balcony. The balcony has extensive decoration, and there are also box seats near the front of the auditorium at balcony level.

The Majestic, Bernard B. Jacobs, and John Golden theaters, along with the Lincoln Hotel, were all developed by Chanin and designed by Krapp as part of a theater/hotel complex. The Shuberts have operated the Majestic since 1930. The Majestic was always intended as a venue for major musical theater productions because of its large size. Among the shows that premiered at the Majestic are Carousel, South Pacific, The Music Man, Camelot, A Little Night Music, and The Wiz. From 1988 to 2023, the theater housed The Phantom of the Opera, which was the longest-running production in Broadway history when it closed.

== Site ==
The Majestic Theatre is on 245 West 44th Street, on the north sidewalk between Eighth Avenue and Seventh Avenue, near Times Square in the Theater District of Midtown Manhattan in New York City, New York, U.S. The land lot is nearly rectangular, with a recess at the northwest corner. The lot covers 13,625 square feet (1,265.8 m^{2}), with a frontage of 140.5 feet (42.8 m) on 44th Street and a depth of 100.42 feet (31 m). The Majestic Theatre shares the city block with the Row NYC Hotel to the west. It adjoins six other theaters clockwise from north: the John Golden, Bernard B. Jacobs, Gerald Schoenfeld, Booth, Shubert, and Broadhurst. Other nearby structures include the Music Box Theatre and Imperial Theatre one block north; One Astor Plaza to the east; 1501 Broadway to the southeast; and Sardi's restaurant, the Hayes Theater, and the St. James Theatre to the south.

The Majestic is part of the largest concentration of Broadway theaters on a single block. The Majestic, Masque (Golden), and Royale (Jacobs) theaters and the Lincoln Hotel (Row NYC Hotel) had all been developed concurrently. The site of all four buildings had previously been occupied by twenty brownstone residences. The site was part of the Astor family estate from 1803 to 1922, when it was sold to Henry Claman. The plots collectively measured 200 feet (61 m) wide along Eighth Avenue, 240 feet (73 m) along 44th Street, and 250 feet (76 m) along 45th Street.

== Design ==
The Majestic Theatre was designed by Herbert J. Krapp in a Spanish style and constructed from 1926 to 1927 for the Chanin brothers. It was part of an entertainment complex along with the Lincoln Hotel and the Masque and Royale theaters, which Krapp also designed in a Spanish style. The Majestic was designed to be the largest theater in that complex, initially with about 1,800 seats. The Chanin Realty and Construction Company constructed all four structures. The Majestic is operated by the Shubert Organization.

=== Facade ===
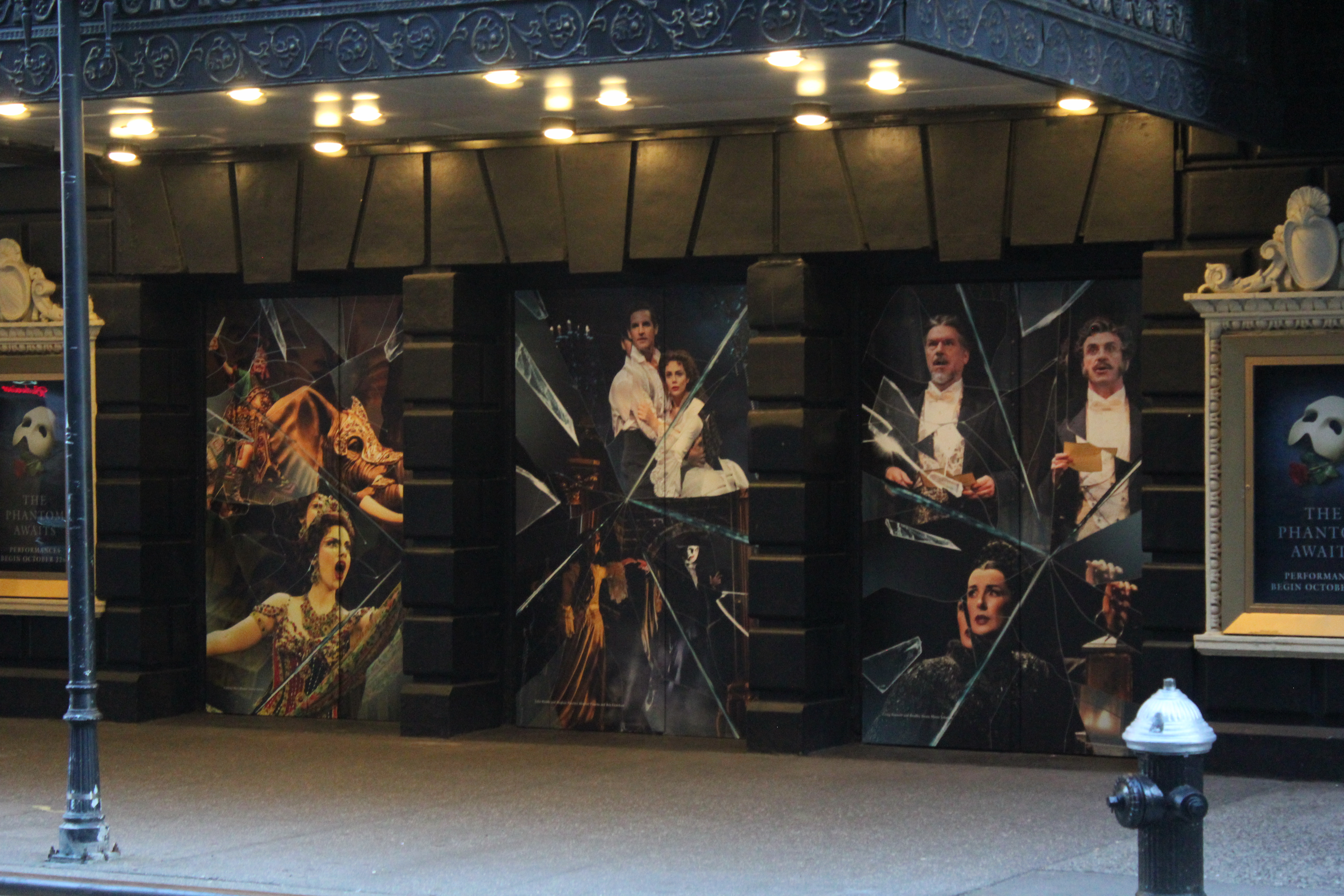
Entrances

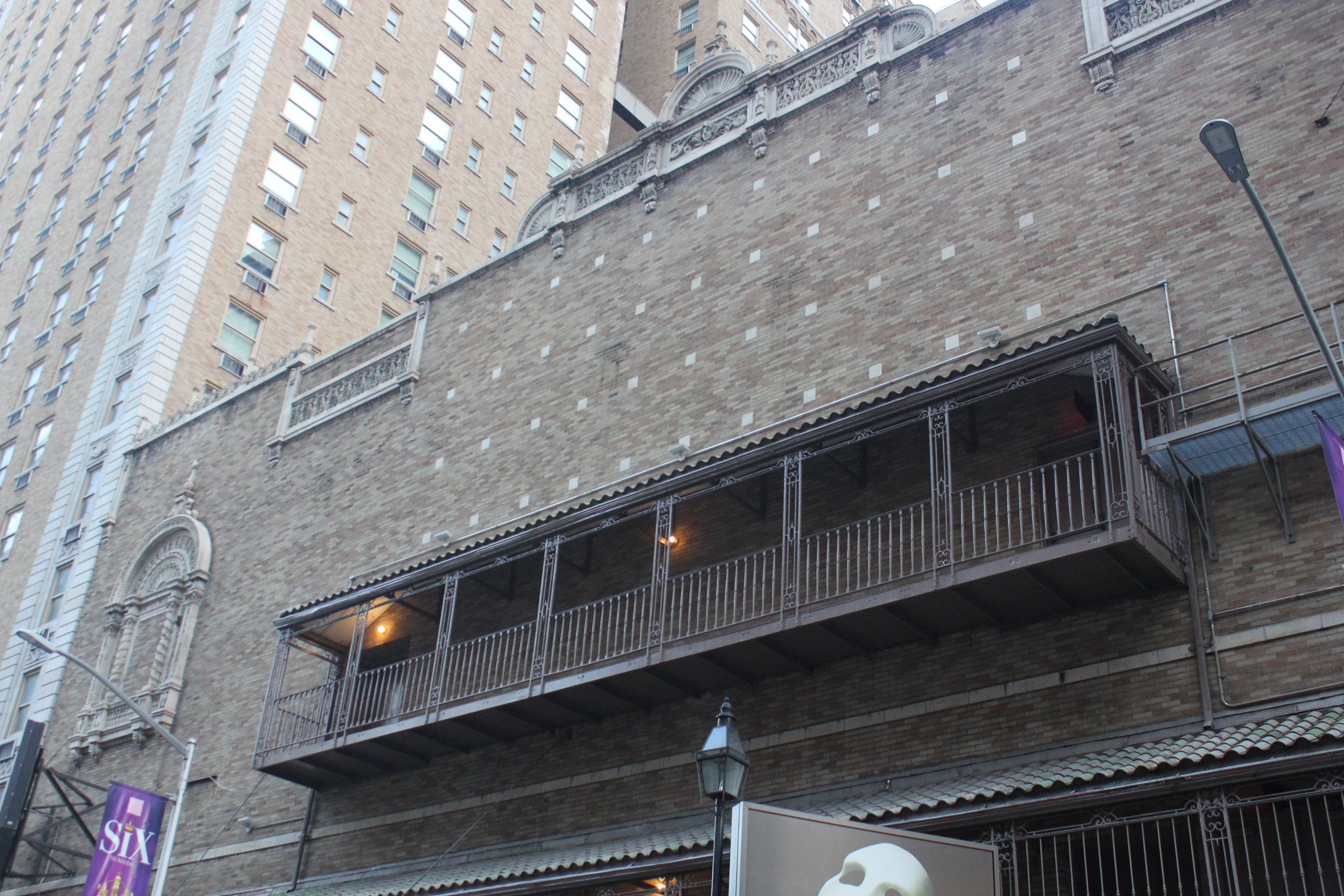
Fire escapes above the auditorium

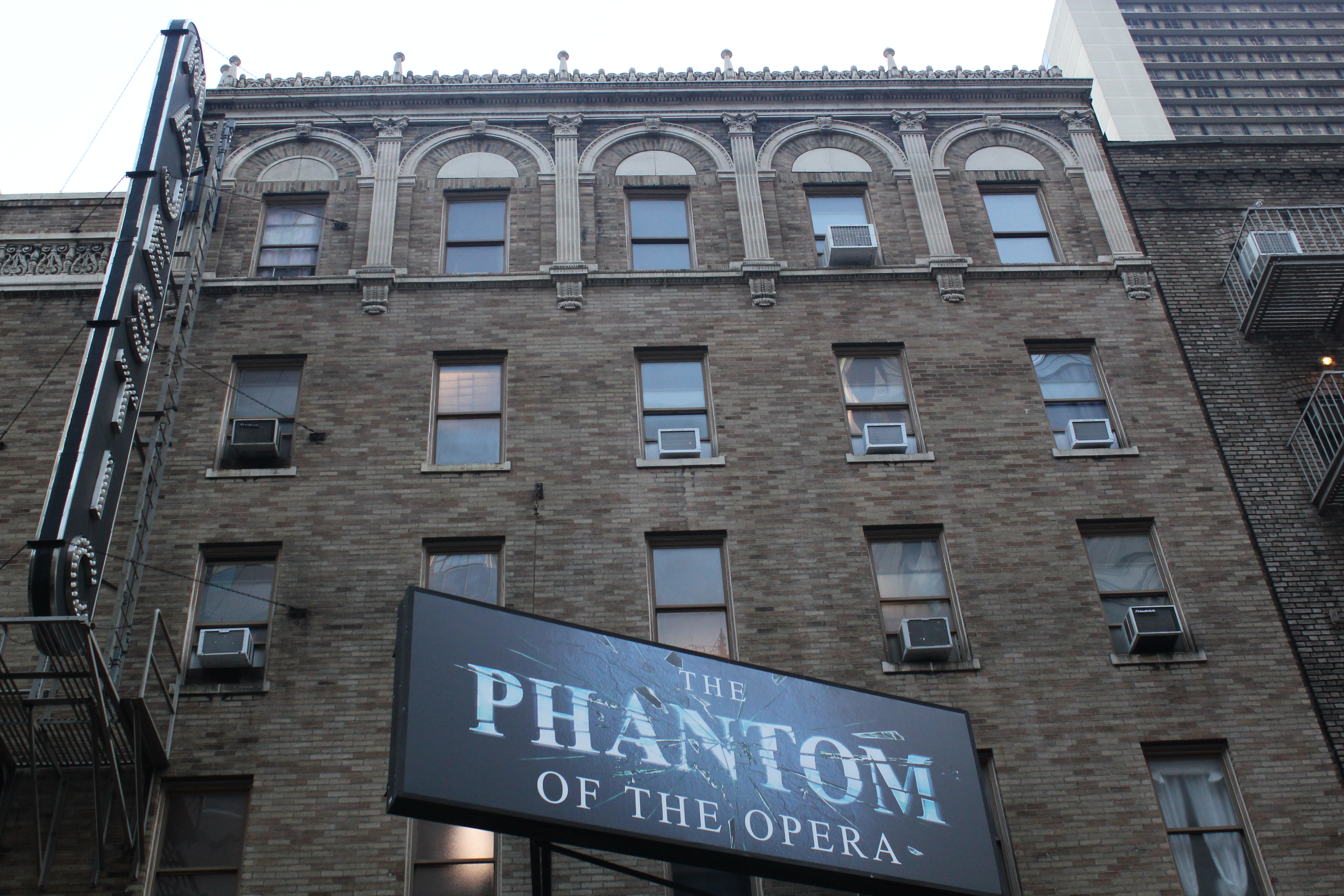
Upper stories of stage house

The facade contains two asymmetrical sections. The western section is wider and contains the auditorium entrance. The eastern section, which contains the stage house, is narrower and taller than the western section. In both sections, the ground floor is clad in rusticated blocks of terracotta, and the upper stories contain gold-colored, bonded Roman brick. The brick facade was designed to relate to the adjacent theaters and hotel. According to theatrical historian William Morrison, the facade of the Majestic was a more massive version of the combined facades of the Masque and Royale.

==== Auditorium section ====
At ground level, the auditorium entrance includes four pairs of glass and aluminum doors to the west and three pairs of metal emergency exit doors to the east. There are also two large, rectangular aluminum-framed sign boards and several smaller aluminum-framed signs with transoms. The entrance is topped by a cast-iron marquee. Above that is a sign advertising the production at the theater. Additional doors lead from the stage house portion of the facade. A wide ovolo band runs above the base. The stage door is not actually at the stage house but is instead next to the Golden Theatre.

On the upper stories, the auditorium section has two exterior galleries on the second and third floors, which serve as fire exits. The galleries contain wrought-iron frames and railings, which support metal canopies designed to resemble Spanish tile roofs. There is a terracotta band course above the lower gallery. The wall of the auditorium section above the upper gallery is laid in brick, with square pieces of terracotta; there are no windows. The upper left corner of the auditorium section, directly above the entrance, has a terracotta Palladian window with a blind opening, twisting columns, an arched tympanum, and a finial. Near the top of the auditorium facade are false balconettes, which consist of corbels supporting ornamental terracotta railings. The parapet of the auditorium facade contains a terracotta coping. The central part of the pediment has an ornamental finial, similar to that on the Jacobs Theatre.

==== Stage house section ====
The stage house has five sash windows per floor on the third through sixth stories. These windows contain sills made of terracotta, except at the third story, where a terracotta band course is below the windows. There is a large sign in front of the second story and another sign projecting from the third-story windows. At the sixth story, the windows are flanked by terracotta pilasters with Ionic-style capitals. Each of the sixth-story windows is topped by an arched tympanum, as well as an arched band with a keystone. A cornice and a parapet with finials run above the sixth story of the stage house.

=== Interior ===
Krapp designed the Majestic's interior in the style of the era of Louis XV, with an ivory and gold color scheme. The auditorium's orchestra level and balcony are both accessed from the same lobby. This layout was part of an effort by Irwin Chanin, one of the developers, to "democratize" the seating arrangement of the theater. For a similar reason, the Majestic was designed with a single balcony rather than the typical two since Chanin had perceived the second balcony to be distant. There was also a lounge in the basement, decorated in an English style.

The Chanin brothers wanted the three theaters' interior designs to be distinct while still adhering to a Spanish motif, in the belief that beautiful and comfortable theaters would be able to compete against other performing arts venues. However, the interior of the Majestic was designed in a different style than that of the exterior. By comparison, the interiors of the neighboring Royale and Masque were continuations of the "modern Spanish" facades of these theaters.

==== Lobby ====
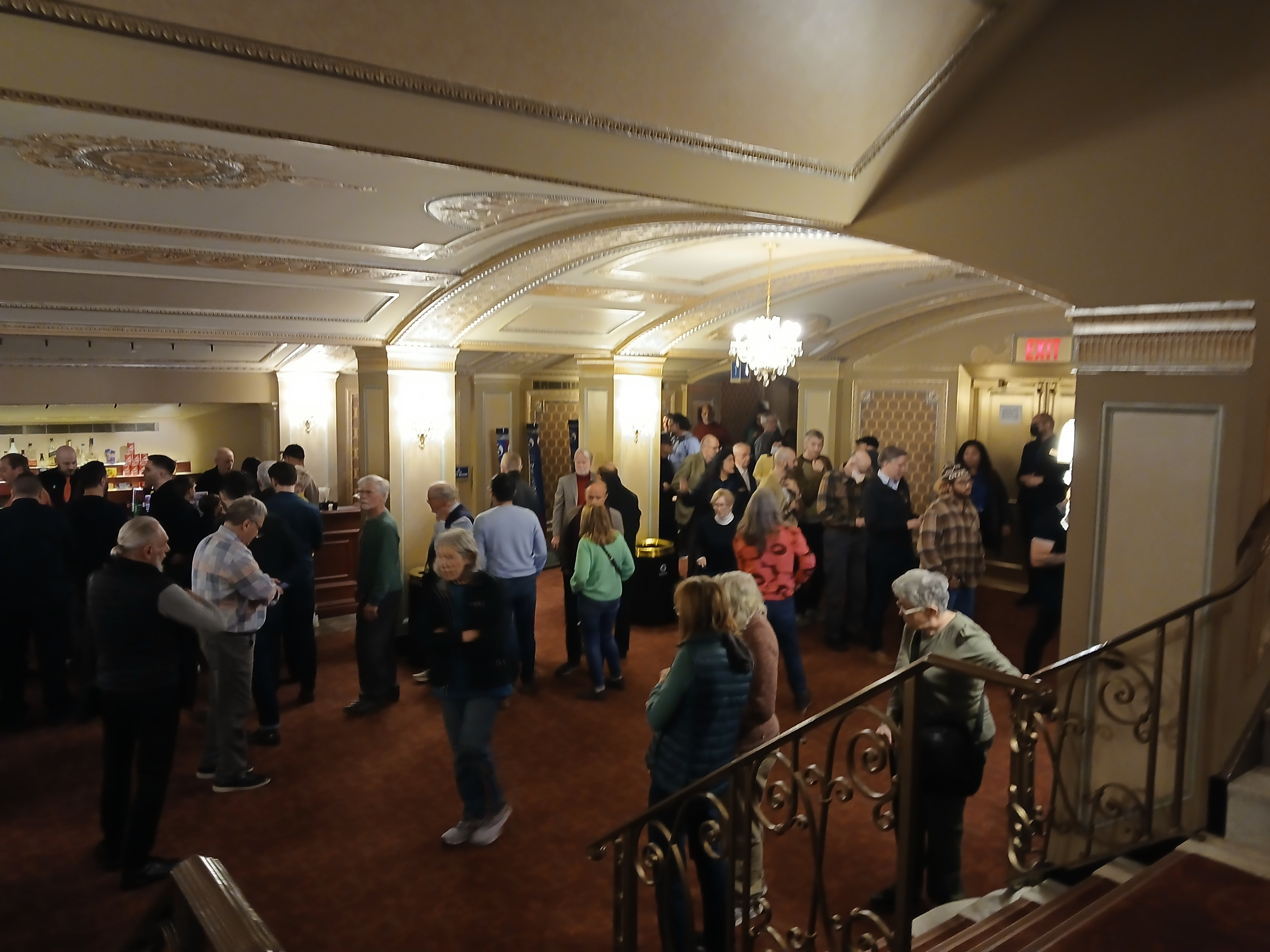
The entrance foyer

The ticket lobby, accessed from the western section of the theater building, contains three double doors that lead north to the entrance foyer. The entrance foyer is rectangular in plan and extends through the depth of the theater. The lower sections of the walls contain baseboards, above which is paneling delineated by moldings. These are separated by vertical piers with brass lighting sconces and decorated capitals. The eastern section of the entrance foyer contains a bar area behind a set of freestanding piers. The north wall has two service doors, and the south has three double doors from the ticket lobby. Two passageways lead to the front rows of seating in the auditorium. The vaulted ceiling contains molded wave and foliate motifs, which divide the ceiling into panels with Greek key moldings. Three of the panels have central medallions with cameo panels, and there are also chandeliers on the ceiling.

==== Stairs and halls ====
The west wall of the entrance foyer has a stone staircase with metal railings. It ascends to an intermediate landing and divides in two, connecting to the mezzanine at the rear of the orchestra. The side walls of the staircase include molded panels set between vertical panels with Adam-style reliefs of flowers within urns. The mezzanine, one story above the entrance foyer, contains a hallway surrounding the auditorium. The hallway's walls contain paneling, while the ceiling consists of a shallow vault with molded acanthus leaf ornaments and lighting fixtures. The hallway was originally decorated in a French style with corresponding furnishings.

The foyer staircase crosses the mezzanine hallway and continues to the balcony two stories above the entrance foyer. The balcony staircase contains wrought-iron railings and lighting sconces on the walls. The balcony staircase contains walls with alternating molded and flower/urn panels, and there are Corinthian-style capitals above the flower/urn panels. The ceiling of the staircase consists of a half-dome with vine and cameo panels.

==== Auditorium ====
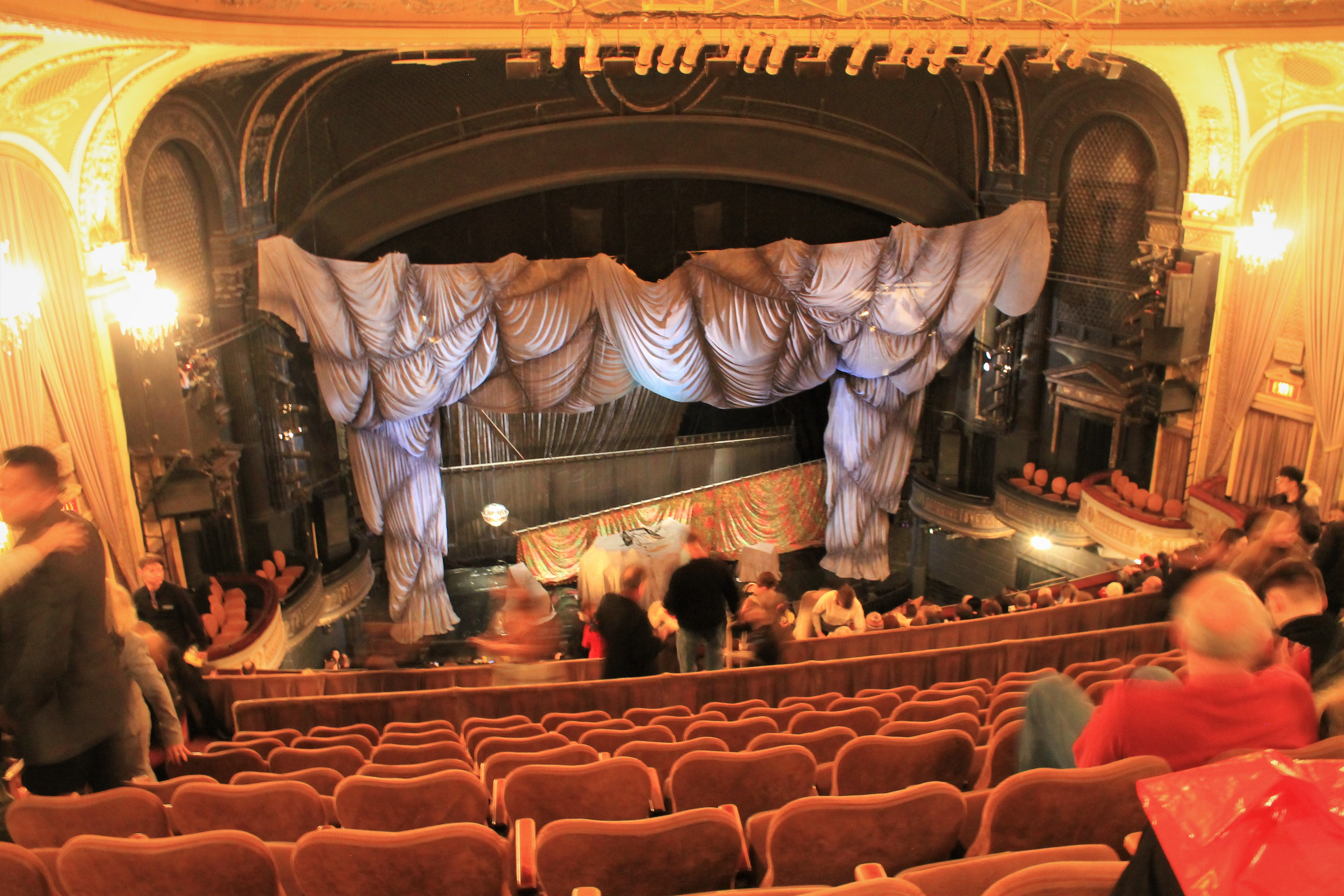
Auditorium

The auditorium has an orchestra level, one balcony, boxes, and a stage behind the proscenium arch. It is designed with plaster decorations in high relief. The Majestic is one of the larger Broadway theaters: according to the Shubert Organization, the auditorium has 1,681 seats, while according to The Broadway League, there are 1,645 seats. The discrepancy arises from the fact that there are 1,645 physical seats and 36 standing-only spots. The physical seats are divided into 885 seats in the orchestra, 292 at the front of the balcony, 436 at the rear, and 32 in the boxes. An article from 1927 noted that the theater had 1,800 seats, slightly wider than in typical Broadway theaters of the time. The auditorium was designed in a fan shape to give the impression of width, although it is actually narrower than other theaters with similar seating capacities.

===== Seating areas =====
The orchestra's rear (west) end contains a shallow promenade with doors on either end. The orchestra is raked, but the rear rows contain stadium seating that is more steeply sloped than the front rows. The rearmost row is actually at the mezzanine level above the entrance foyer. Halfway through the auditorium's length are exit doors on either side, connected by a wide aisle that separates the front and rear rows. The orchestra and its promenade contain walls with alternating molded and flower/urn panels. Above the paneling, and around the exit signs above the side doors, are moldings with vine decorations. There are brass wall sconces on the orchestra walls. The rearmost row in the orchestra's rear section has a decorative iron rail behind it, and another iron railing wraps around the front and sides. The front of the orchestra contains rusticated wall surfaces with rectangular openings, which contain staircases to the boxes.

The balcony level is similarly divided into front and rear sections by an aisle halfway across its depth. The rear rows contain paneled walls on the side and rear, similar to the panels at orchestra level. The front rows have arched panels on the side walls, which contain motifs of leaves and flowers. The walls originally had rose-and-gold damask panels. The arched panels are flanked by pilasters, whose capitals have reliefs of urns and caryatids. Above the arches are coved panels that curve onto the ceiling, with laurel-leaf moldings around them. The centers of the coved panels each contain a circle with latticework circumscribed by foliate motifs and swags. Brass wall sconces are mounted on the balcony walls, while chandeliers hang from the coved panels on the ceiling. The balcony has wide twisting-vine and talon moldings on its soffit, with light fixtures underneath. In front of the balcony are molded decorations.

On either side of the proscenium are four boxes on the balcony level, which step down toward the stage. The fronts of the first three boxes are shaped like semicircles, while the front of the last box is interrupted by the balcony's front. The boxes' front railings contain molded motifs of talons, waves, and laurel leaves; these motifs are interspersed with urns in arches and cameo panels with dancers. The undersides of the boxes contain molded bands and medallions with overhanging light fixtures. The second box on either side is placed within an arched wall panel; it has a rectangular doorway with a triangular pediment. Flanking the second box on each side are fluted columns, above which is an arched band with acanthus leaves, as well as a coved ceiling panel.

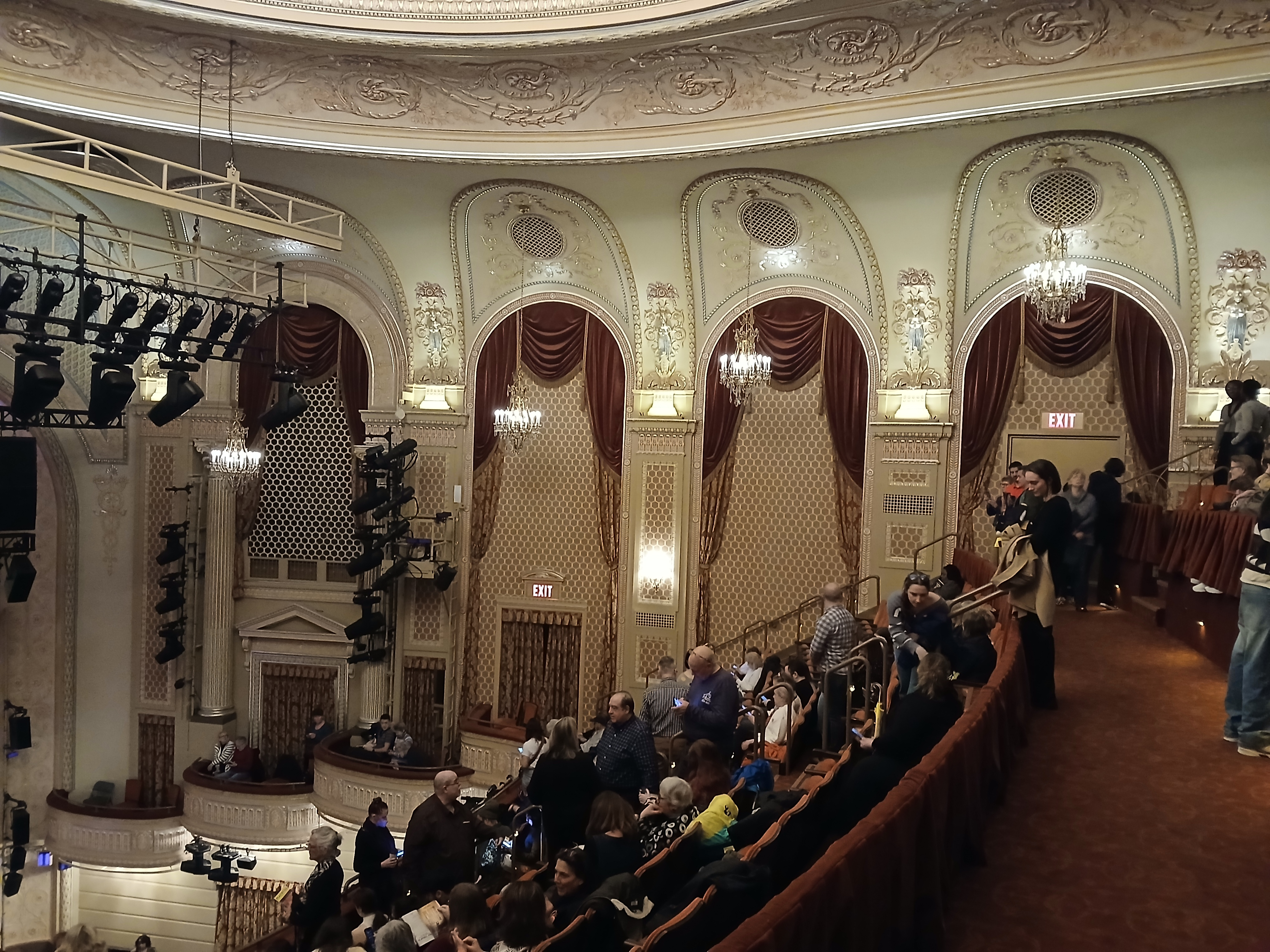
The right-hand wall of the auditorium

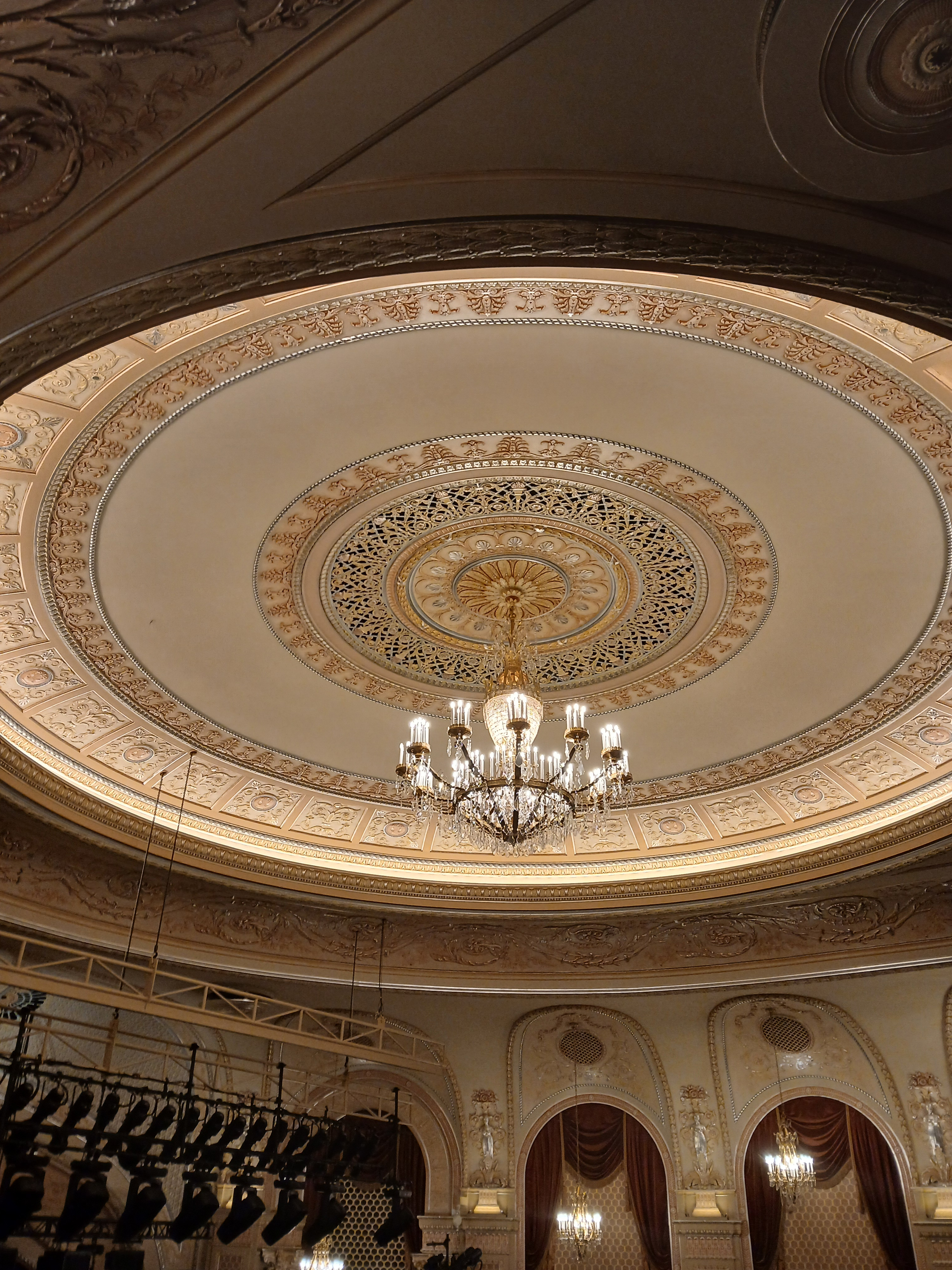
The central chandelier

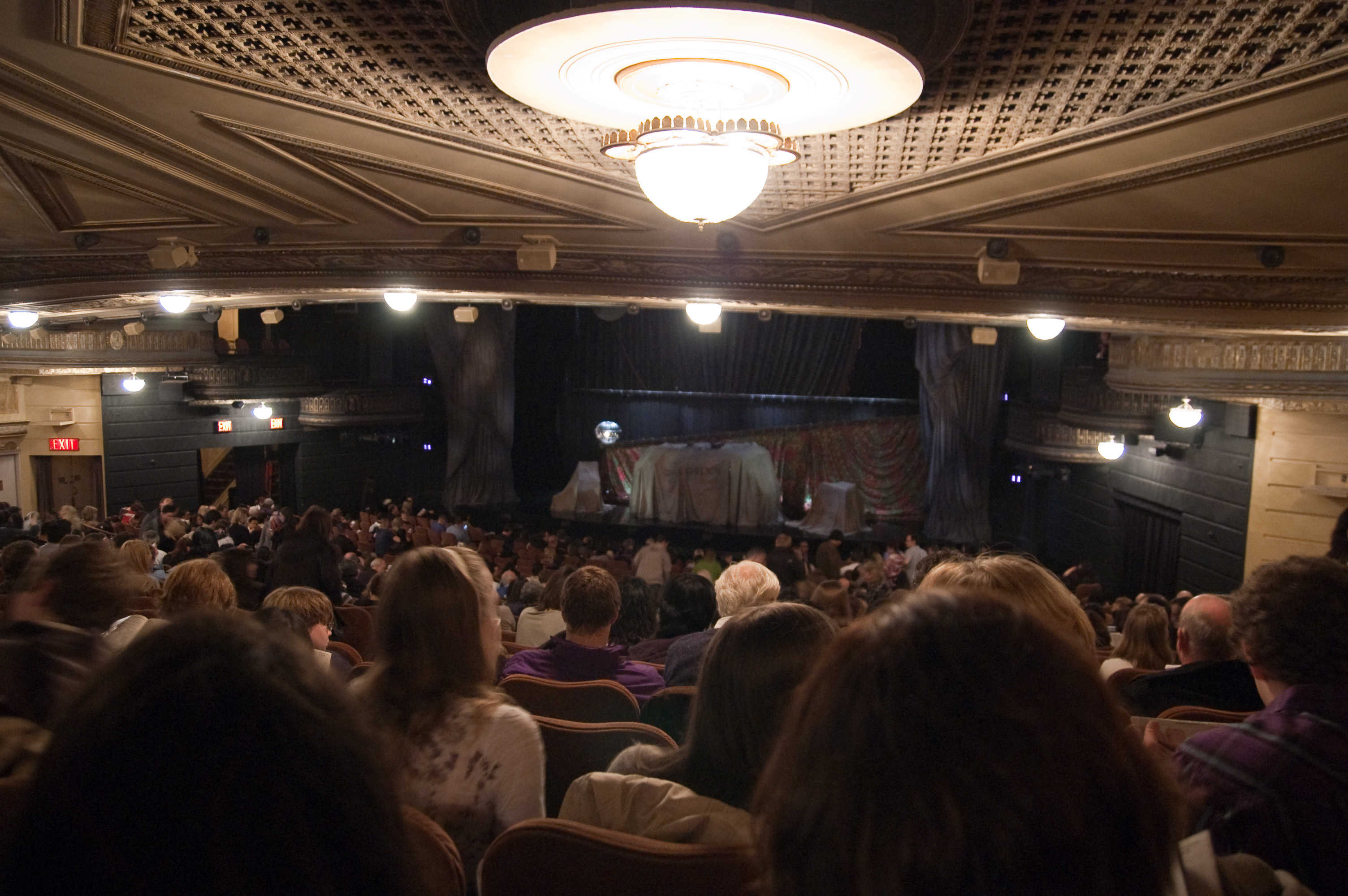
View underneath the balcony, at orchestra level

===== Other design features =====
Next to the boxes is a three-centered proscenium arch. The archway is surrounded by rope and talon moldings, above which is a laurel-leaf molding and a wide band with Adam-style flowers and vines. The proscenium measures about 30 feet 10 inches (9.40 m) high and 40 feet 10 inches (12.45 m) wide. For the production of The Phantom of the Opera, some holes were cut into the proscenium arch, and catwalks were installed about 31 feet (9.4 m) above the stage.

A sounding board curves onto the ceiling above the proscenium arch. The sounding board has a considerably sized elliptical relief of the goddess Venus in the center. On either side of the oval panel are curved panels with latticework and decorated perimeters. The ceiling has a dome surrounded by twisted vines. There are square panels along the dome's outer reveal, with cameos in some of these panels. The panels surround acanthus-leaf bands at the center.

== History ==
Times Square became the epicenter for large-scale theater productions between 1900 and the Great Depression. During the 1900s and 1910s, many theaters in Midtown Manhattan were developed by the Shubert brothers, one of the major theatrical syndicates of the time. The Chanin brothers developed another grouping of theaters in the mid-1920s. Though the Chanins largely specialized in real estate rather than theaters, Irwin Chanin had become interested in theater when he was an impoverished student at the Cooper Union. He subsequently recalled that he had been "humiliated" by having to use a separate door whenever he bought cheap seats in an upper balcony level. By October 1926, the Chanins had decided to construct and operate a theatrical franchise "in New York and half a dozen other large cities in the United States". Herbert Krapp had already designed the 46th Street, Biltmore, and Mansfield theaters for the Chanins in 1925 and 1926.

=== Development and early years ===
==== Chanin operation ====
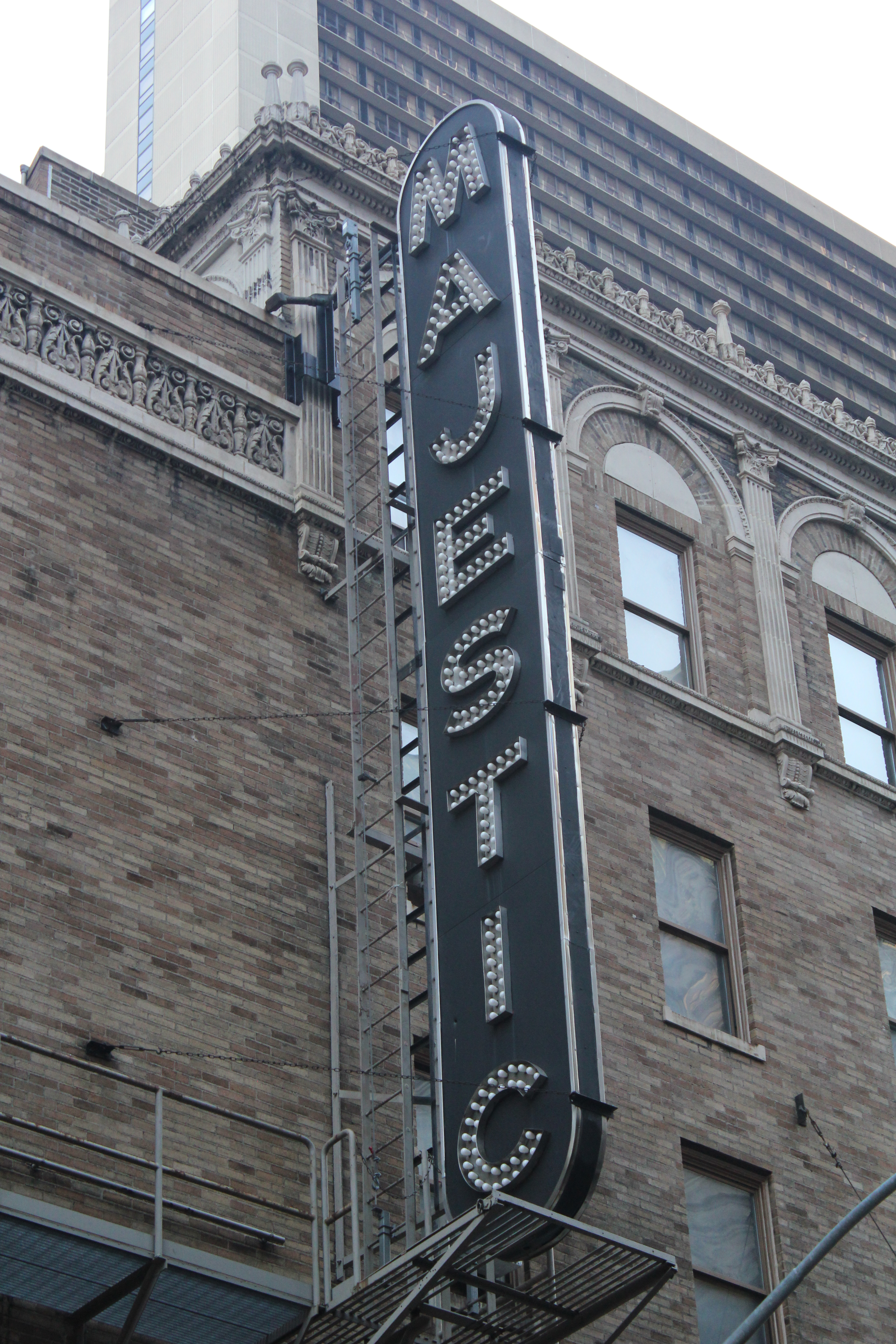
Sign on the theater building

The Chanin brothers had acquired the Klaman site in May 1925. The Chanins planned to build a hotel on Eighth Avenue and three theaters on the side streets. In March 1926, Krapp filed plans with the New York City Department of Buildings for the hotel and theaters, which were projected to cost $4.5 million. Local news media reported that there would be a large theater on 44th Street and a medium-sized theater and a small theater on 45th Street. (Note: Billboard magazine reported that the large and medium theaters would be on 44th Street, while the small theater would be on 45th Street.) The brownstones on the site were razed starting in May, and the site was cleared by the next month. That July, the Chanin brothers received a $7.5 million loan for the four developments from S. W. Straus & Co. Irwin Chanin launched a competition the same month, asking the public to suggest names for the three theaters. The names of the three theaters were announced in December 1926. The large theater became the Majestic; the mid-sized theater, the Royale; and the small theater, the Masque. The following month, the Chanins gave A. L. Erlanger exclusive control over bookings at the three new theaters and their five existing houses.

The Majestic Theatre opened on March 28, 1927, with the musical Rufus LeMaire's Affairs. The Majestic was the third and last theater to open in the Chanin development. (Note: The Royale had opened on January 11, 1927, and the Masque opened on February 24. The Chanin project was completed in January 1928 with the opening of the Lincoln Hotel.) The opening of the Majestic, Masque, and Royale signified the westward extension of the traditional Broadway theater district, as well as an expansion of the Chanins' theatrical developments. Each of the Chanin theaters was intended for a different purpose: the 1,800-seat Majestic for "revues and light operas", the 1,200-seat Royale for "musical comedies", and the 800-seat Masque for "intimate" plays. Despite these intentions, the Majestic also became popular for musical comedies soon after it opened. Rufus LeMaire's Affairs was a flop, closing after 56 performances. Later in 1927, the Majestic hosted the Black revue Rang Tang and a premiere of Love Call.

In its early years, the Majestic hosted several original productions that flopped, as well as more successful productions that were transferred from elsewhere. For example, notable original failures in 1928 included The Patriot with John Gielgud, running 12 performances, and The Big Fight with boxer Jack Dempsey, running 31 performances. By contrast, successful transfers of that year included Behold the Bridegroom, which had 88 total performances, and Rio Rita, which had nearly 600 total performances. In July 1929, the Shubert brothers bought the Chanin brothers' half-ownership stakes in the Majestic, Masque, and Royale theaters for a combined $1.8 million. In exchange, the Shuberts sold a parcel of land on the Upper West Side to the Chanins, who bought several adjacent lots and developed the Century apartment building there.

==== 1930s and early 1940s ====
After acquiring the Majestic in 1929, the Shuberts staged the revue Pleasure Bound, choreographed by Busby Berkeley, as well as the musical A Wonderful Night with music by Johann Strauss. The Majestic hosted several operettas in the early 1930s. Lew Leslie's International Revue with Gertrude Lawrence, Harry Richman, and Jack Pearl opened in 1930 at the then-exorbitant cost of $200,000, but it closed after only three months. The Majestic also hosted Artists and Models, as well as the operetta Nina Rosa with Ethelind Terry, the same year. The Student Prince flopped in 1931, and the Majestic remained dark for several months. During 1933, the Majestic hosted Pardon My English; Ray Henderson and Lew Brown's Strike Me Pink; and a transfer of Earl Carroll's Murder at the Vanities. The following year, impresario S. M. Chartock presented a season of Gilbert and Sullivan works, with a rotation of five productions.

The Shuberts were experiencing financial problems by then, and following a foreclosure proceeding, the Shuberts leased the Majestic and Masque in September 1934. The Moscow Art Players performed eight Russian plays in repertory for a month in early 1935. Otherwise, most of the Majestic's productions in 1935 were failures, except for Earl Carroll's Sketchbook. Chartock again leased the Majestic in 1936 for another season of Gilbert and Sullivan works. The Broadway theater industry declined during the Great Depression, and the Majestic, Masque, and Royale were auctioned in November 1936 to satisfy a $2 million mortgage against the theaters. A representative of the Shubert family bought the rights to operate the theaters for $700,000, but the Bankers Securities Corporation retained a half interest. In 1937, the Majestic saw little success with revivals of The Bat and The Cat and the Canary, but the original production of the operetta Three Waltzes had a longer run of 122 performances.

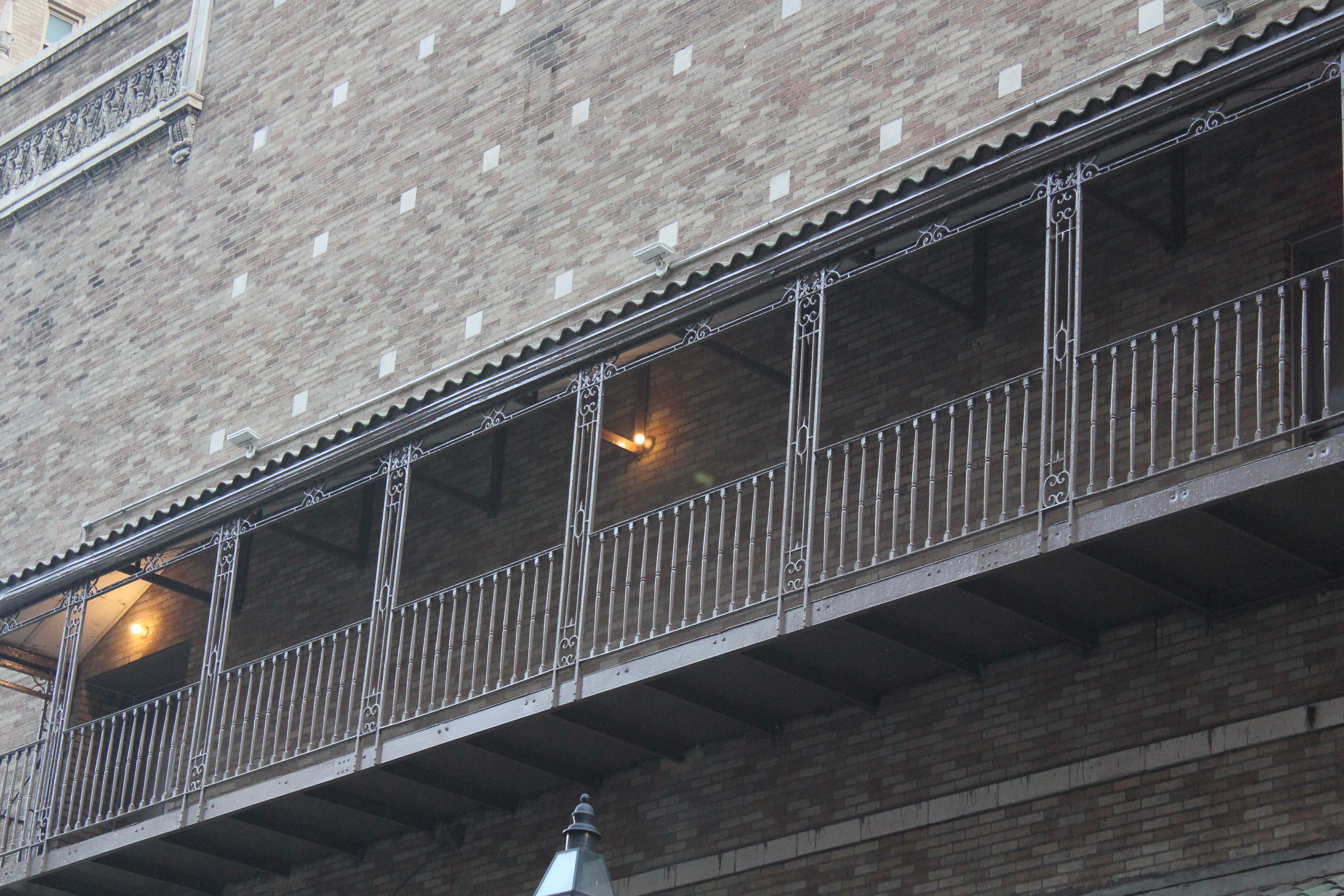
Fire exit gallery outside the Majestic

In the late 1930s, many long-running productions from other theaters were transferred to the Majestic to complete their runs there, including Susan and God in 1938. The musical Stars in Your Eyes premiered at the Majestic in 1939, followed by a longer run of Yokel Boy the same year. Long-running transfers from other theaters continued into the next decade, including Margin for Error in 1940 and Hellzapoppin in 1941. The Majestic hosted a revival of Porgy and Bess in 1942, which ran nearly 300 performances, as well as Native Son, a Black drama that Lee Shubert unsuccessfully attempted to close prematurely. This was followed in 1943 by yet another long-running transfer, Junior Miss, as well as the original The Merry Widow, which had 321 performances. A relocation of the musical Mexican Hayride played at the Majestic in 1944.

=== Later Shubert operation ===
==== Late 1940s to 1960s ====
The Shubert brothers bought the Majestic, Masque (by then renamed the John Golden), and Royale theaters from the Bankers Securities Corporation in 1945, giving the family full ownership of these theaters. After Rodgers and Hammerstein presented four musicals at the Majestic in the 1940s and 1950s, the theater became known as a preferred venue for the duo's musicals, along with the neighboring St. James. The first of these, Carousel, opened in 1945 and ran 890 performances, though its revival in 1949 flopped. The long-running Harold Rome musical Call Me Mister transferred to the Majestic in 1947, and the American Repertory Theater showed Alice in Wonderland the same year. Rodgers and Hammerstein's Allegro also opened in 1947 running 315 performances despite a negative reception from theatrical critics. Much more positively received was South Pacific, with 1,925 performances over the next four years. The final Rodgers and Hammerstein production of this era was Me and Juliet, which ran 358 performances even though theatrical critics saw it as mediocre.

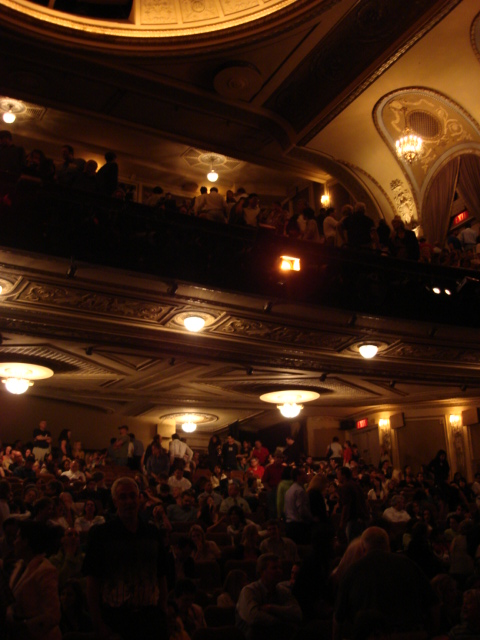
View of the interior as seen from the orchestra level

The Majestic hosted numerous long-running musicals for the rest of the 1950s, though these were met with varying reception. By the Beautiful Sea, starring Shirley Booth, was moderately received upon its opening in 1954, staging 268 performances. David Merrick's Fanny, with Ezio Pinza and Walter Slezak, was even more successful when it opened later that year, ultimately running 888 times. Next to open was Happy Hunting in 1956, which saw an extensive run of 412 performances. This was followed the next year by Meredith Willson's hit The Music Man, which featured Robert Preston, Barbara Cook, and David Burns and ultimately ran 1,375 performances. Alan Jay Lerner and Frederick Loewe's musical Camelot opened in 1960 with Julie Andrews, Richard Burton, and Robert Goulet. Despite initial setbacks, Camelot eventually ended with 873 performances.

Camelot was followed by The School for Scandal in 1963, as well as several high-profile flops. In 1963 alone, these included Hot Spot, featuring Judy Holliday's last Broadway appearance; a transfer of Tovarich, with Vivien Leigh and Jean Pierre Aumont; and Jennie, with Mary Martin. This was followed in 1964 by Anyone Can Whistle with Lee Remick, Angela Lansbury, and Harry Guardino, which managed just nine performances before closing. Another hit came later that year with Golden Boy. During the run of Golden Boy, the benefit concert Broadway Answers Selma was held at the Majestic on April 4, 1965, to raise funds for the civil rights movement following the Selma to Montgomery marches. A transfer of the hit Funny Girl was staged at the Majestic in 1966, as well as Breakfast at Tiffany's, which closed after only four previews. Closing out the 1960s was a transfer of Fiddler on the Roof, which ran from 1967 to December 1970.

==== 1970s and 1980s ====
The first production to open at the Majestic in the 1970s, the musical Lovely Ladies, Kind Gentlemen, flopped with just 19 performances. Next to be staged was the hit 1776, which was transferred to the Majestic in 1971. The musical Sugar, with Robert Morse, Tony Roberts, and Cyril Ritchard, opened in 1972 and had over 500 performances. This was followed the next year by a transfer of the musical A Little Night Music. The silent film-themed musical Mack & Mabel, with Robert Preston and Bernadette Peters, managed only 65 performances in 1974. Much more successful was the musical The Wiz, an adaption of The Wonderful Wizard of Oz with an all-Black cast, which opened at the Majestic in 1975 and transferred after two years. The Majestic also hosted a memorial to the producer Charles Weidman during 1975. After The Wiz was transferred, Liza Minnelli starred in The Act in 1977.

The Shuberts began restoring their Broadway theaters in 1978 with a renovation of the Majestic. The Majestic hosted several relatively short runs in the late 1970s and early 1980s. First Monday in October opened in 1978, featuring Henry Fonda and Jane Alexander, and the Michael Bennett musical Ballroom opened the same year. Opening in 1979 was I Remember Mama, which was both Richard Rodgers's last composition and Liv Ullmann's Broadway debut. The same year, the Majestic hosted the revival of The Most Happy Fella, as well as Bette Midler's solo show Bette! Divine Madness. In 1980, the long-running musical Grease was presented at the Majestic for the last five weeks of its run, followed by Harry Blackstone Jr.'s magic show Blackstone! and a moderately successful revival of Brigadoon. David Merrick's hit 42nd Street moved to the Majestic in 1981 and stayed there for several years.

The New York City Landmarks Preservation Commission (LPC) had started considering protecting the Majestic as a landmark in 1982, with discussions continuing over the next several years. The LPC designated the Majestic's facade and interior as a landmark on December 8, 1987. This was part of the LPC's wide-ranging effort in 1987 to grant landmark status to Broadway theaters. The New York City Board of Estimate ratified the designations in March 1988. The Shuberts, the Nederlanders, and Jujamcyn collectively sued the LPC in June 1988 to overturn the landmark designations of 22 theaters, including the Majestic, on the merit that the designations severely limited the extent to which the theaters could be modified. The lawsuit was escalated to the New York Supreme Court and the Supreme Court of the United States, but these designations were ultimately upheld in 1992.

==== The Phantom of the Opera ====
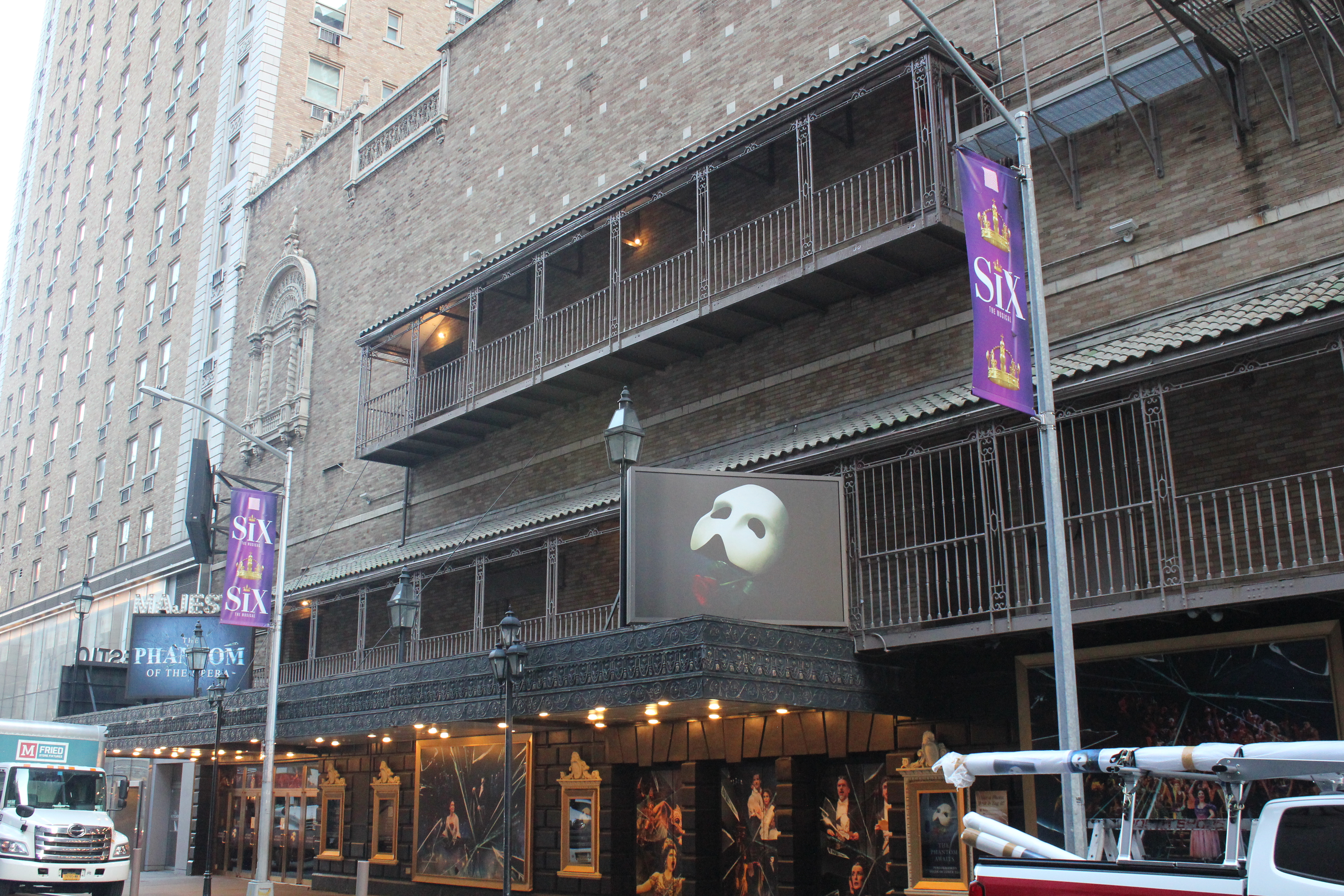
The auditorium entrance viewed from across the street

In March 1987, Shubert chairman Bernard B. Jacobs announced that the Andrew Lloyd Webber musical The Phantom of the Opera would be hosted at the Majestic, following negotiations with producer Cameron Mackintosh. 42nd Street was moved to the St. James the next month to make way for Phantom. Initially, Mackintosh was hesitant to relocate Phantom to the Majestic, citing the seating areas' dimensions, and was considering moving the musical to a competing theater. (Note: According to a New York Times article from December 1986, Mackintosh was considering hosting the musical at the Martin Beck Theatre (operated by Jujamcyn) or the Minskoff Theatre (operated by the Nederlanders). A Times article from March 1987 says that, before the Majestic Theatre was chosen, Mackintosh had considered the Nederlanders' Mark Hellinger Theatre in addition to the Martin Beck Theatre.) Mackintosh changed his mind after theatrical consultant Peter Feller, working with the Shuberts, suggested modifying the theater slightly to fit Phantom's set requirements. The Shuberts spent over $1 million on the modifications. The proscenium opening was enlarged, allowing audiences to see the musical's titular character. The roof was strengthened, supporting the weight of the falling chandelier used in the show. Finally, a pit was dug beneath the stage to accommodate scenery and set changes. After a record advance sale of $17 million, Phantom officially opened on January 26, 1988. The musical, which had been successful during its West End run in London, was also successful in its Broadway production. Phantom was still playing to full houses a year after its opening.

The Broadway run of Phantom played continuously at the Majestic through the end of the 1990s. In addition to Phantom, the Majestic hosted memorials such as those of Leonard Bernstein, Mary Martin, and Bernard B. Jacobs. The Majestic also hosted the 50th Tony Awards in 1996 on the set of Phantom. For Uta Hagen's 80th birthday in 1999, the Majestic staged a one-time reading of the play Who's Afraid of Virginia Woolf?, in which Hagen had starred. Phantom continued to be popular in the 21st century, and it became the longest-running show in Broadway history in 2006, surpassing the musical Cats. Between performances, the Majestic hosted memorials and tributes, such as those of Tony Randall, Cy Coleman, Kitty Carlisle, and Gerald Schoenfeld. As part of a settlement with the United States Department of Justice in 2003, the Shuberts agreed to improve disabled access at their 16 landmarked Broadway theaters, including the Majestic. The Shuberts sold 48,000 square feet (4,500 m^{2}) of unused air development rights above the Majestic to Tishman Realty in 2008, which were used for a nearby hotel, and the Shuberts sold a further 58,392 square feet (5,424.8 m^{2}) of air rights above the Majestic and Broadhurst in 2013. Phantom became the first Broadway musical in history to run for 10,000 performances on February 11, 2012. By April 2019, Phantom had been staged over 13,000 times.

The theater closed on March 12, 2020, due to the COVID-19 pandemic. It reopened on October 22, 2021, with performances of Phantom and a party outside the Majestic. The musical struggled to regain pre-pandemic attendance levels, grossing $850,000 to $1 million per week, which was not enough to cover the show's extremely high operating costs. As a result, its producers announced in September 2022 that the production would close on February 18, 2023, shortly after its 35th anniversary. Attendance surged after the announcement, with a record gross of $2.2 million on the week of November 21, 2022, and the closing date was extended to April 16, 2023. The musical set the Majestic's box-office record shortly before its closure, grossing $3,029,826 over eight performances in March 2023. Phantom had run for 13,981 performances at the time of its closure.

==== Mid-2020s to present ====
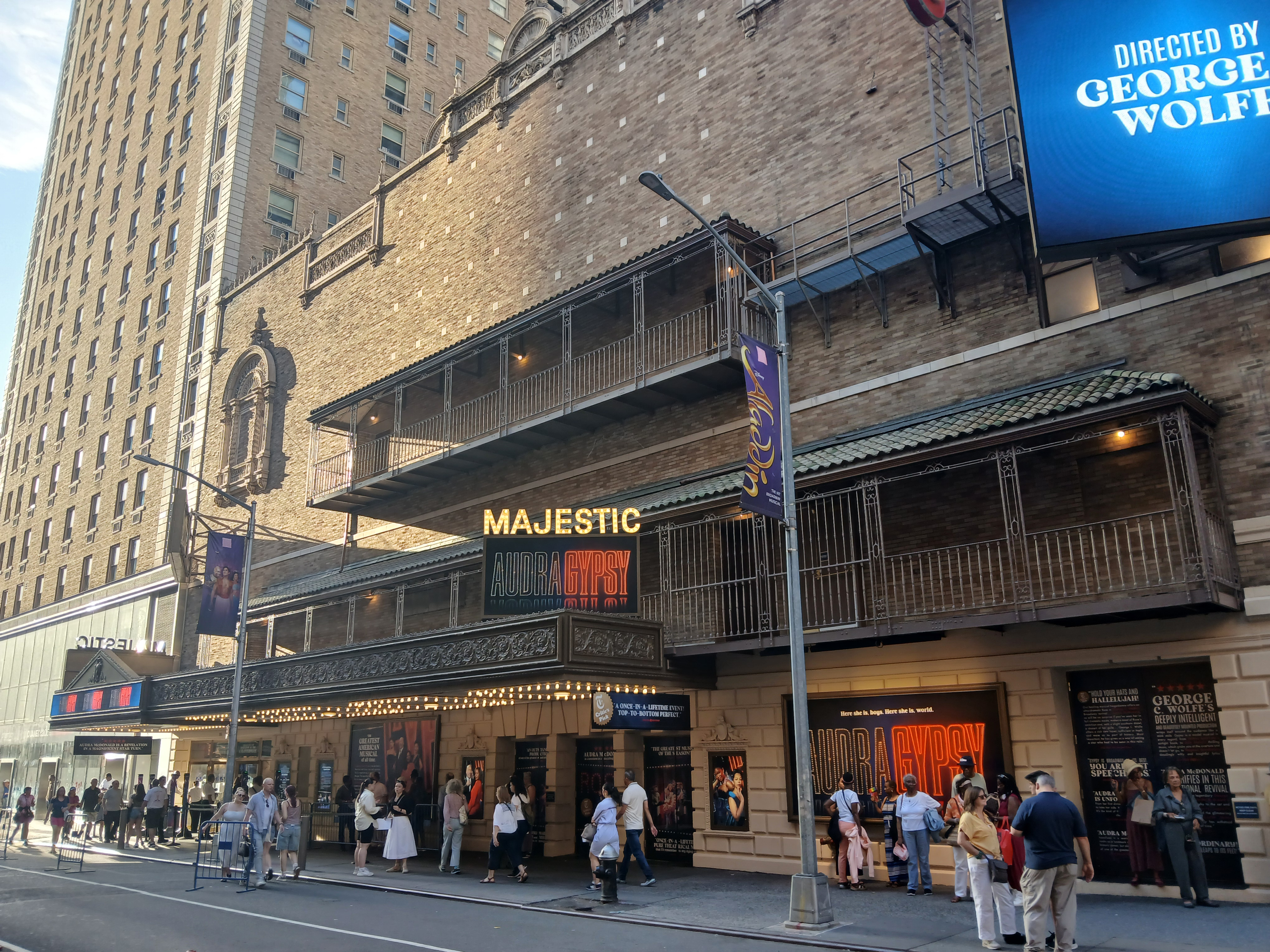
The Majestic Theatre seen in 2025, during the run of Gypsy

After Phantom closed, the vertical sign outside the Majestic was repainted from black to its original red. In mid-2024, the musical Gypsy starring Audra McDonald was scheduled as the theater's next production. It began previews at the Majestic on November 21, 2024, and officially opened on December 19. The production closed in August 2025 after running for 269 performances. Afterward, the theater hosted a one-night concert performance featuring the cast of the TV show Hazbin Hotel in October 2025. The musical Beaches opened at the theater in April 2026, closing a month later after 38 performances. Purple Rain is is scheduled to open at the Majestic in April 2027.

== Notable productions ==
Productions are listed by the year of their first performance.

Notable productions at the theater
Opening year	Name	Refs.
1927	Rang Tang	
1928	Rio Rita	
1930	Artists and Models	
1931	The Student Prince	
1931	Simple Simon	
1932	The Round Up	
1933	Pardon My English	
1933	The Bohemian Girl	
1933	The Pirates of Penzance	
1933	The Yeomen of the Guard	
1934, 1936	Gilbert and Sullivan Series (five productions)	(Note: In both 1934 and 1936, the Gilbert & Sullivan plays were performed in the following order: The Mikado; Pirates of Penzance; H.M.S. Pinafore in repertory with Trial by Jury; Iolanthe. The Mikado also performed after Iolanthe in 1934.)
1936	At Home Abroad	
1936	On Your Toes	
1937	The Masque of Kings	
1937	The Bat	
1937	The Cat and the Canary	
1937	Babes in Arms	
1940	Margin for Error	
1941	Hellzapoppin	
1942	Porgy and Bess	
1942	Native Son	
1943	Junior Miss	
1943	The Merry Widow	
1944	Mexican Hayride	
1945, 1949	Carousel	(Note: Carousel opened in both 1945 and 1949.)
1946	Oedipus Rex	
1947	The Mayor of Zalamea	
1947	Alice in Wonderland	
1947	Call Me Mister	
1947	Allegro	
1948	Inside U.S.A.	
1949	South Pacific	
1953	Me and Juliet	
1954	By the Beautiful Sea	
1954	Fanny	
1956	Happy Hunting	
1957	The Music Man	
1960	Camelot	
1963	The School for Scandal	
1963	Hot Spot	
1963	Tovarich	
1963	Jennie	
1964	Anyone Can Whistle	
1964	A Funny Thing Happened on the Way to the Forum	
1964	Golden Boy	
1966	Funny Girl	
1966	Breakfast at Tiffany's	(Note: Breakfast at Tiffany's never officially opened at the Majestic Theatre; it only played previews.)
1967	Marat/Sade	
1967	Fiddler on the Roof	
1970	Lovely Ladies, Kind Gentlemen	
1971	1776	
1972	Sugar	
1973	A Little Night Music	
1974	Mack & Mabel	
1975	The Wiz	
1977	The Act	
1978	First Monday in October	
1978	Ballroom	
1979	I Remember Mama	
1979	The Most Happy Fella	
1979	Bette! Divine Madness	
1980	Grease	
1980	Blackstone! The Magnificent Musical Magic Show	
1980	Brigadoon	
1981	42nd Street	
1988	The Phantom of the Opera	
2024	Gypsy	
2026	Beaches	

== See also ==
- List of Broadway theatres
- List of New York City Designated Landmarks in Manhattan from 14th to 59th Streets
