= Broadway Answers Selma =

1965 New York Broadway theater fundraiser for civil rights movement

- Fundraising benefit concert concert by Various singers
- Venue: Majestic Theatre, New York City, U.S.
- Date: 1965

Broadway Answers Selma was a fundraising benefit concert held at the Majestic Theatre on Broadway on 4 April 1965. It was held to raise funds for the civil rights movement in the aftermath of the Selma to Montgomery marches.

== History ==
The concert raised $150,000 (equivalent to $1,532,471 in 2025) for the civil rights organisations Southern Christian Leadership Conference (SCLC), Congress of Racial Equality (CORE) and the Student Nonviolent Coordinating Committee (SNCC) and other recipients. The Mayor of New York, Robert F. Wagner Jr., purchased the first ticket for the event. Ticket prices ranged from $5 to $1000. The concert aimed to raise money for the family of the Unitarian minister and activist James Reeb who was murdered while taking part in the marches. Reeb himself had been protesting the murder of Jimmie Lee Jackson; Reeb's death garnered far greater national attention than Jackson's death a few weeks before. Jackson's name was belatedly added to the list of beneficiaries after the concert. The four major civil rights organisations each earned $24,500 from the proceeds of the concert.

The concert was organised by the entertainer Sammy Davis Jr. It was produced by Davis and Hillard Elkins and hosted by Davis. The Majestic Theatre was the host of Davis's musical Golden Boy at the time of the benefit; use of the theatre was donated by The Shubert Organization. To help promote black capitalism, Davis deposited $77,000 of the proceeds from the benefit into the Freedom National Bank in Harlem, two months after the show. Davis spoke of his experience on the Selma to Montgomery march at a breakfast meeting of the men's club at the Temple Emanu-El of New York on the morning of the concert. Davis drew a comparison between the treatment of black people in the Southern states to being "probably like the Jews in Germany" during the Third Reich and said that he was proud to have faced the "Southern extremists" that opposed the march. A rally held ahead of the concert in Manhattan's Theater District was attended by 5,000 people with stars of the show, members of the New York City Council, and members of the New York Police Department linking arms and singing "We Shall Overcome" which gained much media attention.

The concert was over 4 hours in duration. It was announced after the concert that a recording was to be produced of the event and jointly distributed by RCA Victor, Capitol, and Columbia Records.

Artworks by LeRoy Neiman and Andy Warhol were donated to be raffled at the intermission of the benefit, owing to time constraints the raffle did not take place. Salvador Dalí offered a painting to be raffled, but withdrew the artwork after he could not be guaranteed a minimum price of $25,000.

Some criticism following the concert concerned the relative representation of artists. Jet magazine wrote that at the concert "Conspicuous by their few numbers were Negroes in the audience and on stage". An article in the jazz magazine Coda lamented that there were no contemporary jazz musicians represented at the benefit.

== Performers ==
The following featured performers were listed in an advertisement in Billboard magazine for Broadway Answers Selma:

- Alan Alda
- Alan Arkin
- Jack Albertson
- Herschel Bernardi
- Victor Borge
- Tom Bosley
- Carol Burnett
- David Burns
- Art Carney
- Carol Bruce
- Carol Channing
- Sydney Chaplin
- Maurice Chevalier
- Betty Comden
- Barbara Cook
- Dan Dailey
- Irene Dailey
- Billy Daniels
- Ossie Davis
- Sammy Davis Jr.
- Ruby Dee
- Nancy Dussault
- Martin Gabel
- John Gielgud
- Eydie Gorme
- Adolph Green
- Buddy Hackett
- Leonid Hambro
- Tiger Haynes
- Anne Jackson
- Richard Kiley
- Steve Lawrence
- Bethel Leslie
- Bernice Massi
- Walter Matthau
- Karen Morrow
- Dennis O'Keefe
- Don Porter
- Robert Preston
- Robert Reed
- Marjorie Rhodes
- Chita Rivera
- Diana Sands
- Martha Scott
- Dick Shawn
- Martin Sheen
- Barbra Streisand
- Inga Swenson
- Eli Wallach
- Paula Wayne
- Fritz Weaver
- Donald Wolfit
- Irene Worth
