= The People in the Picture =

- Music: Mike Stoller; Artie Butler
- Lyrics: Iris Rainer Dart
- Book: Iris Rainer Dart
- Productions: 2011 Broadway

The People in the Picture is a musical with book and lyrics by Iris Rainer Dart and music by Mike Stoller and Artie Butler. The musical is about a grandmother recalling her life in the Yiddish theater and the Holocaust.

== Production ==
The People in the Picture premiered on Broadway at Studio 54 in a Roundabout Theatre Company production on April 28, 2011 after previews starting on April 1, 2011. This limited engagement closed as scheduled on June 19, 2011. The musical was directed by Leonard Foglia, with staging by Andy Blankenbuehler, musical direction by Paul Gemignani, sets by Riccardo Hernandez, costumes by Ann Hould-Ward, orchestrations by Michael Starobin and Doug Besterman, lighting by James F. Ingalls and projection by Elaine J. McCarthy. The cast featured Donna Murphy (Bubbie/Raisel), Alexander Gemignani (Moishe Rosenwald), Christopher Innvar (Chaim Bradovsky), Nicole Parker (Red), Rachel Resheff (Jenny), Hal Robinson (Doovie Feldman/Rabbi Velvel), Lewis J. Stadlen (Avram Krinsky), Joyce Van Patten (Chayesel Fisher) and Chip Zien (Yossie Pinsker).

== Critical reception ==
Ben Brantley, reviewing for The New York Times, wrote that the musical "has all the elements of an emotional bulldozer on autopilot: a plucky Jewish theater group working defiantly in the shadow of Nazism; mothers and daughters longing to love but locked in conflict; a family secret—buried in the rubble of postwar Poland—that must be revealed if any of our main characters are to find (no, stop me, please don’t let me say that word) closure." The New York Post reviewer wrote, "...it's not just the music that's subpar: The book is full of holes, and pulls at the heartstrings without earning its pathos."

The reviewer for Bloomberg wrote:

"In Donna Murphy, the creators have a shimmering star who can play a tender, doting grandma and yet evoke Lombard, that irresistible mix of winks and minx … Leonard Foglia’s hyperactive production is lovely, with set designer Riccardo Hernandez taking the title at face value and offering up lots of gilded frames to frame the action. James F. Ingalls’s lighting evokes an Old World glow in Warsaw, steelier light in Manhattan, and Ann Hould-Ward’s costumes also place us in those cities with subtle specificity. And the cast couldn’t be bettered. The standouts include Alexander Gemignani, Chip Zien and Lewis J. Stadlen as troupers, Parker as the mother and a young charmer, Rachel Resheff, as Jenny."

TheaterMania's reviewers said that the show "asks us to take a hard look at the suffering and the loss that resulted from this tragedy—and it moves us deeply in the process … The triumph of The People in the Picture is that the show insists upon—and earns—heroic stature for even small gestures of humanity."

Mark Kennedy of the Associated Press wrote, Iris Rainer Dart, "the playwright, gets full credit for conceiving of a cute way to have one generation talk to its descendants and has movingly captured an unconventional history lesson into a musical." Talkin' Broadway's reviewer called it "an unbelievably powerful look at the history we create and destroy, and the lives that are shattered or strengthened in our wakes … an achingly affecting antidote to the plethora of recent musicals, from this season and others, that throw everything at you except honesty."

== Musical numbers ==
Act 1

- "Bread and Theatre" ≠ – Bubbie/Raisel, The Warsaw Gang and Company
- "Matryoshka" ≠ – Jenny and Bubbie
- "Matryoshka (Reprise)" ≠ – Red
- "Shtetl Circuit" – Pinsker and Krinsky
- "Before We Lose the Light/The Dybbuk" ≠ – Bubbie/Raisel, The Warsaw Gang and Company
- "Remember Who You Are" ≈ – Yossie and Avram
- "Hollywood Girls" ≠ – Chaim Bradovsky, Bubbie/Raisel and Company
- "Remember Who You Are (Reprise)" – Avram, Yossie, Bubbie/Raisel, Moishe, Chaim and Chayesel
- "And God Laughs" ≠ – Moishe, Bubbie/Raisel and Rabbi Velvel
- "Oyfen Pripitchik" § – Bubbie/Raisel and Dobrisch
- "Red's Dilemma" ≠ – Red
- "For This" ≠ – Red, Jenny and Bubbie
- "Oyfen Pripitchik (Reprise)" – Jenny, Avram and Company

Act 2

- "We Were Here" ≈ – Bubbie/Raisel, Moishe, Chayesel, Avram and Company
- "Now and Then" ≠ – Red
- "Ich, Uch, Feh" ≈ – Bubbie/Raisel and Company
- "Selective Memory" ≠ – Bubbie/Raisel
- "Saying Goodbye" ≈ – Bubbie/Raisel, Dobrisch, Red and Young Red
- "Child of My Child" ≠ – Bubbie
- "Remember Who You Are (Reprise)" ≈ – Bubbie
- "Bread and Theatre (Reprise)" ≠ – Bubbie/Raisel and The Warsaw Gang
- "We Were Here (Reprise)" ≈ – Bubbie/Raisel and The Warsaw Gang

Note: Lyrics by Iris Rainer Dart except as noted; ≠ music by Mike Stoller; ≈ music by Artie Butler; § music and lyrics by Mark Warshavsky.

== Awards and nominations ==
=== Original Broadway production ===
Year	Award	Category	Nominee	Result	Ref
2011	Tony Award	Best Performance by a Leading Actress in a Musical	Donna Murphy	Nominated	
2011	Drama Desk Award	Outstanding Book of a Musical	Iris Rainer Dart	Nominated	
2011	Drama Desk Award	Outstanding Actress in a Musical	Donna Murphy	Nominated	
2011	Drama Desk Award	Outstanding Music	Mike Stoller and Artie Butler	Nominated	
2011	Outer Critics Circle Award	Outstanding Actress in a Musical	Donna Murphy	Nominated	
