= Beaches (novel) =

1985 novel by Iris Rainer Dart

- First edition
- Author: Iris Rainer Dart
- Language: English
- Genre: Fiction
- Publisher: Bantam Books
- Publication date: June 1, 1985
- Publication place: United States
- Media type: Hardcover
- Pages: 276
- ISBN: 0-553-05081-8
- OCLC: 13124258
- Followed by: I'll Be There (1991)

Beaches is a 1985 novel written by Iris Rainer Dart about two friends, struggling actress Cee Cee Bloom, and the conventional Bertie White. The story follows them through their life, as young girls until their mid-to-late 30s.

Dart published a sequel titled I'll Be There (published in paperback as Beaches 2: I'll Be There) in 1991. The sequel follows Cee Cee as she cares for the daughter of her late friend Roberta.

== Film adaptations ==
- Beaches, a 1988 film starring Bette Midler and Barbara Hershey. The character Bertie White was renamed to Hilary Whitney.
- Lifetime did a contemporary remake starring Idina Menzel as CC Bloom and Nia Long as Hillary Whitney that premiered January 21, 2017.
