= Artists and Models (revue) =

Musical revue that featured nude performers on Broadway (1923–1930)

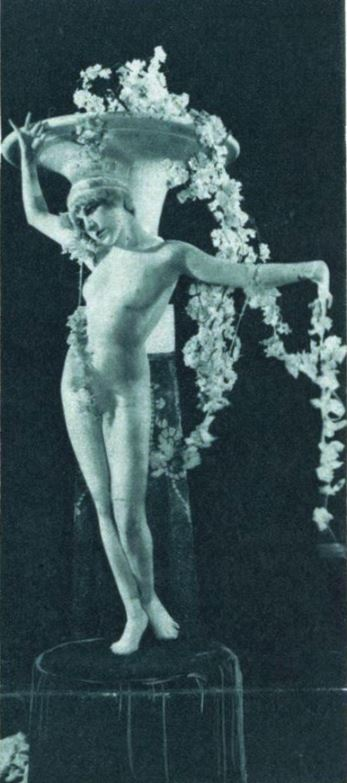
Mary Kissell in a 1925 performance

Artists and Models was a series of five theatrical revues staged by brothers Lee and J. J. Shubert at the Shubert Theatre and other theaters operated by The Shubert Organization in New York City between 1923 and 1930.

First staged on August 20, 1923, the shows developed from performances put on at Century Roof Theatre in Greenwich Village by the Illustrators Society of New York, and were the first revues to feature topless and naked females in movement on the Broadway stage. Prior to this, any female nudity in Broadway revues such as the Ziegfeld Follies featured women in static displays similar to tableaux vivants, which were considered acceptable and not censored. Although the performers in Artists and Models were purportedly playing the roles of artists' models, the shows "emphasized girls in various stages of undress", and "aimed at a fairly low-brow audience". The shows employed respected composers such as Jean Schwartz, J. Fred Coots, Sigmund Romberg, Al Goodman, Harry Akst, Owen Murphy, and Harry Warren, and proved popular with audiences despite mixed reviews. The 1923 production was hosted by comedian Frank Fay, who in the 1920s was the highest paid vaudeville performer. Dancer Lucita Covera appeared in the 1926 revue.

The show's title was later adopted for films in 1937 and 1955.
