= Beaches (1988 film) =

1988 American comedy-drama film

- Theatrical release poster
- Directed by: Garry Marshall
- Written by: Mary Agnes Donoghue
- Based on: Beaches by Iris Rainer Dart
- Produced by: Bonnie Bruckheimer-Martell; Bette Midler; Margaret South
- Starring: Bette Midler; Barbara Hershey
- Cinematography: Dante Spinotti
- Edited by: Richard Halsey
- Music by: Georges Delerue
- Production companies: Touchstone Pictures; Silver Screen Partners IV; All Girl Productions
- Distributed by: Buena Vista Pictures Distribution
- Release date: December 21, 1988
- Running time: 123 minutes
- Country: United States
- Language: English
- Budget: $20 million
- Box office: $57 million

Beaches is a 1988 American comedy drama film based on the 1985 novel of the same name by Iris Rainer Dart. It was directed by Garry Marshall from a screenplay by Mary Agnes Donoghue, and stars Bette Midler, Barbara Hershey, Mayim Bialik, John Heard, James Read, Spalding Gray, and Lainie Kazan.

Depending on the region, the film also goes by titles such as Forever Friends, Remember Me (alternately), Throughout Life (France), Girlfriends (Germany), The Friends (Greece & Denmark), Eternally Friends (Spain), On the Beach (Russia), Deeper Love Than Sisters (Taiwan), and Song on the Beach (Turkey).

The film is now regarded as a cult classic.

== Plot ==
Cecilia Carol "C.C." Bloom, a New York actress and singer, receives a note during a concert rehearsal in Los Angeles and hurriedly leaves to be with her friend Hillary Whitney, a San Francisco heiress and lawyer. Due to fog preventing flights into San Francisco, C.C. instead rents a car and drives overnight and reflects on their lifelong friendship along the journey.

In flashback, they meet in 1958 under the boardwalk in Atlantic City, New Jersey. Hillary is lost and C.C. is hiding from her stage mother Leona. They become close penpals; Hillary becomes a human rights lawyer, but C.C.'s singing career falters. Hillary shows up at the dive bar where C.C. is performing, their first meeting since Atlantic City. She moves in with C.C. and starts work with the ACLU. C.C. finally lands work from John Pierce, a theatrical director.

The two women's friendship is put to the test by various romantic relationships, but always eventually survives these upheavals. Finally, C.C. makes it as a Broadway star. Hillary appears with her new man, Michael Essex, but there is new friction: C.C. castigates Hillary for forsaking the law; Hillary tells C.C. she's obsessed with her career. The two women's friendship seems to have ended.

They both end up getting divorces, but discover that they have been secretly jealous of each other for years: Hillary of C.C.'s talent; C.C. of Hillary's intelligence.

Hillary tells C.C. that she is pregnant, and has already decided to raise the child as a single parent. This wins her admiration from the feisty and independent C.C., who promises to stay and help her out. C.C. starts talking of settling down, and having a family of her own, having become engaged to Hillary's obstetrician, Richard Milstein. However, when C.C.'s agent calls with the perfect comeback gig for her, C.C. abandons her fiancé, and races back to New York City. Hillary gives birth to a daughter, whom she names Victoria Cecilia. When Victoria is a young girl, Hillary develops viral cardiomyopathy, requiring a heart transplant. Having a rare tissue type, she learns she will most likely die before a donor is found.

C.C. has become a big star, having won a Tony award, and completed her latest hit album. When she learns of Hillary's illness, she accompanies Hillary and Victoria to the beach house for the summer. Hillary becomes depressed due to her debilitated state, and takes her frustration out on C.C. whom she sees having fun with and connecting with Victoria. Hillary eventually begins to accept her prognosis bravely, appreciating her time with Victoria and C.C. Hillary and Victoria return to San Francisco, while C.C. heads to Los Angeles for a concert. Hillary collapses and is found by her daughter, leading to the note C.C. receives that prompts her to leave her rehearsal. C.C. takes Hillary and Victoria to the beach house, where Hillary dies.

After the funeral, C.C. takes custody of Victoria, and the two console each other in their grief. C.C. goes forward with her concert, which she concludes by singing "The Glory of Love", the first song Hillary heard her sing 30 years ago; as the song ends, C.C. tearfully waves toward the sky in tribute to Hillary. After the show, she leaves hand-in-hand with Victoria and begins telling stories of when she first met her mother.

== Cast ==
- Bette Midler as Cecilia Carol "C.C." Bloom
  - Mayim Bialik as 11-year-old Cecilia Carol "C.C." Bloom
- Barbara Hershey as Hillary Whitney
  - Marcie Leeds as 11-year-old Hillary Whitney
- John Heard as John Pierce
- Spalding Gray as Dr. Richard Milstein
- James Read as Michael Essex
- Lainie Kazan as Leona Bloom
- Grace Johnston as Victoria Essex
- Lynda Goodfriend as Mrs. Myandowski
- Tracy Reiner as Department Store Clerk
- Jenifer Lewis as Diva
- Joe Grifasi as Otto Titsling
- Phil Leeds as Sammy Pinkers
- Frank Campanella as Doorman
- Kathleen Marshall as Delivery Room Nurse #1
- Barbara Marshall as I.C. U. Nurse #2
- Scott Marshall as Car Rental Agent
- Héctor Elizondo as Judge
- Garry Marshall as Audition Director
- Marc Shaiman as Pianist

== Production ==
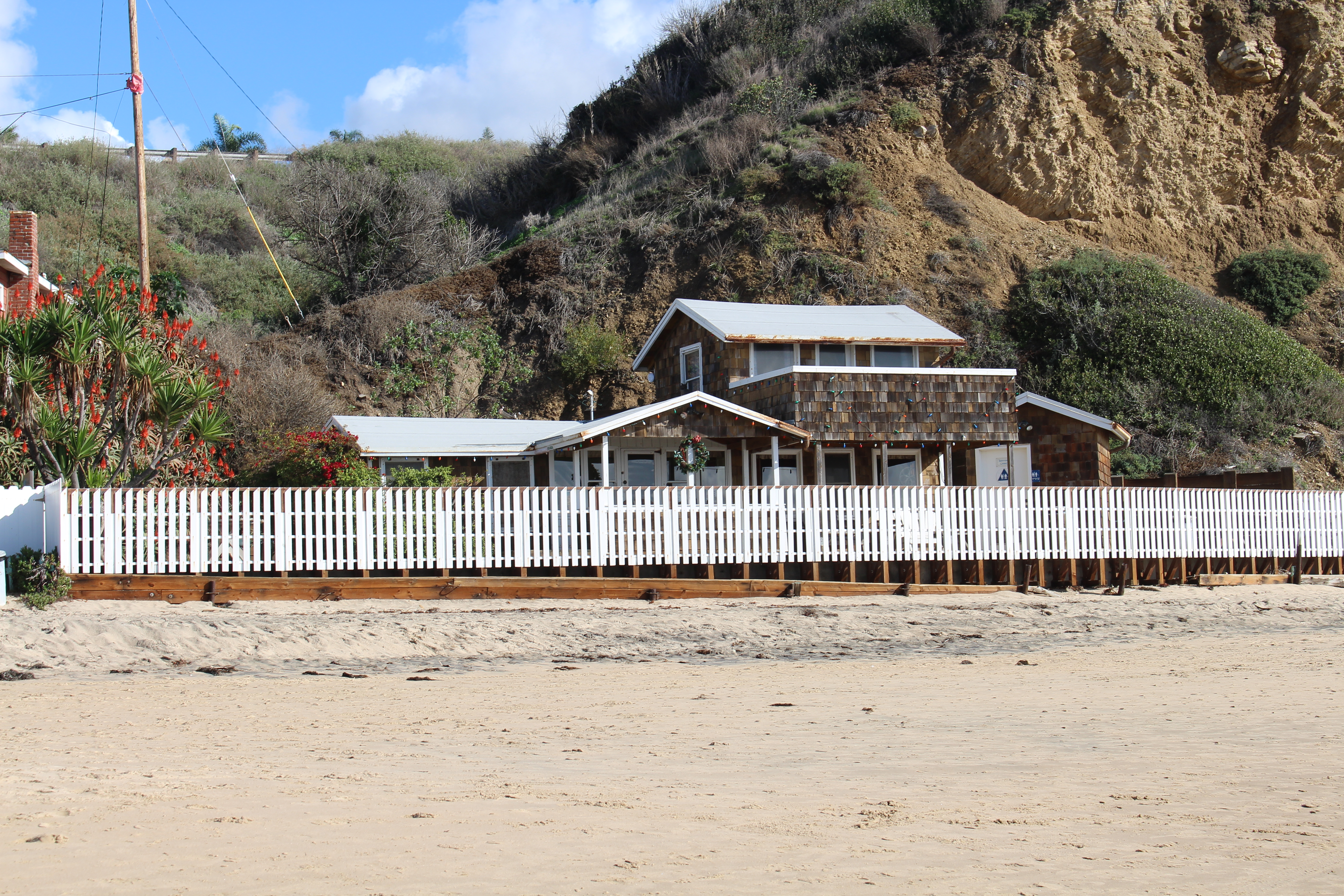
Cottage #13 at Crystal Cove (as of 2019)

The beach house scenes were filmed at cottage #13 in what is now the Crystal Cove Historic District in Crystal Cove State Park in California.

== Music ==
The film's theme song, "Wind Beneath My Wings", hit number one on the Billboard Hot 100 charts and won Grammy Awards for Record of the Year and Song of the Year in 1990.

== Release ==
=== Box office ===
The film opened December 21, 1988 and grossed $215,865 in its first 6 days from 7 screens. It opened nationwide January 13, 1989 and grossed $5,160,258 during its first wide weekend and went on to gross a total of $57,041,866 in the United States and Canada.

=== Home media ===
The film was released on VHS, Betamax and laserdisc by Touchstone Home Video on August 23, 1989, with a DVD release on August 13, 2002, followed by a special-edition DVD on April 26, 2005. The film was later released in High Definition Blu-ray format on November 6, 2012.

== Reception ==
=== Critical reception ===
On review aggregator website Rotten Tomatoes, the film holds an approval rating of 41% based on 46 critic reviews. The consensus summarizes: "Not all great soundtracks make good movies, and Beaches lacks the wind beneath its wings." Critics almost unanimously found the film's emotional moments to be unearned, calculated, and familiar to the point of being predictable. Roger Ebert assessed that "'Beaches' lacks the spontaneity of life. This is a movie completely constructed out of other movies - out of cliches and archetypes that were old before most of the cast members were born." He found the problem was compounded by the film foreshadowing Hillary's death right from the beginning, and gave it two and a half stars. Gene Siskel called it "a much too mechanical tearjerker" and criticized the slow pace, but acknowledged that he heard some sniffling among the audience and gave it two and a half stars. Jay Boyar noted in the Orlando Sentinel, "In advance publicity for Beaches, it has been routinely referred to as a 'tear-jerker.' Though the term is sometimes used admiringly these days, doesn't it actually mean that a movie has emotional scenes in which the emotion is somehow trumped-up or unearned? This is the sort of picture in which people slap each other as they take their marriage vows, suddenly develop life-threatening diseases, and, again, have violent confrontations whenever there's a break in the action. Anything for a laugh, anything for a tear, and nothing much authentic." Similarly to Ebert, he called it "a 1940s retread", noting its use of antiquated themes like the idea that a woman must choose between being a mother and having a career.

Dave Kehr likewise stated in the Chicago Tribune that "Beaches struggles to update a 1940s formula", describing it as particularly derivative of the 1943 film Old Acquaintance. He also felt the friendship between C.C. and Hillary to be implausible and lacking in genuine warmth, and commented that "The cardinal rule of melodrama ... is that emotion must follow from situation. When that relationship is inverted, the result is sheer manipulation and blatantly false." He gave it two stars. Sheila Benson of the Los Angeles Times called it "the most shamelessly manipulative movie since they shot the dog in The Biscuit Eater." While opining that emotional manipulation isn't necessarily bad, she felt the film had failed to capture what made the novel it is adapted from such an effective tearjerker, by neglecting the essence of C.C. and Hillary's friendship and instead focusing on petty arguments between the two. However, she praised the performances of Midler and Hershey, and admitted that the film succeeded in making her cry.

Several critics remarked that the scenes of C.C. and Hillary's childhood were more emotionally convincing and enjoyable than the rest of the film, with particular praise for Mayim Bialik's performance. Midler's numerous singing performances were also frequently cited as a strong point in a mostly weak film.

The film remained mostly poorly regarded over later decades but only by critics, as the film has an enormous fan base. In reviews for the 2017 remake, The New York Times and CNN Entertainment recalled the 1988 film as, respectively, "a pastiche of 1950s tear-jerkers that was set, strangely and uncomfortably, in the 1970s and ’80s. ... a shamelessly retrograde and literal-minded soap opera with a veneer of fake feminism" and "a film that delivered a hit song and strong box-office results but is remembered mostly for its high schmaltz factor."

=== Accolades ===
Included on the soundtrack was Midler's performance of "Wind Beneath My Wings". The song won Grammys for Record of the Year and Song of the Year in 1990. The film was nominated for the Academy Award for Best Art Direction (Albert Brenner and Garrett Lewis).

The song is recognized by American Film Institute in this list:

- 2004: AFI's 100 Years...100 Songs:
  - "Wind Beneath My Wings" – #44

== Adaptations ==
=== Television remake ===
Lifetime announced a remake of the film, which aired on January 22, 2017. The updated version was directed by Allison Anders with the script by Bart Barker and Nikole Beckwith, and Idina Menzel plays the role of C.C. Nia Long plays the role of Hillary alongside Menzel. The film includes the songs "Wind Beneath My Wings" and "The Glory of Love".

=== Stage musical adaptation ===
A musical stage adaptation has been written, based on the book by Iris Rainer Dart, with lyrics and book by Dart and Thom Thomas (book) and music by David Austin. The musical premiered at the Signature Theatre, Arlington, Virginia in February 2014. The musical was directed by Eric D. Schaeffer, with Alysha Umphress as Cee Cee Bloom and Mara Davi as Bertie White.

The musical next opened at the Drury Lane Theatre, Oak Brook, Illinois, in June 2015 (previews). Again directed by Schaeffer, Shoshana Bean plays Cee Cee and Whitney Bashor plays Bertie. The choreographer is Lorin Latarro, with scenic design by Derek McLane, lighting design by Howell Binkley, costume design by Alejo Vietti and sound design by Kai Harada. A Broadway production, based on the 2024 production at Theatre Calgary in Alberta, is scheduled to begin performances on March 27, 2026 at the Majestic Theatre with an opening night on April 22; the production closed on May 24, 2026

== Cancelled sequel ==
A sequel, based on the 1991 novel Beaches II: I'll Be There was planned with Barbara Eden but never filmed.
