= Iris R. Dart =

American writer

- Born: Iris Rainer; March 3, 1944 (age 82); Pittsburgh, Pennsylvania, U.S.
- Education: Carnegie Mellon University
- Spouse(s): Steve Wolf (?-1977; divorced); Stephen Dart
- Children: 2
- Writing career
- Notable work: Beaches

Iris Rainer Dart (née Rainer; born March 3, 1944) is an American author and playwright for television and the stage. Her most notable novel is Beaches, which was made into a 1988 film of the same name. She has also written several stage musicals as well as for television shows, such as The Sonny and Cher Show. She voiced Donna, Peter Cottontail's love interest, in the 1971 stop-motion Easter special, Here Comes Peter Cottontail.

== Early life ==
Iris Rainer was born in Pittsburgh, Pennsylvania, and was an actress as a youth with the Curtaineers, an interracial theater group at the Settlement house, at the Pittsburgh Playhouse, and The White Barn Theatre. She also went to classes at the Pittsburgh Playhouse as a child.

She graduated from Taylor Allderdice High School in 1962 and was inducted into their alumni hall of fame in 2009. She is a graduate of Carnegie Mellon University with a degree in theater.

== Career ==
In a mid-2007 interview, when asked the question: "Has the Jewish cultural dynamic in your upbringing influenced what and how you write?", Dart replied "Unquestionably. I grew up in a household where both my parents were immigrants – my mother from Russia, father from Lithuania – and they spoke more Yiddish in my house than English, so it was just a [sic] completely a part of who I was."

Dart has written nine novels, including Beaches. She wrote for The Sonny and Cher Show variety show in the 1970s. She got the idea to write about a woman "loosely based on 'the no holds barred outrageous person' that she found in Cher. The character became "Cee Cee Bloom" in her ...novel Beaches later made into the iconic film of the same name starring Bette Midler."

She wrote the book and lyrics for the 2009 stage musical, Laughing Matters, for the Pasadena Playhouse, California. Her next work was the Roundabout Theatre Broadway production of her new musical, The People in the Picture, which opened on April 28, 2011, and closed on June 19, 2011, and starred Donna Murphy.

== Personal life ==
She was married to rock concert promoter Steve Wolf until they divorced in 1977 (less than half a year before he was murdered when robbers broke into his house). She is currently married to Stephen Dart, a California businessman. She has two adult children, a son (by Wolf) and a daughter (by Dart), and two grandchildren.

== Bibliography ==
Source: Fiction Database

- The Boys in the Mailroom (1980)
- Beaches (1985)
- Til the Real Thing Comes Along (1987)
- I'll Be There (republished as Beaches 2: I'll Be There) (1991)
- The Stork Club (1992)
- Show Business Kills (1995)
- When I Fall in Love (1999)
- Some Kind of Miracle (2003)
