= Aaron Richmond =

American performing arts manager, pianist, impresario, and educator

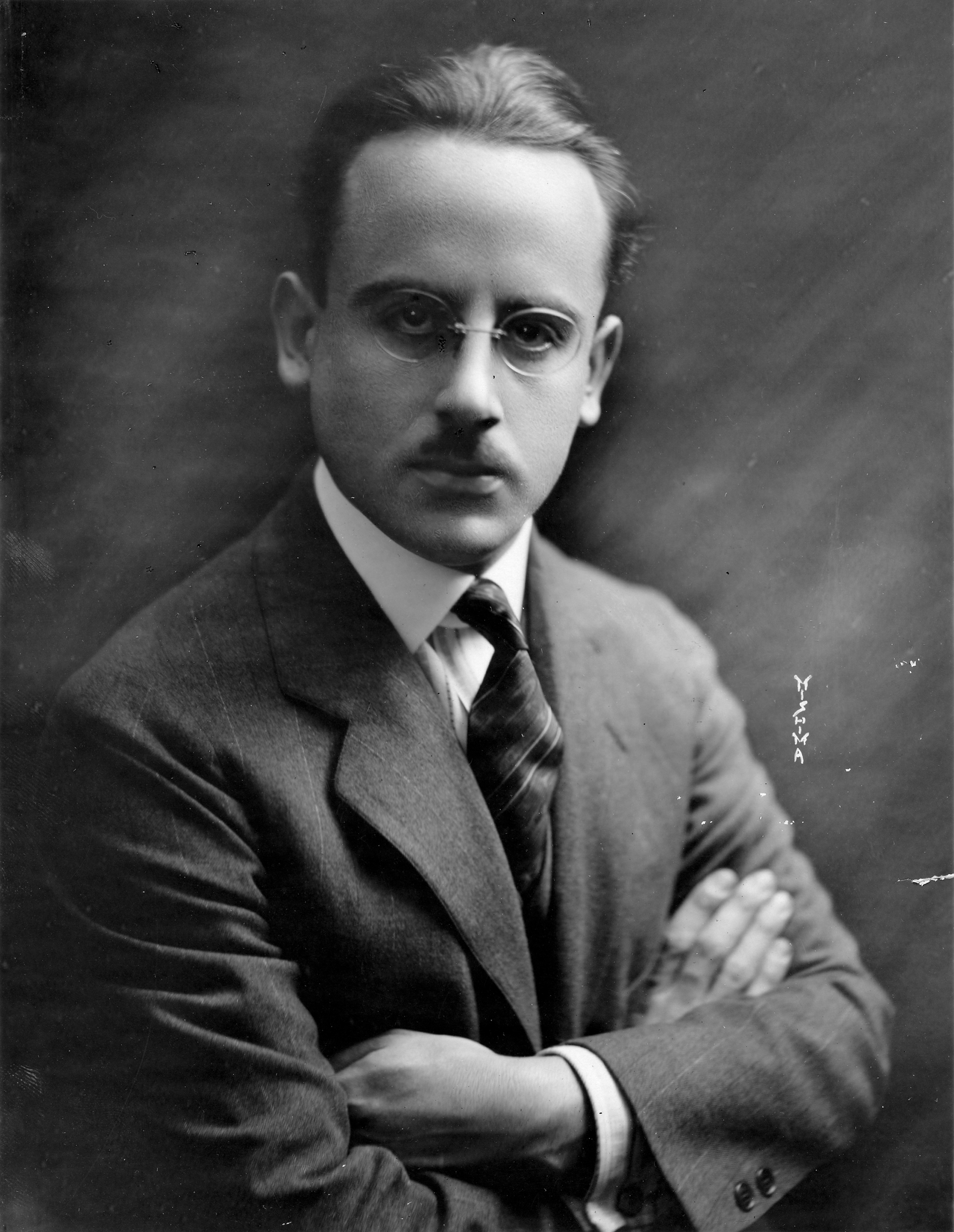
- Aaron Richmond: performing arts manager, pianist, impresario, and educator
- Born: Aaron Richmond; October 28, 1895; Salem, Massachusetts, United States
- Died: April 21, 1965 (aged 69); Boston, Massachusetts, United States
- Known for: impresario, promoter, arts administrator, concert pianist

Aaron Richmond (October 28, 1895, in Salem, Massachusetts – April 21, 1965, in Boston, Massachusetts) was an American performing arts manager, pianist, impresario, and educator, based in Boston, Massachusetts, who managed the careers of numerous classical musicians and founded, in the late 1930s, Celebrity Series of Boston, a performing arts presenting organization that still operates today.

== Early years ==
Aaron Richmond was born in 1895 in Salem, Massachusetts, where he had his formal education. After graduating from high school, he intensified his musical training with the goal of becoming a concert pianist. The following was noted in a brief Boston Globe review of a 1919 performance in which Richmond accompanied baritone Giovanni Petrucci at Boston's Steinert Hall, "Mr. Petrucci was assisted by Aaron Richmond, who played his accompaniments and a group of piano pieces."

In 1917, Richmond toured extensively as a pianist with the Tchaikovsky Quartet. During the same period, Richmond's friend, conductor Arthur Fiedler, was forced to cancel a series of bookings on the Chautauqua circuit. Mr. Richmond filled in as pianist on the tour and later organized Richmond’s Little Symphony, a sextet that toured the circuit for several summers playing arrangements of orchestral works. He served as pianist and lecturer on the program and often the newspaper critic of the concerts. Richmond’s Little Symphony made at least one Chautuaqua circuit tour with William Jennings Bryan.

== Artist manager ==
An onstage lapse of memory during Richmond's Boston debut caused him to reevaluate his professional goals and led him to a career in music management. His first office contained a studio where he continued to teach piano while he formed the core of his artists’ list from members of the Boston Symphony Orchestra and some prominent Boston vocalists.

Pianist Ignace Jan Paderewski was quoted as saying of Richmond, "[He was] perhaps the only manager I have ever known to whom the word 'suite' has meant a musical composition and not a set of furniture for a room." In the Daily Boston Globe in 1948, Richmond said of himself, "Music to me is not just a business, an occupation, but a passion ... presenting great artists to the public, and expanding that public, is my mission. I never feel right unless I am convinced that my artists are of top rank."

=== First roster ===
Aaron Richmond Concert Management's roster for the 1920–21 season included pianist Felix Fox, cellist Jean Bedetti, soprano Laura Littlefield, flutist Georges Laurent, the American String Quartette, the Smalley Trio, the operatic duo of Mr. and Mrs. George Mager and the Boston Symphony Ensemble, under the direction of Augusto Vannini.

In the ensuing decades, Richmond also represented soprano Claudine Leeve, violinist Carmela Ippolito, pianists Harrison Potter and Leo Podolsky, the Durrell String Quartet, tenor Joseph Lautner, the Fiedler Trio (Arthur Fiedler, violin; Alfred Hoy, harp, and Jacobus Lengendoen, cello), the Boston Sinfonietta, conducted by Arthur Fiedler, and piano and vocal folk-song duo Constance and Henry Gideon.

In the early 1920s, Richmond was appointed the New England Manager of the Wolfsohn Musical Bureau, Inc. and, later, became the sole New England representative for the National Concert and Artists Corporation, and later for the NBC Artists Service. In this role, Richmond was the New England artist representative for Sergei Rachmaninoff, Mischa Levitski, Kirsten Flagstad, Fritz Kreisler, Monte Carlo Ballet Russe and the Vienna Choir Boys, among many others.

== Concert presenter ==
=== First concert series ===
Richmond presented his first concert series in Boston during the 1924–25 season. The new venture, called the Wolfsohn Series, included sopranos Katherine Palmer, Kathleen McAlister, Suzanne Dabney, Mildred Cobb, and Laura Littlefield; contraltos Abbie Conley Rice, Betty Gray and Rose Zulalian; mezzo-soprano Elena Gerhardt; baritones, Parish Williams, William Richardson, Wellington Smith, and Ernest Lamoureaux; pianists Winifred Byrd, Moriz Rosenthal, Cyrus Ullian, Hyman Rovinsky, Alexander Brailowsky, George Smith, Harold Morris, Harrison Potter, Grace Cronin, Guiomar Novaes, Alfredo Oswald, and Alberto Sciarretti; the Kibalchich Russian Symphonic Choir and The Roman Choir; the Fox-Burgin-Bedetti Trio; cellist Felix Salmond and violinists Joseph Coleman, Harry Farbman, and Paul Cherkassky.

Over the next several years, Richmond also presented such noted artists as pianist and composer Sergei Rachmaninoff, singer and composer J. Rosamond Johnson, pianist Harold Samuel, contralto Margarete Matzenauer, the Fisk Jubilee Singers, Harrison Keller, Denoe Leedy, violinist Albert Spalding, the People's Symphony Orchestra and the Cleveland Orchestra.

=== The Celebrity Series launched ===
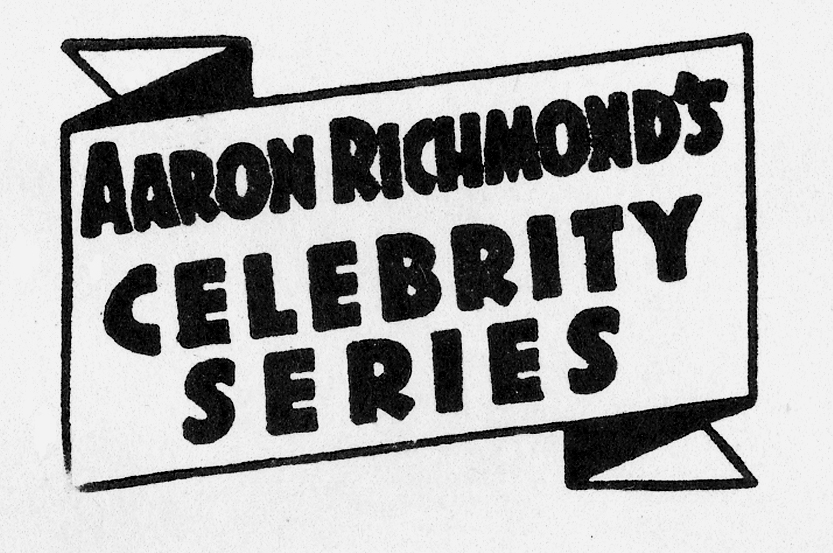
Original 1938 logo of Aaron Richmond's Celebrity Series

Aaron Richmond's Celebrity Series was launched (12 years after his first concert series) for the 1938-39 concert season. In 1953, still under Aaron Richmond's direction, the Celebrity Series affiliated with Boston University and took the name, the Boston University Celebrity Series.

In 1984, the Celebrity Series changed affiliations and moved its operations under the auspices of the Wang Center for the Performing Arts. Then, in 1989, the Celebrity Series incorporated as Bank of Boston Celebrity Series, an independent, non-profit institution with its own board of directors and an annual budget of over $3 million. Today the Celebrity Series annual operating budget is approximately $7 million. After 18 years of operating with the title sponsorship support of Bank of Boston, BankBoston, FleetBoston Financial, and Bank of America, the Celebrity Series began operating under its incorporated name, Celebrity Series of Boston, in June 2007.

Aaron Richmond presented many performers during his 27-year tenure as director of the Celebrity Series of Boston:

==== Music ====
- Adolf Busch
- Alexander Brailowsky
- Andrés Segovia
- Artur Rubinstein
- Artur Schnabel
- Arturo Toscanini
- Béla Bartók
- Benny Goodman
- Berlin Philharmonic
- Birgit Nilsson
- Boris Goldovsky
- Burl Ives
- Chicago Symphony Orchestra
- Cleveland Orchestra
- Claudio Arrau
- Efrem Zimbalist
- Elisabeth Schwarzkopf
- Eugene Ormandy
- Ezio Pinza
- Francis Poulenc
- Fritz Kreisler
- George Szell
- Glenn Gould
- Gregor Piatigorsky
- Guarneri Quartet
- Herbert von Karajan
- Ignace Jan Paderewski
- Igor Stravinsky
- Isaac Stern
- Israel Philharmonic
- Jascha Heifetz
- Joseph Szigeti
- Juilliard String Quartet
- Kirsten Flagstad
- Leon Fleisher
- Lily Pons
- Maria Callas
- Marian Anderson
- NBC Symphony Orchestra
- New York Philharmonic
- Philadelphia Orchestra
- Roland Hayes
- Rudolf Serkin
- Jan Smeterlin
- Sergei Rachmaninoff
- Trapp Family Singers
- Van Cliburn
- Victor Borge
- Vienna Philharmonic
- Vladimir Horowitz
- Yehudi Menuhin

==== Dance ====
- Agnes de Mille Dance Theatre
- Angna Enters
- Ballet Russe de Monte Carlo
- Bolshoi Ballet
- Destine Haitian Dance Company
- Geoffrey Holder Dance Company
- Iva Kitchell
- Jooss European Ballet
- Jose Greco & his Spanish Dancers
- Katherine Dunham
- Kirov Ballet
- Martha Graham and Company
- Merce Cunningham Dance Company
- Original Ballet Russe, Col. De Basil, director general
- Pearl Primus Dance Company
- Sadlers Wells Ballet/Royal Ballet
- Trudi Schoop and Her Dancing Comedians
- Uday Shankar and his Hindu Ballet

==== Theatre/speakers ====
- Bristol Old Vic
- Cornelia Otis Skinner
- Emlyn Williams as Charles Dickens
- Hal Holbrook in "Mark Twain Tonight!"
- Ruth Draper
- Sir Thomas Beecham

Following Richmond's death on April 21, 1965, his associate Walter Pierce assumed direction of the Celebrity Series. In 1986, Mr. Pierce hired Martha H. Jones as the Celebrity Series' Director of Marketing. She later became general manager, and, in 1996, when Mr. Pierce retired his full-time post, Martha Jones was appointed executive director. Following Martha Jones' retirement from the Celebrity Series in 2011, Gary Dunning was appointed to the position.

== Association with Sol Hurok ==
Aaron Richmond's business association with noted impresario Sol Hurok dated from 1926. Richmond frequently served as the regional representative for Hurok's tours. On Richmond's death in 1965, Hurok said in The Boston Globe

Aaron Richmond contributed to Boston what Hurok contributes to New York. He had the ideal spirit: 'Boston should see this company, hear this musician.' That came first, money later. That made cultural life blossom. He wanted, so do I, that this country should know what is going on in the world. He put all his time, energy, vitality, knowledge to do it. I have lost a good friend.

== Other projects ==
Richmond served as artistic advisor to numerous colleges and committees throughout the New England area, including the Boston Morning Musical Association (Boston, Massachusetts), the Harvard Musical Association (Boston, Massachusetts), Weston Country Evening Concert Series, South End Music Centre (Boston, Massachusetts), Boston Community Music Centre (Boston, Massachusetts), the James Spooner Fund Concerts (Plymouth, Massachusetts), Gile Fund Concerts (Concord, New Hampshire), the Greater New Bedford Concert Series (New Bedford, Massachusetts), Temple Beth El Concert Series (Providence, Rhode Island), the South Shore Concert Association (Massachusetts), as well as Smith and Williams Colleges, the Massachusetts Institute of Technology and the Connecticut College for Women.

Aaron Richmond was a founding member of the Concerts Association of America, founded in 1937 "to meet the pressing problems now confronting the concert-giving field." In 1951, Richmond was elected vice president of the National Association of Concert Managers, which later became the International Society for the Performing Arts (ISPA).

Richmond took over direction of the Castle Hill Festival in Ipswich, Massachusetts, in 1964 where he organized the New England debut of violinist Itzhak Perlman and a concert by an eighteen-year-old Peter Serkin.

Richmond also taught piano throughout his career, and for years kept a room adjacent to his business office in which he taught piano.

== Honors ==
The French government made Aaron Richmond a Chevalier of The Ordre des Arts et des Lettres in 1961, and the West German government gave him the Order of Merit of the Federal Republic of Germany in 1962 for his role in the cultural exchange program.
