= Celebrity Series of Boston =

Non-profit organization in the US

The Celebrity Series of Boston is a non-profit performing arts presenter established in Boston, Massachusetts by Boston impresario Aaron Richmond in 1938 as Aaron Richmond's Celebrity Series. In 2026 it changed its name to Vivo Performing Arts.

Each season from early fall to late spring, the Celebrity Series presents more than 50 multi-cultural and international artists and performing ensembles to audiences in the Greater Boston area. By utilizing a number of different performance venues throughout the Greater Boston area, each year the Celebrity Series bring audiences together to experience emerging and established orchestras, chamber ensembles and soloists, and leading artists in contemporary dance, jazz, world and folk music, and spoken word.

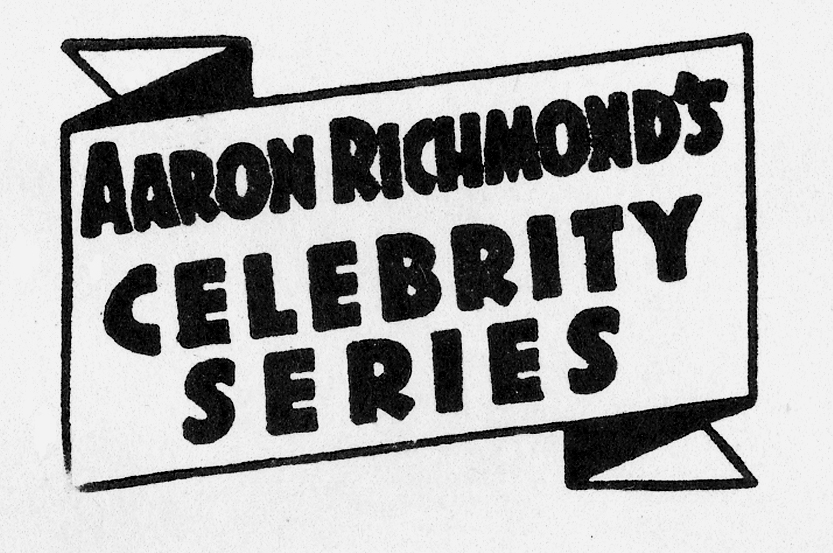
Original 1938 logo of Aaron Richmond's Celebrity Series

The Celebrity Series has operated under a number of organizational umbrellas. In 1938, Aaron Richmond founded Aaron Richmond's Celebrity Series. In 1953, it affiliated with Boston University and took the name, the Boston University Celebrity Series. In 1984, the Celebrity Series changed affiliations and moved its operations under the auspices of the Wang Center for the Performing Arts a not-for-profit institution. Then, in 1989, the Celebrity Series incorporated as an independent, non-profit institution with its own Board of Directors and an annual budget of over $3 million (now between $7 million and $9 million). After 18 years of operating with the title sponsorship support of Bank of Boston, BankBoston, FleetBoston Financial, and Bank of America, the Celebrity Series began operating under its incorporated name, Celebrity Series of Boston, in June 2007.

== Leadership ==
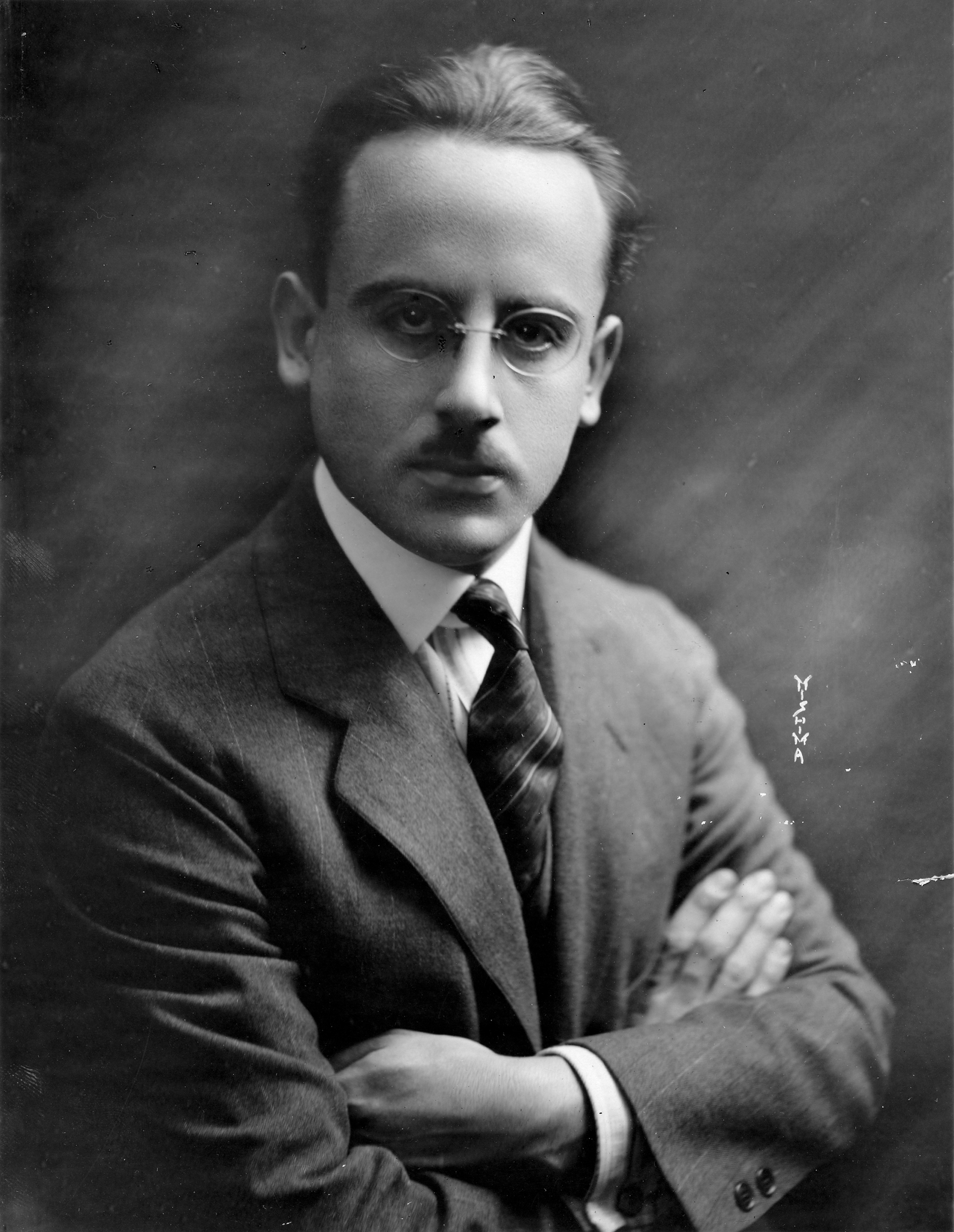
Aaron Richmond: performing arts manager, pianist, impresario, and educator

Leadership of the Celebrity Series has remained consistent over its lifetime. In 1958, Aaron Richmond hired Walter Pierce as a Programming Associate. Pierce later became Executive Director and guided the Series from an impresario-style presenter to a fully staffed, not-for-profit organization. In 1986, Mr. Pierce hired Martha H. Jones as the Series' Director of Marketing. Jones later became General Manager, and, in 1996, when Mr. Pierce retired his full-time post, Martha Jones was appointed Executive Director. Ms. Jones retired in 2011. She was succeeded by Gary Dunning. In 2026, Thor Steingraber was appointed president and chief executive.

In 1971, the Celebrity Series merged with the Boston Opera Association. During this time, Walter Pierce worked closely with Harriet O’Brien, managing director of the Boston Opera Association, sponsors of the annual one-week Boston engagement of the Metropolitan Opera. Following Ms. O’Brien’s death, Mr. Pierce managed the Metropolitan Opera week in Boston until the company ceased touring.

In 1998, a gala concert in honor of Walter Pierce was staged at Boston's Symphony Hall. It was announced during the festivities that seat P-1 in Symphony Hall had been endowed in Pierce's name and that the Celebrity Series had formed the Walter Pierce Annual Performance Fund. Among the performers were pianist Dubravka Tomsic, who played Liszt's Mephisto Waltz; flutist Jean-Pierre Rampal with pianist John Steel Ritter, who played Beethoven's Three National Airs with Variations, Opus 107; William Bolcom and Joan Morris, who performed Billy Desmond and Walter Dore's song, "When Are You Going to Lead Me to the Altar, Walter?"; the Juilliard String Quartet, a trio of pianist Emanuel Ax, violinist Isaac Stern, and cellist Yo-Yo Ma, and Nasha Thomas-Schmitt of the Alvin Ailey American Dance Theater, who danced Alvin Ailey's solo piece "Cry.". At the dinner following the performance, soprano Leontyne Price sang an impromptu version of "This Little Light of Mine" for Pierce.

== Programs ==
=== Arts for All! ===
Launched in the mid-1980s, Arts for All! encompasses four distinct initiatives: Neighborhood Arts, Artist Connections, Take Your Seat, and Public Performance Projects.

- Neighborhood Arts presents free concerts and school visits with professional Boston-affiliated artists in partnership with neighborhood venues in Back Bay, Cambridge, Dorchester, Jamaica Plain, Mattapan, Roxbury, and the South End.
- Artist Connections encompasses master classes, lecture-demonstrations, talkbacks, open rehearsals, and interactive workshops from Celebrity Series’ subscription season artists.
- Take Your Seat provides complimentary and $10 tickets to Celebrity Series subscription season performances to partner school and community groups that serve primarily low-income youth and families. Approximately 2,000 of these tickets are offered every season, often complementing the Artist Connections experiences.
- Free outdoor Public Performance Projects

Around 60,000 individuals attend Celebrity Series concerts each year. While audiences come from as far north as Maine and as far south as New Jersey, the majority come from the greater Boston metropolitan area. The Celebrity Series – through the Arts for All! program – attempts to ensure that its audience is ethnically diverse and includes people from all age groups and socio-economic backgrounds.

=== The Debut Series ===
Launched in 2012, The Debut Series presents classical musicians in the early stages of their careers in the intimate setting of Pickman Hall at Longy School of Music of Bard College.

A Partial List of Performers on the Debut Series

- Inon Barnatan
- Cantus
- Daniil Trifonov
- Danish String Quartet
- Sol Gabetta
- Pacifica String Quartet
- Anthony McGill
- Pavel Haas Quartet
- Benjmain Grosvenor
- Igor Levitt
- Jennifer Koh
- Shai Wosner
- Tara Erraught
- Denis Kozhukin
- Paul Appleby
- Vilde Frang
- Milos
- Susanna Phillips
- Nicholas Phan
- Beatrice Rana

=== Stave Sessions ===
Stave Sessions is a music festival of new and genre expanding performers started by Celebrity Series in 2015. The festival was created to spotlight innovative and path-breaking contemporary music. Stave Sessions is a festival of discovery and experimentation. The series took place at 160 Massachusetts Avenue on the Berklee College of Music campus. In 2023, Stave Sessions moved to Somerville's Crystal Ballroom in Davis Square.

Partial List of Stave Sessions Performers

- Becca Stevens Band
- Ben Sollee
- Brooklyn Rider
- Darcy James Argue’s Secret Society
- Gabriel Kahane
- Glenn Kotche
- Kate Davis
- Kneebody + Daedelus = Kneedelus
- Melissa Aldana
- My Brightest Diamond
- Roomful of Teeth
- Sam Amidon
- Sō Percussion with Buke and Gase
- Sybarite5
- Third Coast Percussion
- TIGUE
- Innov Gnawa
- yMusic

== Past programs ==
=== AileyCamp Boston ===
AileyCamp Boston is a six-week, summer day camp that combines dance instruction with personal development workshops, creative communication classes and field trips. Founded in 2000 and based on a structural model provided by the Alvin Ailey Dance Foundation as a template for camps across the country, the AileyCamp program is designed to help low-income students develop self-respect, confidence, discipline and imagination while fostering an appreciation for the joy of dance. The goal is not to train students to be professional dancers, but to challenge the participants and to strengthen their self-esteem. The camp celebrated its tenth anniversary at its closing performance on Thursday, August 6, 2009.

=== Boston Marquee ===
The Celebrity Series Boston Marquee series, which grew out of the Celebrity Series' Emerging Artists series, was inaugurated in the 2000-01 season. Boston Marquee sought to provide new creative opportunities for Boston artists and to offer new experiences for Boston audiences by commissioning new works, encouraging artistic collaborations and making resources available to artists. Among the artists who appeared on Boston Marquee are pianists Judith Gordon, Craig Smith, and Robert D. Levin, soprano Lorraine Hunt Lieberson, mezzo-soprano Jan Curtis, dancer Julie Ince Thompson, the Boston Trio, Sol y Canto, the Nicola Hawkins Dance Company, Rebecca Rice Dance, violinist Stefan Jackiw and Emmanuel Music. Though Boston artists remain an important part of Celebrity Series presentations, the Boston Marquee series was suspended prior to the 2008-09 season.

== Collaborations ==
The Celebrity Series regularly collaborates with other Boston-area arts organizations. Most often these collaborations take the form of co-presentations. Past and present collaborative partners include The Wang Center for the Performing Arts, World Music, Broadway in Boston, Dance Umbrella, the Boston Early Music Festival, Boston Symphony Orchestra and the Handel and Haydn Society.

== History ==
Below is a partial list of performers by genre presented by the Celebrity Series of Boston since its founding:

=== Music performances ===
==== Pianists in Recital ====
- Claudio Arrau
- Daniel Barenboim
- Alfred Brendel
- Van Cliburn
- Leon Fleisher
- Boris Goldovsky
- Richard Goode
- Judith Gordon
- Glenn Gould
- Horacio Gutierrez
- Vladimir Horowitz
- Evgeny Kissin
- Robert Levin
- Radu Lupu
- Moura Lympany
- Olivier Messiaen (piano duo with Yvonne Loriod)
- Arturo Benedetti Michelangeli
- Garrick Ohlsson
- Ignace Jan Paderewski
- Murray Perahia
- Maurizio Pollini
- Awadagin Pratt
- Sergei Rachmaninoff
- Sviatoslav Richter
- Artur Rubinstein
- Sergey Schepkin
- Andras Schiff
- Rudolf Serkin
- Russell Sherman
- Jan Smeterlin
- Solomon
- Dubravka Tomsic
- Daniil Trifonov
- André Watts
- Krystian Zimerman

==== Violinists in Recital ====
- Joshua Bell
- Adolf Busch
- Mischa Elman
- Hilary Hahn
- Jascha Heifetz
- Fritz Kreisler
- Yehudi Menuhin
- Midori
- Nathan Milstein
- Anne-Sophie Mutter
- Itzhak Perlman
- Gil Shaham
- Isaac Stern
- Josef Szigeti
- Efrem Zimbalist

==== Cellists in Recital ====
- Matt Haimovitz
- Lynn Harrell
- Yo-Yo Ma
- Gregor Piatigorsky
- Jacqueline du Pré
- Mstislav Rostropovich
- Alisa Weilerstein

==== Classical vocalists in Recital ====
- Marian Anderson
- Cecilia Bartoli
- Pierre Bernac with Francis Poulenc
- Benjamin Britten with tenor Peter Pears
- Maria Callas
- Renée Fleming
- Roland Hayes
- Marilyn Horne
- Dawn Upshaw
- Lorraine Hunt Lieberson
- Birgit Nilsson
- Jessye Norman
- Luciano Pavarotti
- Ezio Pinza
- Lily Pons
- Leontyne Price
- Elisabeth Schwarzkopf
- Beverly Sills
- Dawn Upshaw
- Deborah Voigt

==== Guitarists in Recital ====
- Andrés Segovia
- Carlos Montoya
- Christopher Parkening
- John Williams
- Julian Bream

==== Orchestras ====
- Atlanta Symphony Orchestra
- Baltimore Symphony Orchestra
- BBC Symphony
- Berlin Philharmonic
- Chicago Symphony Orchestra
- Cincinnati Symphony Orchestra
- Cleveland Orchestra
- Detroit Symphony
- Dresden Staatskapelle
- Hague Philharmonic
- Houston Symphony
- Israel Philharmonic
- Leipzig Gewandhaus Orchestra
- London Symphony Orchestra
- Los Angeles Philharmonic
- Minneapolis Symphony Orchestra
- Moscow Philharmonic
- National Symphony Orchestra
- NBC Symphony Orchestra
- New Philharmonia Orchestra of London
- New York Philharmonic
- L'Orchestre du Capitole de Toulouse
- L'Orchestre de la Suisse Romande
- Orchestre de Paris
- Orchestre National de France
- Philadelphia Orchestra
- Pittsburgh Symphony Orchestra
- Royal Concertgebouw Orchestra
- Royal Philharmonic Orchestra
- San Francisco Symphony
- St. Petersburg Philharmonic (and Leningrad Philharmonic)
- Stockholm Philharmonic
- Vienna Philharmonic
- Vienna Symphony Orchestra
- Warsaw Philharmonic

==== Conductors ====
- André Previn
- Antal Doráti
- Arturo Toscanini
- Bernard Haitink
- Carlo Maria Giulini
- Charles Dutoit
- Charles Münch
- Christoph von Dohnányi
- Claudio Abbado
- Daniel Barenboim
- Dennis Russell Davies
- Edo de Waart
- Eduard van Beinum
- Eugene Ormandy
- Frans Brüggen
- George Szell
- Gil Rose
- Herbert Blomstedt
- Herbert von Karajan
- Igor Stravinsky (conducting his own works)
- Karl Böhm
- Kurt Masur
- Leonard Bernstein
- Leonard Slatkin
- Leopold Stokowski
- Lorin Maazel
- Mariss Jansons
- Michael Tilson Thomas
- Mstislav Rostropovich
- Neville Marriner
- Nikolaus Harnoncourt
- Pierre Boulez
- Pierre Monteux
- Rafael Frühbeck de Burgos
- Rafael Kubelík
- Riccardo Chailly
- Seiji Ozawa
- Sir Georg Solti
- Vladimir Ashkenazy
- Vladimir Spivakov
- Wilhelm Furtwängler
- Wolfgang Sawallisch
- Yehudi Menuhin
- Yuri Temirkanov
- Zubin Mehta

==== Chamber Ensembles ====
- Academy of St Martin in the Fields
- Alban Berg Quartet
- Amadeus Quartet
- Artemis String Quartet
- Beaux Arts Trio
- Béla Bartók (with Benny Goodman and Josef Szigeti)
- Berlin Philharmonic Octet
- Borromeo String Quartet
- Boston Musica Viva
- Budapest String Quartet
- eighth blackbird
- Emerson String Quartet
- ETHEL
- Guarneri Quartet
- I Musici
- I Solisti de Zagreb
- Juilliard String Quartet
- Kalichstein-Laredo-Robinson Trio
- Kronos Quartet
- Los Angeles Guitar Quartet
- Music from Marlboro
- Mutter-Previn-Harrell Trio
- New England String Ensemble
- Orpheus Chamber Orchestra
- Paganini Quartet
- Quartetto Italiano
- Reginald Kell Chamber Players
- Romeros Guitar Quartet
- St. Lawrence String Quartet
- Takács Quartet
- Tokyo String Quartet
- Trieste Trio
- Triple Helix
- Vienna Octet
- Virtuosi di Roma

==== Jazz Performers ====
- Benny Goodman (with Béla Bartók and violinist Josef Szigeti)
- Bobby McFerrin
- Terence Blanchard
- Lester Bowie
- Dave Brubeck
- Chick Corea
- Dave Holland
- Diana Krall
- Dizzy Gillespie
- Herbie Hancock
- Vijay Iyer
- Charles Lloyd
- Gerry Mulligan
- Joe Lovano
- Christian McBride
- Maria Schneider Orchestra
- Mel Tormé
- Mingus Big Band
- Modern Jazz Quartet
- Preservation Hall Jazz Band
- Branford Marsalis
- Wynton Marsalis
- Cecile McLorin Salvant
- SFJAZZ Collective

==== Miscellaneous Musical Performers ====
- Burl Ives
- Joni Mitchell
- Maurice Chevalier
- Kathy Mattea
- Ravi Shankar
- The Chieftains
- Trapp Family Singers
- Victor Borge
- Rob Kapilow, Family Musik and What Makes It Great?
- Del McCoury

=== Dance Performances ===
- Agnes de Mille Dance Theatre
- Alvin Ailey American Dance Theater
- American Ballet Theatre
- Ballet Folklorico de Mexico
- Ballet Russe de Monte Carlo
- BeijingDance/LDTX
- Bejart Ballet of the Twentieth Century
- Bolshoi Ballet
- Dance Theatre of Harlem
- Destine Haitian Dance Company
- Geoffrey Holder Dance Company
- Hubbard Street Dance Chicago
- Iva Kitchell
- Joffrey Ballet
- Jooss European Ballet
- Jose Greco & his Spanish Dancers
- Jose Limón Dance Company
- Katherine Dunham
- Kirov Ballet
- Mark Morris Dance Group
- Martha Graham and Company
- Merce Cunningham Dance Company
- Moiseyev Dance Company
- Original Ballet Russe
- Paul Taylor Dance Company
- Pearl Primus Dance Company
- Pilobolus (dance company)
- Sadlers Wells Ballet/Royal Ballet
- Sankai Juku
- Seán Curran Company
- Trudi Schoop and her Dancing Comedians
- Twyla Tharp Dance
- Uday Shankar and his Hindu Ballet

=== Theatre/Spoken Word Performances ===
- Alexander McCall Smith
- Basil Twist
- Bette Davis
- Bristol Old Vic
- Carol Burnett
- Cornelia Otis Skinner
- Dame Judith Anderson as Hamlet
- David Rakoff
- David Sedaris
- Emlyn Williams as Charles Dickens
- Frank Rich
- Garrison Keillor
- Hal Holbrook in "Mark Twain Tonight!"
- Ira Glass
- Ruth Draper
- Sarah Vowell
- Sir Thomas Beecham
- Spalding Gray
- Terry Gross

=== Boston debuts ===
Many nationally and internationally recognized artists have made their Boston debuts with the Celebrity Series. They include:

- Alvin Ailey American Dance Theater
- Cellist Yo-Yo Ma
- Flutist Jean-Pierre Rampal
- Pianist Emanuel Ax
- Dance Theatre of Harlem
- Wynton Marsalis Septet
- Mitsuko Shirai
- Bournemouth Symphony Orchestra
- Hagen Quartet
- Roby Lakatos Ensemble
- Calgary Philharmonic Orchestra
- Orpheus Chamber Orchestra
- Baritone Thomas Hampson
- Jazz at Lincoln Center Orchestra (Jazz at Lincoln Center)
- Soprano Dawn Upshaw
- Mezzo-soprano Cecilia Bartoli
- Violinist Nadja Salerno-Sonnenberg
- Aszure Barton and Artists
- Circa
- BeijingDance/LDTX
- Violinist Joshua Bell
- Emerson String Quartet
- Sächsische Staatskapelle Dresden
- Soprano Leontyne Price
- Pianist Angela Hewitt
- Pianist Ingrid Fliter
- Inbal Pinto & Avshalom Pollak Dance Company
- Pianist Paul Lewis
- The Goat Rodeo Sessions
