= Walter Pierce (impresario) =

American impresario (1930–2022)

- Born: November 1, 1930; Cambridge, Massachusetts, United States
- Died: 7 July 2022 (aged 91); Cambridge, Massachusetts, United States
- Education: Boston University
- Known for: impresario, promoter, arts administrator

Walter Pierce (November 1, 1930 – July 7, 2022) was a performing arts impresario who, from 1965 until 1996, presented, managed, and promoted over 1500 music, dance, and theater events in Boston under the auspices of the Celebrity Series of Boston. Pierce also served as president of the International Society for the Performing Arts in 1976 and 1977.

== Education and early employment ==
Walter Pierce graduated from Rindge Technical High School in Cambridge, Massachusetts in 1947 and from Boston University in 1952. He was drafted into the US Army in September 1952, and served two years, eighteen months in Germany.

Following his discharge, Pierce moved to New York City, working for the advertising firm of Ruthrauff and Ryan before joining the theatrical publicity firm of Max Eisen. While with Max Eisen, Pierce promoted Broadway and off-Broadway shows, including Yiddish Theatre productions, and the summer tent productions of St. John Terrell who conceived ‘Broadway under the big top,’ the presentation of musical theatre in the round under a circus tent, also known as Music Circus.

Pierce returned to Boston to pursue a master's degree in Public Relations at Boston University, following which Pierce joined the South Shore Music Circus, a summer tent theater in Cohasset, MA, as publicity director. During Cohasset’s off-season, he free-lanced as a publicist promoting the Boston premiere of Federico Fellini’s film La Strada, writing for the exhibitors’ trade magazine Motion Picture Herald and managing the opening of a foreign films theater in Milton, Massachusetts, before returning the following summer to the South Shore Music Circus.

== Celebrity Series of Boston ==
During his second season at the South Shore Music Circus, Pierce was introduced to Boston impresario Aaron Richmond, who offered him a position with the Boston University Celebrity Series that Pierce accepted, working summers at the Music Circus and at the Celebrity Series the balance of the year. Pierce left the Music Circus in 1960 to work for the Celebrity Series on a full-time basis.

Following Aaron Richmond’s death in 1965, Pierce briefly shared co-managing directorship of the Boston University Celebrity Series with Mrs. Richmond until her retirement a few years later.

Following Mrs. Richmond’s retirement, Pierce assumed the sole managing directorship of the Celebrity Series and continued in that capacity until his retirement in 1996. During that period, Pierce expanded the number of presentations from twenty-five to over forty each season.

== Creation of Project Discovery ==
In 1984, Pierce began the Celebrity Series of Boston outreach program, Project Discovery, which provided students and senior citizens an opportunity to attend Celebrity Series performances at greatly reduced prices. Pierce also developed the Emerging Artists Series which provided worthy Boston-based performers the opportunity to perform in a major Boston concert venue sponsored by the Celebrity Series. Soprano Lorraine Hunt, soprano Dominique Labelle, and baritone Christopheren Nomura; pianists Christopher Taylor and Max Levinson, the Boston Composers String Quartet and the Atlantic Brass Quintet all performed on the Series.

In addition to presenting as head of the Celebrity Series, Pierce served as artistic advisor to several New England based concert series, among them the Gile Community Concert Trust Fund concerts in Concord, New Hampshire, the Greater New Bedford Concert Association, the Portland Concert Association in Portland, Maine, the Temple Beth-El Series in Providence, Rhode Island, the Castle Hill summer concert series in Ipswich, Massachusetts, the Phillips Academy Celebrity Series in Andover, Massachusetts, the Boston Morning Musicales, the annual Gratwick concert at Milton Academy, and the Harvard Musical Association.

In 1971, the Celebrity Series merged offices with the Boston Opera Association. During this time, Pierce worked closely with Harriet O’Brien, managing director of the Boston Opera Association, sponsors of the annual one-week Boston engagement of the Metropolitan Opera. Following O’Brien’s death, he managed the Metropolitan Opera week in Boston until the company ceased touring.

== Wang Center for the Performing Arts ==
In 1984, Pierce was appointed managing director of the Wang Center for the Performing Arts. The Celebrity Series, which had been affiliated with Boston University since 1954, became known as the Wang Celebrity Series. In 1989, the Celebrity Series ended its affiliation with the Wang Center; was incorporated as an independent, non-profit organization, Celebrity Series of Boston, and with Bank of Boston as its primary corporate sponsor, became the Bank of Boston Celebrity Series. A series of bank mergers resulted in a variety of name changes for the Series: Bank Boston Celebrity Series, Fleet Boston Celebrity Series, Bank of America Celebrity Series. In June 2007, the Celebrity Series began operating under its incorporated name Celebrity Series of Boston.

When Pierce retired in 1996, Martha H. Jones was appointed Executive Director of the Celebrity Series of Boston.

== Tribute concert ==
Pierce was honored at a tribute concert in Symphony Hall on April 26, 1998. A distinguished array of performing artists participated in the tribute concert including pianist Emanuel Ax, William Bolcom and Joan Morris, Natasha Thomas-Schmitt of the Alvin Ailey American Dance Theater, the Juilliard String Quartet, Robert Mann, Yo-Yo Ma, flutist Jean-Pierre Rampal, Isaac Stern, and pianist Dubravka Tomsic. Among those in attendance at Symphony Hall and the gala dinner following the performance were famed soprano Leontyne Price and Judith Jamison, then Executive Director of the Alvin Ailey American Dance Theater. It was announced at the tribute that seat P1 in Symphony Hall was endowed in Pierce’s name, and that the Celebrity Series inaugurated the Walter Pierce Annual Performance Fund to support main stage programming as well as activities in the community.

Pierce was married for over thirty years to the former Betty Ann Brown, who died in 1994. Pierce resided in Cambridge, MA with his companion Margaret Ulmer until his passing in 2022. His daughters, Melinda Pierce and her family reside in Washington, D.C., Susannah (Pierce) Keefe and her family in Arlington, VA. He has four grandchildren.

Pierce was a member of ISPA, the International Society for the Performing Arts, for over forty years.
