= Wang Theatre =

Theater in Boston, Massachusetts

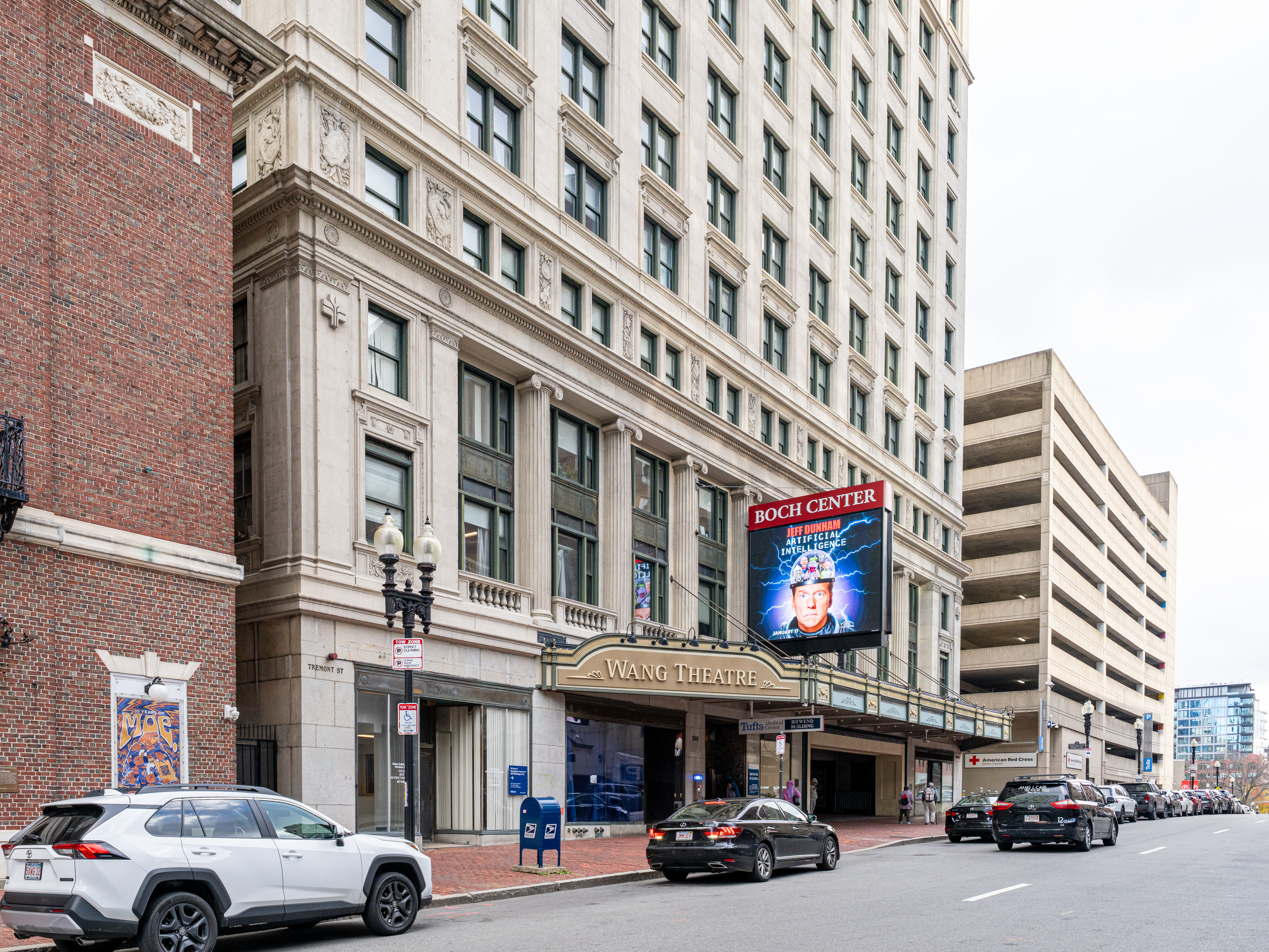
- Interactive map of Wang Theatre
- Former names: Metropolitan Theatre (1925–1962); Music Hall (1962–1980)
- Address: 270 Tremont St.
- Location: Boston, Massachusetts
- Owner: Boch Center
- Operator: Boch Center; Madison Square Garden Company (co-booking)
- Capacity: 3,500
- Type: Theatre
- Public transit: Tufts Medical Center (Orange Line); Boylston (Green Line)

Construction
- Opened: 1925

Website
- https://www.bochcenter.org
- Metropolitan Theatre
- U.S. National Register of Historic Places
- Location within Boston Location within Massachusetts Location within the United States
- Coordinates: 42°21′1″N 71°3′53″W
- Built: 1923
- Architects: Blackall, Clapp & Whittemore; Multiple
- Architectural style: Renaissance
- MPS: Boston Theatre MRA
- NRHP reference No.: 80000445
- Added to NRHP: December 9, 1980

The Wang Theatre is a theater in Boston, Massachusetts, United States. It originally opened in 1925 as the Metropolitan Theatre and was later renamed the Music Hall. It was designed by Clarence Blackall and is located at 252–272 Tremont Street in the Boston Theatre District. The theatre is operated as part of the Boch Center. The theatre was designated as a Boston Landmark by the Boston Landmarks Commission in 1990.

== Metropolitan Theatre ==
The structure was originally known as the Metropolitan Theatre when it opened in 1925. The Metropolitan Theatre was developed by Max Shoolman and designed by architect Clarence Blackall, with the assistance of Detroit theatre architect C. Howard Crane. It seats more than 3,600 people.

== Music Hall ==
In 1962 it became the home of the Boston Ballet and was renamed the Music Hall. During the 1960s and 1970s, audiences could see the Stuttgart Opera, the Metropolitan Opera, Bolshoi Ballet and Kirov Ballet as well as popular movies and performing artists. With time, though, the venue could no longer attract the large touring companies because of the size of its stage as well as its outdated production facilities. Converted to a non-profit center in 1980 and renamed the Metropolitan Center, it was able to attract theatrical performances again.

The Grateful Dead played at the Boston Music Hall 16 times between 1971 and 1978, with the New Riders of the Purple Sage joining them for their April 1971 shows.

Bob Marley and the Wailers' 1978 concert at the Music Hall was released in 2015 in honor of Bob Marley's 70th birthday as Easy Skanking in Boston '78.

== Wang Center ==
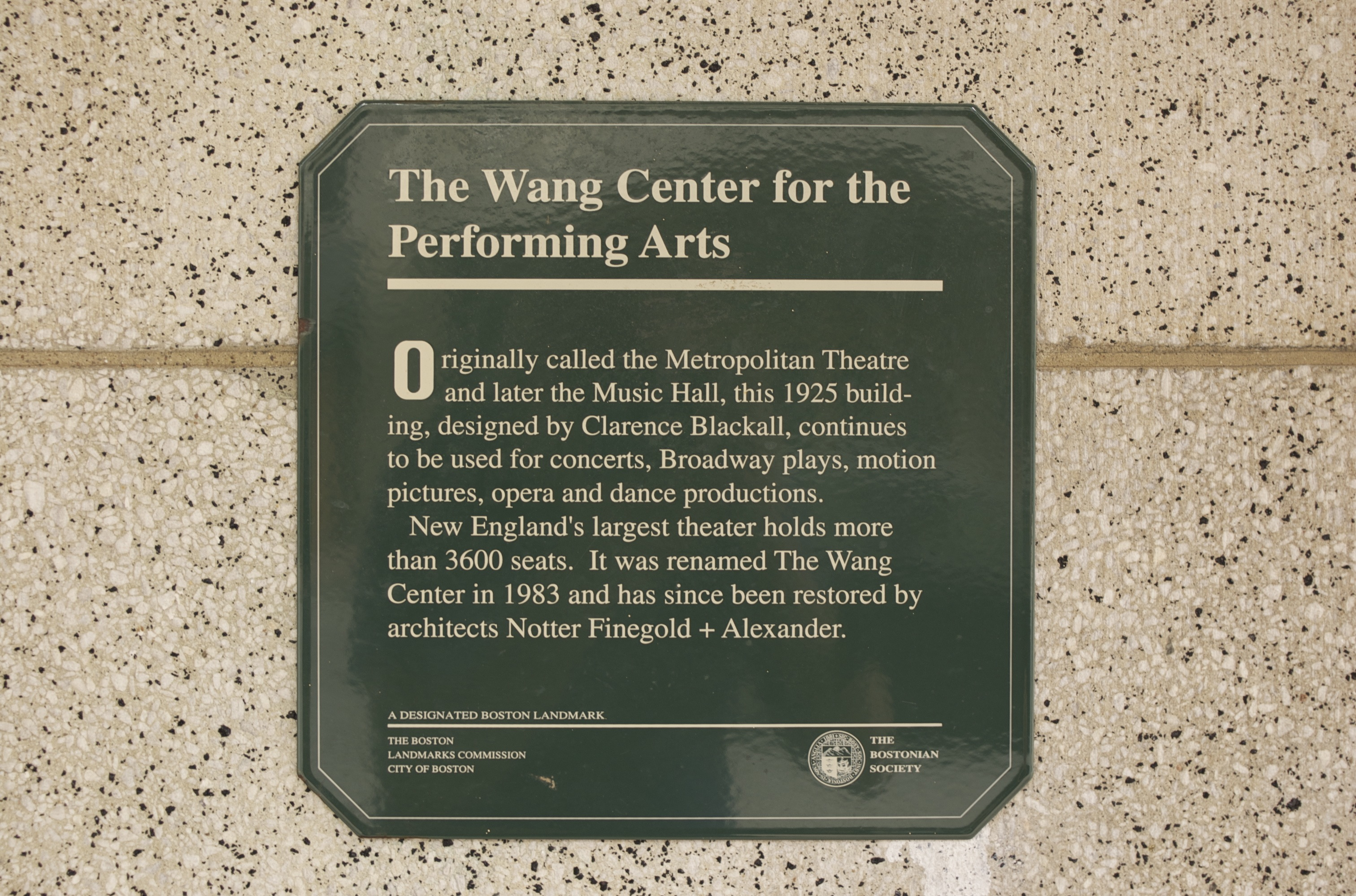
Plaque adorning the front of Wang Theatre

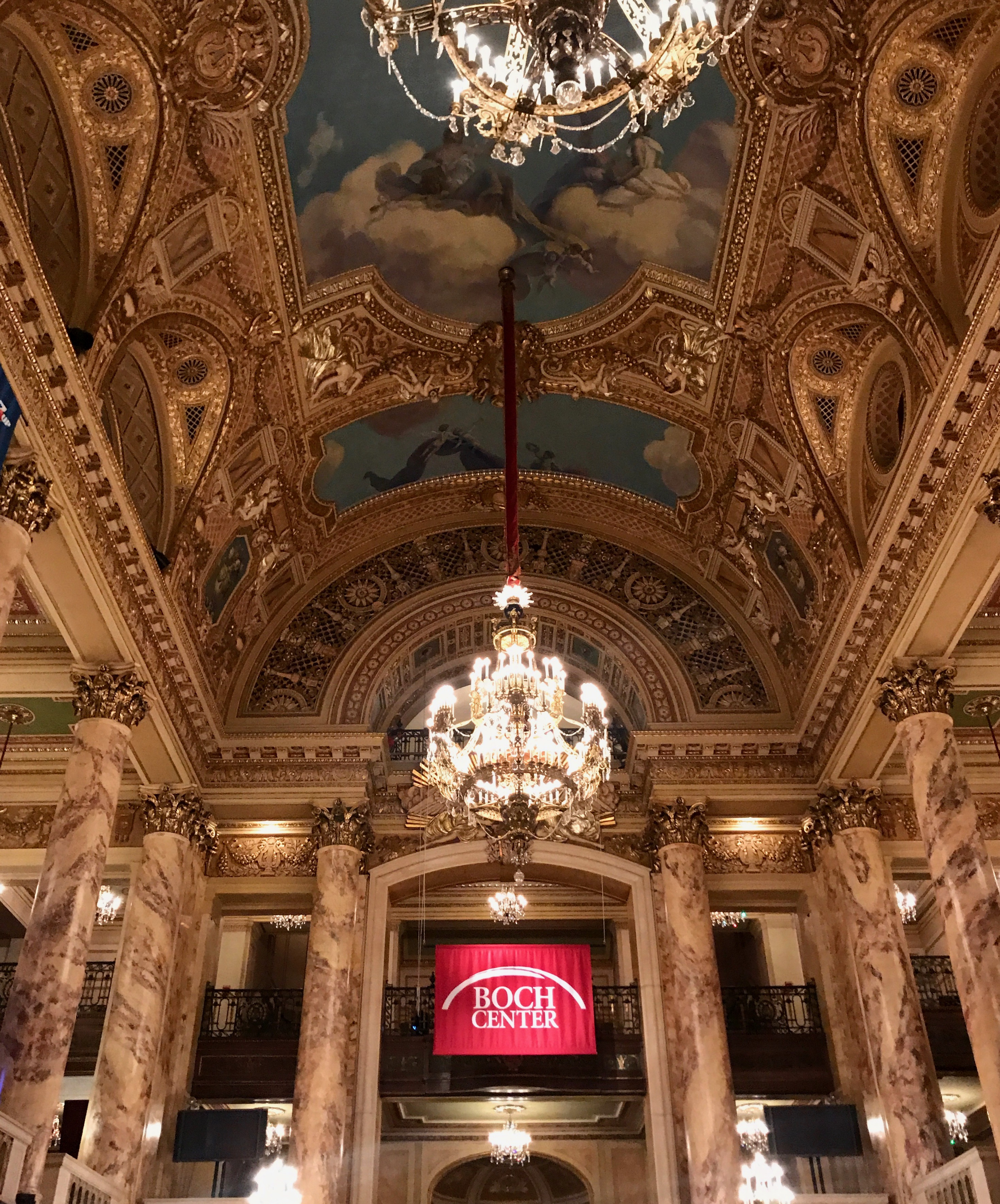
Lobby Interior

In 1983, Dr. An Wang made a very large donation, and the theater became the Wang Center. From 1989–1992, $9.8 million was raised to restore the Theatre to "its glory days of the 1920s". Boston based architecture firm Finegold Alexander & Associates restored the theatre with Conrad Schmitt Studios performing the elegant decoration, gilded moldings, murals, scagliola and marbleized surfaces.

In 2008, the Citi Performing Arts Center announced a co-booking arrangement with The Madison Square Garden Company for the Wang Theatre.

The lobby was used in the movies American Hustle, for the live band performance and casino scenes, and The Witches of Eastwick, as part of the house in which Jack Nicholson's character lived. It was also used for numerous scenes in the ABC TV pilot Gilded Lilys.

== See also ==
- National Register of Historic Places listings in northern Boston, Massachusetts
