= Winifred Byrd =

American concert pianist (1884–1970)

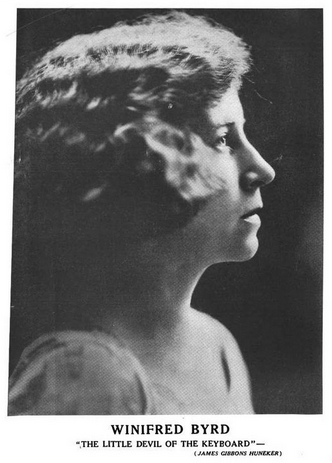
- Winifred Byrd, from a 1919 publication

Background information
- Born: May 24, 1884; Los Angeles, California, United States
- Died: 3 April 1970 (aged 85) Denver, Colorado, United States
- Genres: Classical
- Occupations: Pianist, Educator

Winifred Byrd (May 24, 1884 in Salem, Oregon – April 3, 1970 in Los Angeles, California) was an American concert pianist and educator.

Byrd attended Willamette University and graduated from New England Conservatory (NEC) in 1905. While studying at NEC she won the Spaulding scholarship. Byrd taught for a time at NEC shortly after her graduation.

Byrd studied in Boston with Madame Hopekirk, Carl Baermann, and Theresa Carreño and eventually taught music at Olivet College in Olivet, Michigan.

Byrd made her New York debut on February 27, 1918, and went on to perform in Chicago, Boston, Portland, Oregon, and San Francisco. Impresario Aaron Richmond presented Byrd in Boston in 1925, billing her as "America's Pianist." James Huneker, reviewing a Byrd recital for The New York Times on November 4, 1918, wrote, "She blazes with temperament. She has the energy of a demon." Hunecker also noted Byrd's "Buster Brown coiffure".

Byrd made at least ten Duo-Art reproducing piano rolls, including Franz Liszt's "Dance of the Gnomes", from Concert Étude No. 2, and Chopin's Preludes, Opus 28, No. 1 in C major and No. 23 in F major, for the Aeolian Company.

In July 1925, Byrd sustained fractured ribs when she was struck by a car on New York's 5th Avenue.
