= Concert tour =

Run of an artist's concerts at multiple locations

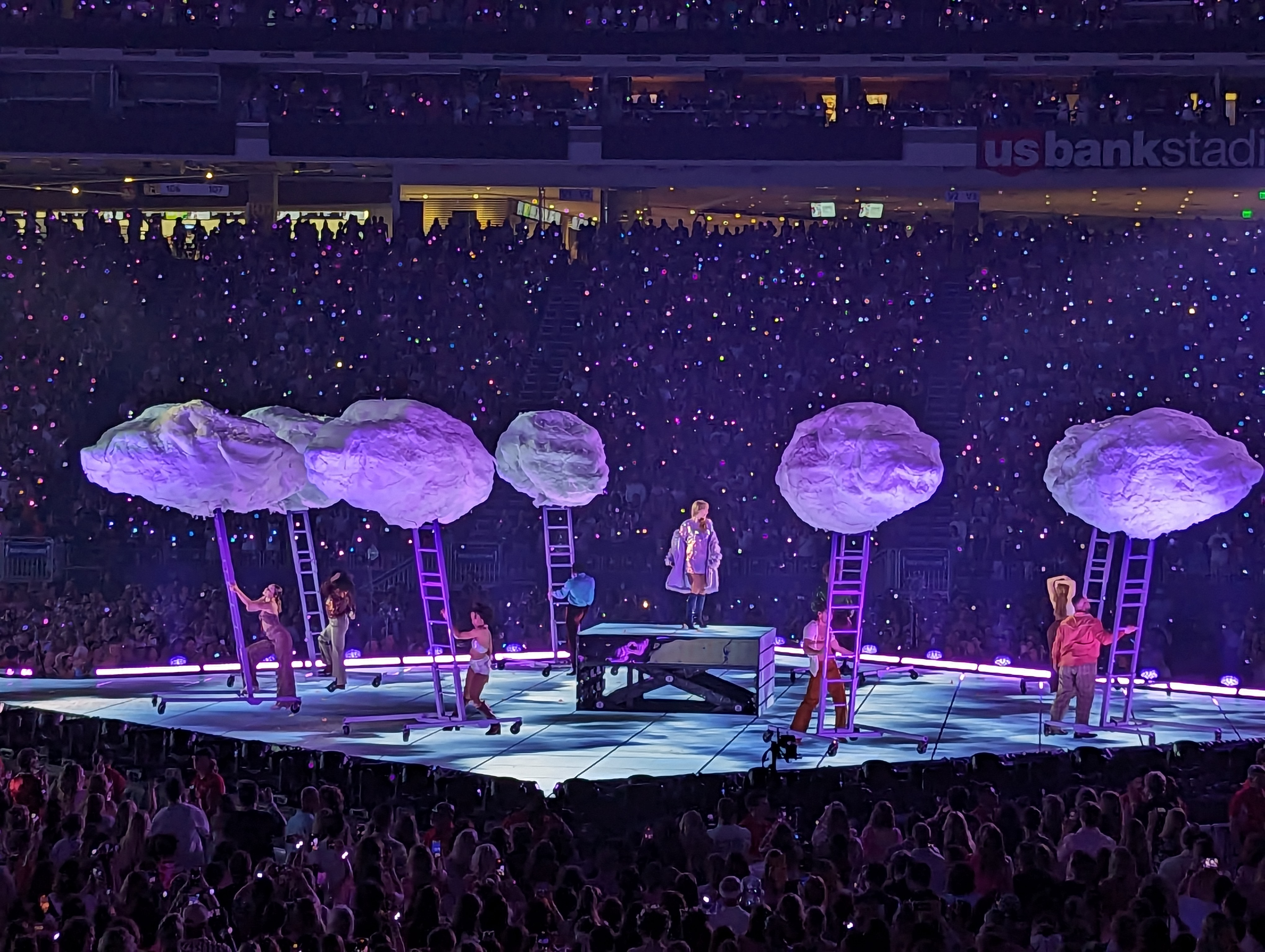
Taylor Swift performing at the Eras Tour, the highest-grossing concert tour of all time

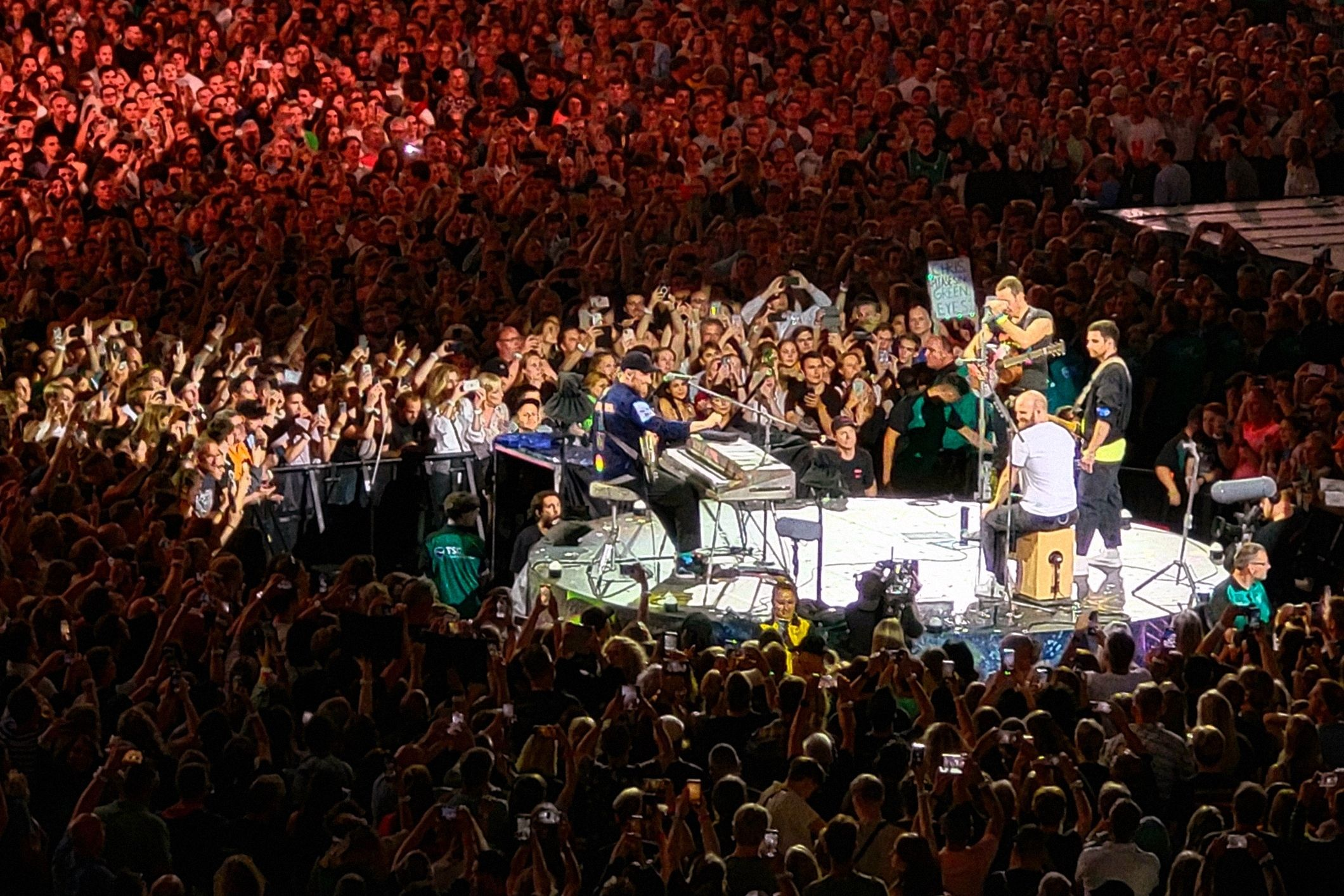
Coldplay performing at the Music of the Spheres World Tour, the most-attended concert tour of all time

A concert tour, or simply tour, is a series of concerts by an artist or group of artists in different cities or locations. Often, concert tours are named to differentiate different tours by the same artist and to associate a specific tour with a particular album or product. Especially in the popular music world, such tours can become large-scale enterprises that last for several months or even years, are seen by hundreds of thousands or millions of people, and bring in millions of dollars in ticket revenues. A performer who embarks on a concert tour is called a touring artist.

Different segments of longer concert tours are known as "legs". The different legs of a tour are denoted in different ways, dependent on the artist and type of tour, but the most common means of separating legs are dates (especially if there is a long break at some point), countries and/or continents, or different opening acts. In the largest concert tours, it has become more common for different legs to employ separate touring production crews and equipment, local to each geographical region. Concert tours are often administered on the local level by concert promoters or by performing arts presenters. Usually, small concert tours are managed by a road manager whereas large concert tours are managed by a tour manager.

== Logistics ==
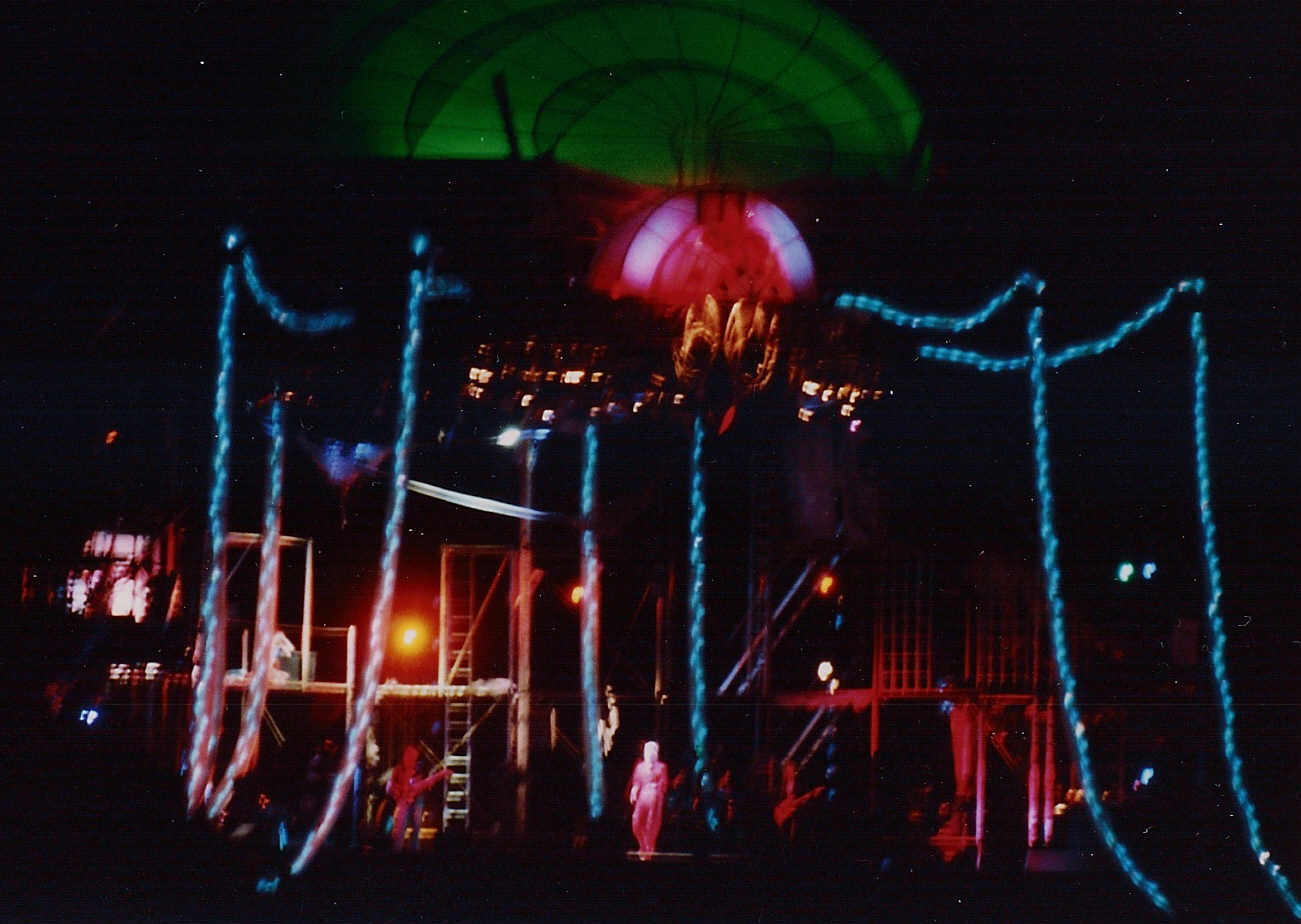
David Bowie's Glass Spider Tour stage (1987), then the largest touring set. Reportedly, it took 43 trucks to move the set.

The main challenge for concert tours is moving the show's structure from one venue to another, especially on transcontinental runs. Logistics should be significantly organized and everything has to happen on the planned time. Autoweek estimated that 30 to 50 trucks were required for Taylor Swift's 1989 World Tour (2015). Her subsequent Reputation (2018) and Eras (2023–2024) tours increased that number to 80 and 90 semitrucks, including stages, equipment, props and clothes.

BBC News reported that Beyoncé used seven Boeing 747 air freighters and more than 70 trucks to bring the Formation World Tour (2016) to the United Kingdom. This phase of the logistic process did not include transportation of the backstage staff, musicians, performers and the singer herself. Coldplay's Music of the Spheres World Tour (2022–2025), which received praise for its sustainability efforts, had about 30 trucks and 10 buses in total. The fleet consisted of electric vehicles or was fueled with biofuel whenever possible.

== Themes and types ==
The majority of concert tours are part of a promotional campaign to support an album release. Hence, new songs from the respective album are included on its tour's setlist. Some tours are known as "greatest hits tours" or "reunion tour" without any new material or specific album release, such as Fleetwood Mac's 2009 Unleashed tour and No Doubt's 2009 Summer Tour. Taylor Swift's The Eras Tour (2023–2024) is a retrospective of her career to that point, where each act of the concert represents one of her albums. In another case, artists embark on a concert tour to celebrate the anniversary of their past albums, such as U2's 2017 tour to mark the 30th anniversary of The Joshua Tree (1987) and Janet Jackson's 2019 tour to commemorate the 30th anniversary of Janet Jackson's Rhythm Nation 1814 (1989).

=== Farewell tour ===
A farewell tour is a concert tour intended to signal the retirement of a singer, the disbanding of a band, or the end of a show's run. Many of the tours end up not being the last tour, with frequent regroupings, or revivals of shows. Luciano Pavarotti's 2004 tour and Kenny Rogers's 2015–2017 tour are examples of farewell tours which were the last to be staged before their deaths.

=== Residency tour ===
A residency tour is a concert tour comprising a series of residencies in different cities (a hybrid of "residency" and "tour" formats). Pollstar defined the residency as a run of 10 shows or more at a single venue. In 2019, Madonna became the first mainstream artist to embark on a residency tour, with her all-theater Madame X Tour. It included 16 shows at the Howard Gilman Opera House (New York), 10 shows at the Wiltern Theatre (Los Angeles), and 12 shows at the London Palladium. After playing a record-breaking 15 shows at the Madison Square Garden (New York) during his Love on Tour (2021–2023), Harry Styles took the residency-touring format into a larger scale, with his 2026–2027 tour Together, Together. During the latter tour, he played 10 shows at the Johan Cruyff Arena (Amsterdam), 12 shows at the Wembley Stadium (London), and 30 shows at the Madison Square Garden.

== Revenue ==
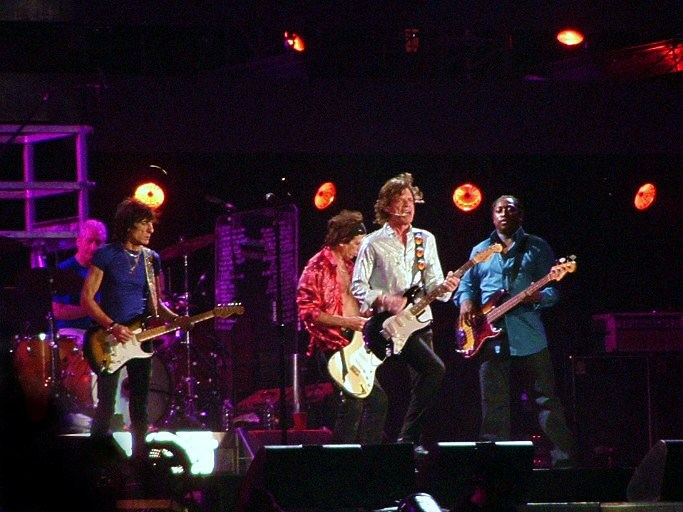
A Bigger Bang Tour by the Rolling Stones remained the all-time highest-grossing tour for 11 years (1995–2006).

As of October 2024, the highest-grossing concert tour of all time is Taylor Swift's Eras Tour, with $2.089 billion earned from 149 shows. It was the first run to collect over $1 and $2 billion in revenue. Coldplay's Music of the Spheres World Tour ranks at second place, being the most-attended tour in history and the first by a group to reach $1 billion. At third is Elton John's Farewell Yellow Brick Road, with a total gross of $939 million from 2018–2023. At fourth place is Ed Sheeran's ÷ Tour, with a gross of $776.2 million. On fifth place is U2's 360° Tour, with $736.4 million.

Global touring revenue reported to Billboard Boxscore exceeded $5.5 billion in 2016. Due to the collapse of record sales in the 21st century, concert tours have become a major source of income for recording artists. Besides the tickets, touring also generates money from the sales of merchandise and meet-and-greet packages. However, the touring business suffered in the early 2020s because of the COVID-19 pandemic. Pollstar estimated the total lost revenue for the industry in 2020 at more than $30 billion.

== Response ==
The mobility of concert tours requires a lot of costs, time, and energy. It is very common for musicians to not see family members for over a year during their touring. British singer Adele expressed her unhappiness of concert tours, saying "Touring is a peculiar thing, it doesn't suit me particularly well. I'm a real homebody and I get so much joy in the small things." A concert residency concept is offered as an alternative to performers who just need to stay in one venue and the fans come to see them. American singer Lady Gaga, who cancelled the 2018 European leg of her Joanne World Tour, signed for a Las Vegas residency to help manage her fibromyalgia illness, which can be exacerbated by touring.

The 2015 study by charity Help Musicians found that over 60% of musicians suffered from depression or other psychological issues, with touring an issue for 71% of respondents.

== See also ==
- Lists of concert tours
- On Air (streaming service) (Live concert streams)
