= New England String Ensemble =

New England String Ensemble was founded in 1993 by violinist Peter Stickel and cellist John Bumstead to champion strings in performance and education. The ensemble consists of 26 professional string musicians who perform four concert programs a year at both the Rogers Center for the Arts in North Andover, Massachusetts and New England Conservatory's Jordan Hall in Boston, Massachusetts. It is led by conductor and music director, Federico Cortese, and performs music from the 17th century to the present.

== History ==
The New England String Ensemble began its inaugural concert season in 1994 under the guidance of founding music director, Christophe Chagnard, a native of Paris and resident of Seattle, who commuted to Boston for four years to help build the orchestra. Mr. Chagnard is also co-founder and music director of Seattle's award-winning Northwest Sinfonietta.

The inaugural performance, A Musical Journey into Night, in September 1994 at Endicott College in Beverly, Massachusetts received international attention, including pieces in the New York Times and newspapers in Seattle, Paris and Tel Aviv as well as a feature by Paul Harvey, for its life-imitating-art triumph over a thunderstorm-induced power failure.

In its fifth season, the 1998–99 season, the New England String Ensemble featured four finalists in its search for a local music director from which vocalist and conductor, Susan Davenny Wyner, was chosen to lead the orchestra into its sixth season, 1999–2000. That sixth season also featured a move into Cambridge, Massachusetts, with a series at the First Church Congregational at the invitation of keyboard artist Peter Sykes. A gradual migration into the Sanders Theatre at Harvard University and then to the Jordan Hall at the New England Conservatory in Boston completed the progression.

Under the direction of Ms. Wyner, the artistic success of the New England String Ensemble was evidenced locally by growing audiences, high critical acclaim, and performance invitations, such as an invitation to the Bank of America Celebrity Series in 2004–05. National recognition included a Koussevitzky commission, one of seven in the United States awarded in 2003–04. Ms. Wyner resigned her position in April 2005 to pursue opera.

In July 2005, Federico Cortese was engaged as conductor for the 2005–06 season and named music director in 2006. From the moment of his debut as assistant conductor of the Boston Symphony Orchestra in 1998, stepping in at short notice to conduct Beethoven Symphony No. 9 in place of an ailing Seiji Ozawa, Cortese's work with the Boston Symphony Orchestra was widely praised. His other appointments include music director and associate conductor of the Spoleto Festival in Italy; assistant conductor to Daniele Gatti at the Orchestra dell'Accademia Nazionale di Santa Cecilia in Rome; and assistant conductor to Robert Spano at the Brooklyn Philharmonic. Additionally, he has served as music director of the Greater Boston Youth Symphony Orchestras since 1999.

== Mission and educational programs ==
The mission of New England String Ensemble is to "engage, educate, and inspire with passionate string orchestra performances and innovative community programs."

Initially starting with a String Competition in 1996, the New England String Ensemble's educational programs have expanded to support four community initiatives for students in grades K-12 that provide a progression from beginning to advanced students. The programs include:

- String Fever — a program for elementary age students that introduces them to string instruments and classical music.
- Kids to Concerts – middle school string players are invited to attend a New England String Ensemble concert free of charge and to participate in the pre-concert talk led by music director Federico Cortese and a post-concert reception to meet the musicians.
- New England Musical Heritage Initiative – this program unites composers, high school string players, and local historians as they explore and celebrate the rich diversity of New England culture and history.
- String and Flute Competitions – competition for advanced string and flute students (18 and under) from the New England area. Scholarships are awarded to the top three winners in the Open Division and the First place winner in the Under-12 Division. The first-place winner of the Open Division also wins a solo performance with the orchestra in a regular season subscription concert.
