= Denoe Leedy =

American classical pianist, music educator and music journalist

(Charles) Denoe Leedy (born January 19, 1900, Baltimore, Maryland - d. October 23, 1964, South Hadley, Massachusetts) was a classical pianist, music educator and music journalist.

Charles Denoe Leedy was a graduate of the Peabody Institute in Baltimore, Maryland. He also studied music in New York with Harold Bauer and Ernest Bloch and in Paris with Nadia Boulanger.

(Charles) Denoe Leedy was married to Marion H. (Sarles) Leedy, a 1920 graduate of Mount Holyoke College and a fellow student of Nadia Boulanger in Paris. Their only child, Diana Leedy (Collopy), was born in 1927.

He performed as a concert pianist, both in recital and with orchestra in his early years. Among the orchestras with whom he performed were the Baltimore Symphony and the Cleveland Orchestra. Leedy performed in recital frequently in Boston on concert series' presented by Boston impresario Aaron Richmond. In November 1925 Leedy gave the Boston premieres of Aaron Copland's Passacaglia and Igor Stravinsky's Sonate at New England Conservatory's Jordan Hall.

Mr. Leedy was Chairman of the Department of Music at Mount Holyoke College from 1937 to 1958 and Professor of Music there from 1937 to 1964. He also taught at the Beaver Country Day School, Oberlin College, the Peabody Institute, and the Cleveland Institute of Music.

From 1931 to 1937 Leedy was music editor and critic for The Cleveland Press.

== Publications ==
- "Harold Randolph: The Man and Musician, The Musical Quarterly, 1944
