= University Musical Society =

The University Musical Society (UMS) is a not-for-profit performing arts presenter located on the campus of the University of Michigan in Ann Arbor, Michigan. It was established in December 1880. While UMS is affiliated with the University of Michigan and is a regular collaborator with many university units, UMS supports itself through ticket sales, foundation and government grants, corporate and individual contributions, and endowment income.

UMS now hosts approximately 75 performances and more than 100 educational events each season. UMS presents performances in different venues located in Ann Arbor, each particularly suited to the events that occur there. These venues are not owned or operated by UMS and are rented for each performance.

== History ==
UMS was founded locally in Ann Arbor, Michigan, by local townspeople, university faculty, staff, and students who came together to perform Messiah (Handel). Their first performance of Handel's Messiah was done in December 1879. The group was led by Professor Henry Simmons Frieze and conducted by Professor Calvin Cady, and they called themselves The Choral Union. Since then, the Messiah has been performed annually by the group during the holiday season.

Many members of the newly founded Choral Union were also affiliated with the university. For this reason, the University Musical Society was established in December 1880. UMS included both the University Orchestra and Choral Union. Throughout the year, the groups presented a series of concerts that featured their two groups as well as local and visiting performing artists.

UMS has continued to grow and bring in performing artists, including internationally renowned orchestras, dance and chamber ensembles, jazz, Opera, and Theatre. This year marks UMS' 144th season. UMS's current president is Matthew VanBesien, former president of the New York Philharmonic.

== Mission statement ==
To inspire individuals and enrich communities by connecting audiences and artists in uncommon and engaging experiences.
