= Rockport Music =

Music presenter in Rockport, MA

- Also known as: Rockport Chamber Music Festival
- Origin: Rockport, Massachusetts, USA
- Genres: Classical, Jazz, World, Folk, Popular
- Years active: 1981–present
- Website: http://www.rockportmusic.org

Rockport Music is a presenting organization in Rockport, Massachusetts, bringing music and other artistic programming in variety of genres to audiences in the greater Boston area and the Massachusetts North Shore. Founded in 1981 as the Rockport Chamber Music Festival, Rockport Music has been under the artistic direction of violinist/violist Barry Shiffman since 2017. From 1995-2017, the Festival was under the artistic direction of pianist David Deveau. In Summer 2010 the organization completed construction on a year-round permanent home, the Shalin Liu Performance Center. Situated on the Atlantic coast, one hour north of Boston, Rockport has long been a destination for seaside tourism and historically a fishing village and artist colony.

== Founding and history ==
Rockport Music was founded in 1981 as the Rockport Chamber Music Festival—a twelve concert series of chamber, early, and vocal music—by singer Leila Deis and composer-pianist David Alpher, who acted as co-artistic directors until 1994, in collaboration with Rockport businessman Paul Sylva.

Rockport Music has since presented numerous artists, many of whom have returned repeatedly to perform in the festival, including Andrés Diaz (cello), Garrick Ohlsson (piano), Richard Stoltzman (clarinet), Andrés Cárdenes (violin), David Leisner (guitar), Edwin Barker (bass) and Jordi Savall (viola da gamba), as well as acclaimed groups such as the Eroica Trio (piano, cello & violin), the Emerson Quartet, Borromeo, the Calder String Quartet, A Far Cry and the Canadian Brass.

The organization has also commissioned and premiered a number of compositions, including Lera Auerbach's String Quartet No. 3 & Sonata No. 1 for cello and piano, Elena Ruehr’s Song of Silkie, Mark Harvey's Rockport Blues, John Harbison’s Abu Ghraib, Bruce Adolphe’s Whispers of Mortality, and Scott Wheeler's Granite Coast.

== Performance Center and expansion ==
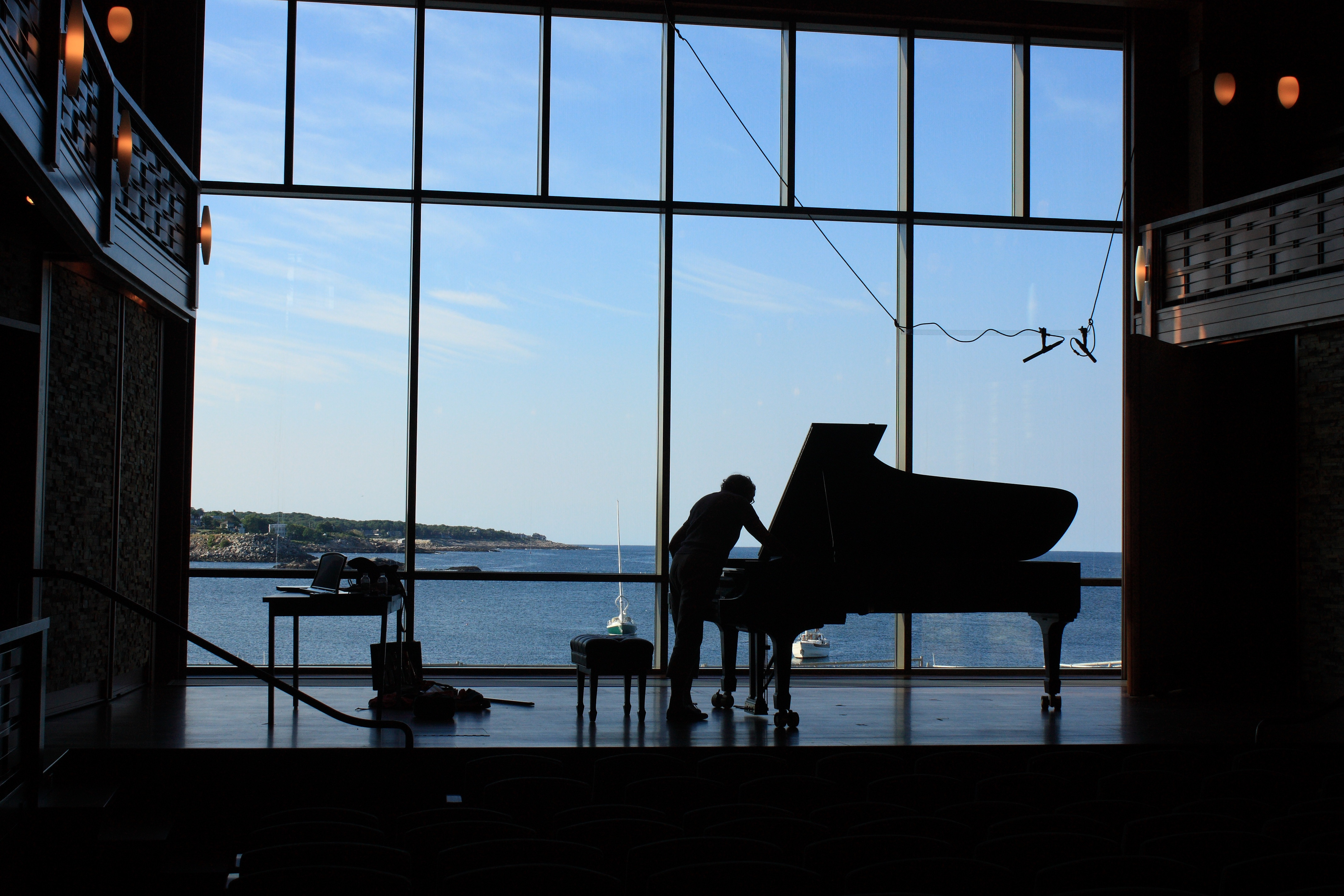
The Performance Center stage and main window.

Since the first festival in 1981, Rockport Music's concerts were hosted by the Rockport Art Association in its Hibbard and Maddocks Galleries. In 2008, under the guidance of Artistic Director David Deveau and the board of trustees, preparation began on the site of Rockport Music's new Shalin Liu Performance Center, named for the philanthropist Shalin Liu. The center opened for the summer chamber music festival in June 2010. The new facility provides seating for approximately 330 and features a third-floor reception space complete with a catering kitchen. The facility is in compliance with the American with Disabilities Act. The concert stage, set in front of a two-story window overlooking Rockport's Sandy Bay, is visible from ground level and balcony seating.

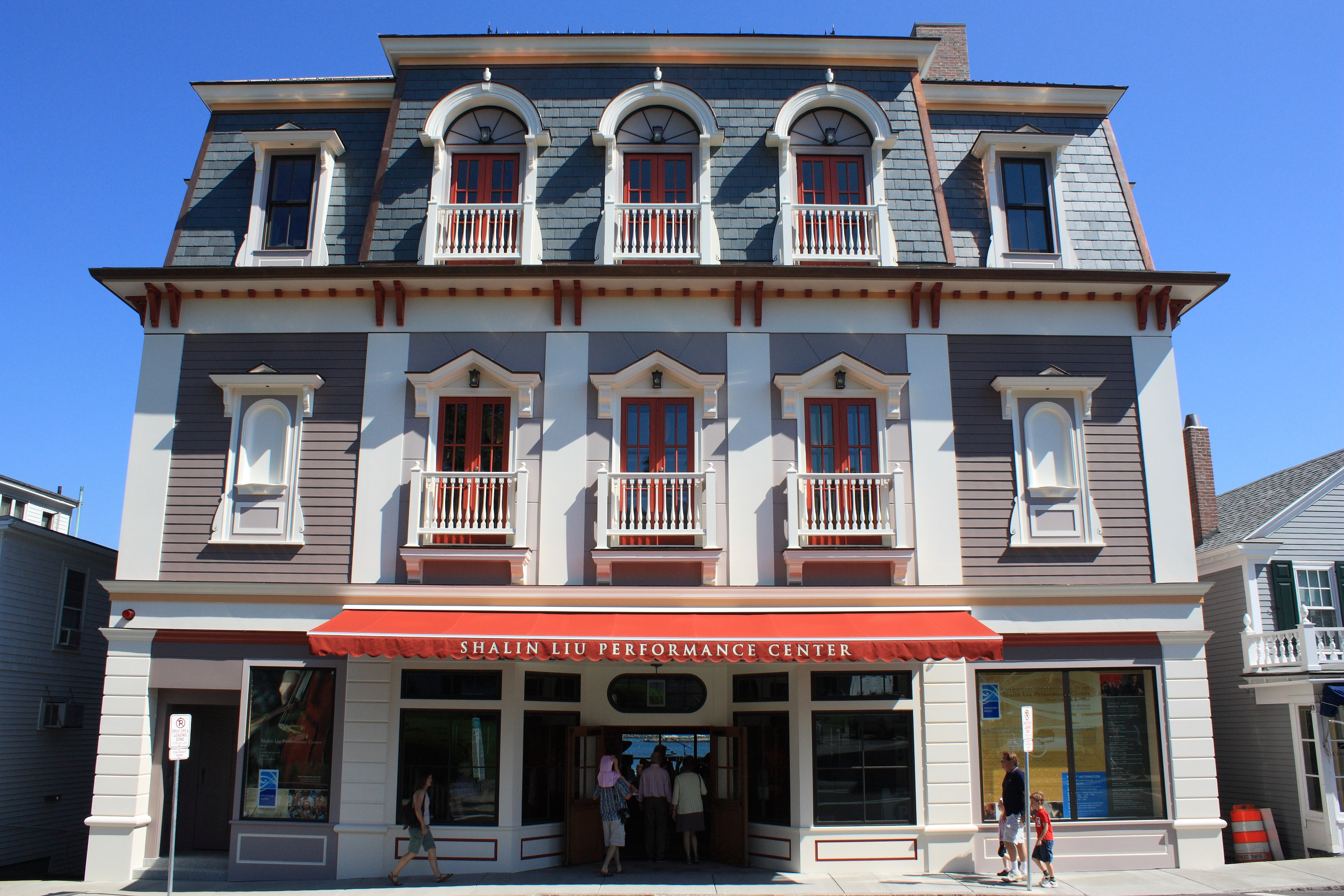
Photograph of the Performance Center facade.

Artist rendering of plans for the Shalin Liu Performance Center.

The space's design is a collaboration between architects Alan Joslin and Deborah Epstein, of Epstein Joslin Architects (Cambridge, Massachusetts) and R. Lawrence Kirkegaard, of Kirkegaard Associates (Chicago). Joslin and Kirkegaard have also collaborated on, among other projects, Tanglewood’s Ozawa Hall. Construction was executed by Consigli Construction, which has worked on numerous historical buildings in New England

Also in 2008, the organization was renamed Rockport Music to reflect the gradual expansion of its mission and activities: the Rockport Chamber Music Festival has grown from twelve to twenty-four concerts. Since the opening of the Shalin Liu Performance Center in 2010, Rockport Music has presented a great variety of artists year-round, including Midori, pianist Russell Sherman, Scottish-style fiddler Hanneke Cassel, jazz legend Dave Brubeck, folk-rocker Roger McGuinn, jazz-singer Kurt Elling, and Rockport’s own Paula Cole. The Performance Center is also equipped with high quality audio-visual systems and hosts HD broadcasts from the Metropolitan Opera and National Theatre, as well as special cinematic events, such as showings of the silent films Nosferatu and Metropolis with live musical accompaniment.

== Educational outreach ==
Rockport Music is continually developing its program of education activities for both children and adults. The organization has sponsored “mini-residencies” by accomplished musicians, wherein the artists work with students in Cape Ann’s public schools, culminating in free evening performances for the community. Since 2010, these artists have included Ten Tumbao, Jose Franch Ballester, Manguito, and the Harlem String Quartet, among others.

During the Rockport Chamber Music Festival, Rockport Music hosts a lecture series, master classes, open rehearsals, and panel discussions, as well as free performances, for residents and visitors of Rockport. Educational outreach events for youth and adults featuring over 50 events annually, serve more than 10,000 individuals.

== See also ==
- Boston Symphony Orchestra
- Cape Ann
