= Carlo Buonamici =

Carlo Buonamici (30 June 1875 — 30 September 1920) was an Italian-born American pianist and music educator who was chiefly active as both a concert pianist and piano pedagogue in the city of Boston from 1896 until his death in 1920.

== Life and career ==
Born and raised in Florence, Italy, Carlo Buonamici was the son of pianist and composer Giuseppe Buonamici. He received his initial musical training from his father who was his principal piano teacher in his youth. He was trained further at the Würzburg Music Conservatory from 1891-1894 where he was a piano student of Henryk van Zeyl. Van Zeyl had studied the piano with Franz Liszt. Buonamici graduated from the conservatory in 1894 after winning the conservatory's first prize in piano performance. He made his professional concert debut in Würzburg while a student in that city.

In 1895 Buonamici returned to Italy where he served his required year of compulsory military service in the Italian Army. After completing his military duties, he emigrated to the United States in 1896 and ultimately settled in Boston, becoming a prominent piano pedagogue there. In 1898 he co-founded the Fox-Buonamici School in Boston with the concert pianist Felix Fox. One of his pupils was the pianist Margaret Cravens who was known for her close friendship with the poet and critic Ezra Pound. Other students of note included the soprano and Juilliard School voice teacher Florence Kimball; concert pianist, Vassar College professor, and founder of Chicago's Lake Forrest School of Music Marta Milinowski; pianist and singer Erva Giles who had a career during the early years of American radio and made recordings for the Victor Talking Machine Company and Brunswick Records during the 1920s; composer and pianist Grace Cotton Marshall who published her music under the pseudonym G. Marshal-Loepke; and the concert pianist John Adams Warner; the latter of whom became a police officer after having a career as a concert pianist, ultimately serving as state superintendent of the New York State Police. In addition to teaching at his own piano school, Buonamici taught music at Miss Porter's School in Farmington, Connecticut.

Buonamici appeared onstage in Boston from ca. 1898 until his death in 1920. In addition to solo recitals, he performed with the Boston Symphony Orchestra on numerous occasions: Liszt Hungarian Fantasy (1902); Rachmaninoff Concerto no. 1 (1904, Boston premiere); Chopin Concerto no. 2 (1910). In addition to his work as a soloist, he was active as a chamber musician, often appearing with the Kneisel Quartet and Boston Symphony Quartet.

According to a memorial tribute written by Boston critic Philip Hale, Buonamici suffered from a "fear of a failing memory." Hale compared Buonamici to the French pianist Raoul Pugno, implying that Buonamici played from the score when performing in public. Hale described Buonamici's playing as being "characterized by fine phrasing, a polished style, brilliance and fire."

Buonamici joined the Italian Army during World War I, but eventually transferred to the Red Cross, serving as a sergeant in charge of 50 men and six ambulances. He was based in Florence, where he headed a distributing depot that supplied food and medicine to both soldiers and civilians.

Buonamici died suddenly while at work at Miss Porter's School in Farmington, Connecticut on 30 September 1920 at the age of 45.
