= James Yannatos =

American classical composer

James Yannatos (March 13, 1929 – October 19, 2011) was a composer, conductor, violinist and teacher. He was a senior lecturer at Harvard University until his retirement in 2009.

Yannatos was born and educated in New York City. In 1943, he was invited to attend Camp Rising Sun, a tuition-free, international summer camp in upstate New York. He attended the High School of Music and Art and the Manhattan School of Music. Subsequent studies with Nadia Boulanger, Luigi Dallapiccola, Darius Milhaud, Paul Hindemith, and Philip Bezanson in composition, William Steinberg and Leonard Bernstein in conducting, and Hugo Kortschak and Ivan Galamian on violin took Yannatos to Yale University (B.M., M.M.), the University of Iowa (Ph.D.), Aspen, Tanglewood, and Paris. As a young violinist, he performed at the Casals Festival and elsewhere in various professional ensembles, including a piano trio, a string quartet, and early music groups with Hindemith and Boulanger.

In 1964, he was appointed music director of the Harvard-Radcliffe Orchestra, and led that group on tours to Europe, Russia, South America, and Asia. He organized and co-directed the New England Composers Orchestra and the Tanglewood Young Artists Orchestra, and taught conducting at Tanglewood. He appeared as guest conductor-composer at the Aspen, Banff, Tanglewood, Chautauqua, and Saratoga Festivals, and with the Boston Pops, Winnipeg, Edmonton, Baltimore, and San Antonio Symphonies and the Sverdlovsk, Leningrad, Cleveland, and American Symphony Chamber Orchestras.

Yannatos composed music for both stage and television in addition to chamber music, choral works, and art songs. Many of his compositions are for children. His only opera, Rockets' Red Blare, to a libretto he wrote himself, premiered in 1971 in a student performance at Harvard University's Loeb Drama Center.

On October 1 and 2, 2011, a completely rewritten score to Rocket's Red Blare received its professional premiere by Intermezzo, The New England Chamber Opera Series at the Agassiz Theater in Radcliffe Yard, Cambridge, MA. In pre-performance talks, Yannatos revealed his dissatisfaction with virtually every element of the 1971 premiere, especially the stage direction, as well as his own music. After that production closed, he shelved the score until 2008, when he revised the libretto (mostly making cuts), and with the exception of a few vocal moments he liked, wrote an entirely new score. Intermezzo's production was directed by Kirsten Z. Cairns, with Edward Jones conducting the Juventas New Music Ensemble; designers William Fregosi (scenery), Rebecca Butler (costumes), and Winston Limauge (lights); and Singers David Kravitz (King), D'Anna Fortunato (Queen), Gregory Zavracky (Prince), Natalie Polito (The Girl), and Charles Blandy (Jester).

Yannatos died of cancer on October 19, 2011, not quite three weeks after having seen his only opera finally produced successfully.
