= Giuseppe Buonamici =

Italian composer

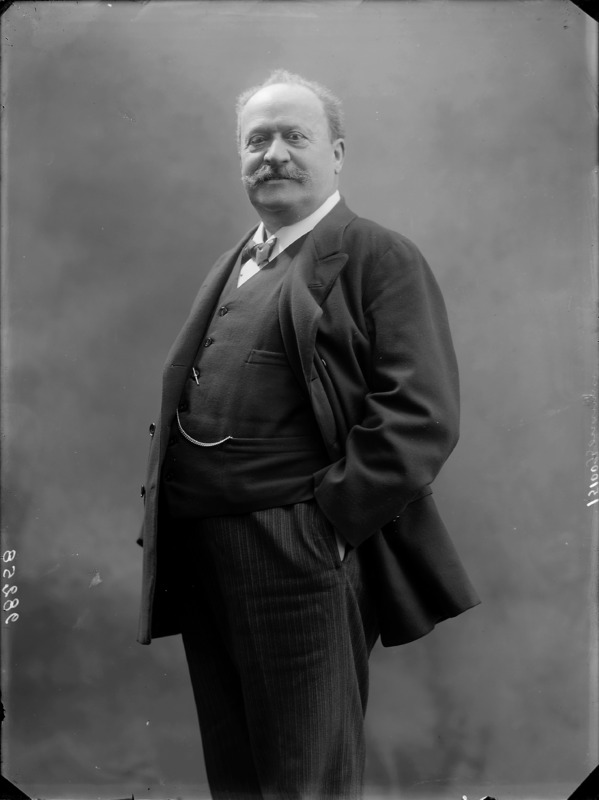
Giuseppe Buonamici photographed by Mario Nunes Vais

Giuseppe Buonamici (19 February 1846 – 18 March 1914) was an Italian composer, pianist and musicologist.

== Life ==
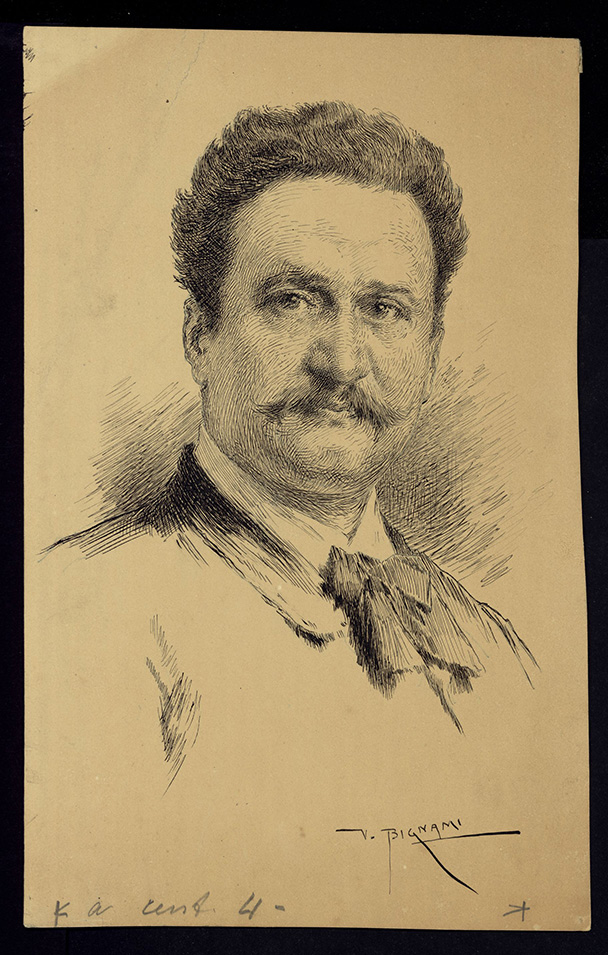
Giuseppe Buonamici. Portrait drawing by Vespasiano Bignami

Grandson of the opera singer Ferdinando Ceccherini, Buonamici was born in Florence. He started very early his musical studies, and already at the age of 14 was an appreciated pianist, known by the stage name "Niccolini". In 1868 he moved to Munich to study piano and counterpoint with Hans von Bülow and Josef Rheinberger, and began his activity as a composer during his stay in Germany.

In 1873 he returned to Florence, where he became director of the Cherubini Choral Society, founded the "Trio fiorentino" with Luigi Chiostri and Jefte Sbolci, and in 1893 he was appointed by royal decree professor of piano at the musical institute of the city. He continued to give occasional concerts in Italy, Germany and England, where he performed for the Queen Victoria and had the privilege of being appointed honorary member of the London Philharmonic Orchestra. In the last twenty years of his life, Buonamici devoted himself mainly to teaching and working as a researcher, reviewer and adaptor of music from the past, in particular as curator of the collection La Biblioteca del pianista published by the Casa Ricordi.

Buonamici emerged as an editor of piano compositions by Beethoven and Schubert. In addition to piano pieces, he composed a string quartet, an overture and songs. Buonamici died in Florence at the age of 68.

His son was the concert pianist and music educator Carlo Buonamici.
