= Federico Cortese =

Federico Cortese has served as music director of the Boston Youth Symphony Orchestras since 1999. He is also the music director of the New England String Ensemble and the conductor of the Harvard-Radcliffe Orchestra at Harvard University. In summer 2009, he was appointed principal conductor of the Boston University Tanglewood Institute.

Cortese has conducted throughout the United States, Australia, China, and Europe. From 1998 to 2002, Cortese served as assistant conductor of the Boston Symphony Orchestra under Seiji Ozawa. In addition to his annual scheduled concerts, Cortese led the Boston Symphony several times in Boston's Symphony Hall and at Tanglewood, most notably performing Beethoven's Symphony No. 9 and Puccini's Madama Butterfly. Mr. Cortese has conducted several prominent symphony orchestras, including Atlanta, Dallas, Houston, BBC Scottish Symphony, Sydney Symphony, and Oslo Philharmonic.

Opera engagements have included Maggio Musicale in Florence, the Spoleto Festival in Italy and in the United States, the Boston Lyric Opera, the Saint Louis Opera, the Finnish National Opera, Opera Australia, and the Washington Opera.

Cortese has been music coordinator and associate conductor of the Spoleto Festival in Italy. He also served as assistant conductor to Robert Spano, music director of the Brooklyn Philharmonic, and to Daniele Gatti, music director of the Orchestra dell'Accademia Nazionale di Santa Cecilia in Rome.

Cortese studied composition and conducting at the Conservatorio di Santa Cecilia in Rome and subsequently studied at the Hochschule für Musik in Vienna. Cortese also studied literature and humanities and holds a law degree from La Sapienza University in Rome.
