= Harvard–Radcliffe Orchestra =

The logo of the Pierian Sodality of 1808

The Harvard–Radcliffe Orchestra (HRO) is a collegiate symphony orchestra comprising Harvard students and based in Cambridge, Massachusetts, United States. Founded in March 1808 as the Pierian Sodality, the orchestra is considered by some the oldest symphony orchestra in the United States. Others dispute this because of the organization's somewhat informal beginnings (the original charter states that the intent of the Pierian Sodality is to "perform music for the enjoyment of others as well as serenade young women in the square"), and because at one point in its history, the Pierian Sodality was reduced to only one member, a flutist named Henry Gassett. As a result, some consider the New York Philharmonic the oldest American orchestra. The HRO assumed its current form as a modern symphony orchestra during the first half of the 20th century and was briefly the nation's largest collegiate orchestra.

The orchestra has over 100 members, and is the largest of Harvard's orchestras. In general, only Harvard College students are eligible for membership, though this rule is not absolute and has occasionally been waived when necessary, allowing students from the other Harvard schools to participate. The orchestra plays four concerts every year in Sanders Theatre on Harvard's campus. It also sometimes gives children's concerts and regularly participates in Harvard's annual Arts First festival. Its alumni board is still known as the Pierian Sodality of 1808.

From 1964 to 2009, the orchestra was led by James Yannatos, a composer and member of the music faculty. He retired after the 2008–09 school year, and Federico Cortese took over as music director on July 1, 2009.

The HRO has toured various places throughout its history, including Brazil, Washington, D.C., Canada, Italy, Soviet Union, Asia, Europe, Cuba, Mexico, and most recently South Korea. It has also performed in Carnegie Hall, and in 1978 placed third in the International Festival of Student Orchestras.

In 2025, HRO was suspended as a student organization by Harvard College for the fall semester, initially due to allegations of hazing, and subsequently for hosting unregistered social events and the provision of alcohol to minors. During this period, the HRO board was not allowed to meet or host events, and the orchestra was not allowed to use the Harvard–Radcliffe Orchestra name; its concerts continued, but were advertised under the banner of "Music 110," the catalogue number of the class in the Harvard Faculty of Arts and Sciences associated with the orchestra.
