= Georges Laurent =

French flautist (born 1886)

- Born: 7 June 1886; Paris
- Died: 22 September 1964 (aged 78); Vichy
- Occupation: Flautist

Georges Laurent (7 June 1886 – 22 September 1964) was a 20th-century French flautist.

== Biography ==
Georges Laurent, received his first education from his uncle, Louis Bas, oboist. He then studied privately with Philippe Gaubert in 1897, before entering the Conservatoire de Paris (1902) where he worked with Paul Taffanel and obtained the First Prize in 1905. He then integrated the Orchestre Colonne.

After the war, he was first flute in the Orchestre de la Société des Concerts du Conservatoire, with whom he toured the United States. He remained in Boston and was the first solo flute of the Boston Symphony Orchestra until 1952. He taught as soon as 1923 at the New England Conservatory of Music, where Claude Monteux and Robert Hugh Willoughby were among his pupils.

Bohuslav Martinů dedicated him his flute sonata H. 306 (1945) and Daniel Gregory Mason, his opus 13: 3 Pieces for flute, harp and string quartet (circa 1911–12, publ. 1923).
