= Boston Youth Symphony Orchestras =

The Boston Youth Symphony Orchestras (BYSO) is a youth orchestra based in Boston, Massachusetts under the artistic leadership of music director, Federico Cortese. Since 1958, BYSO has served thousands of young musicians from throughout New England with three full symphonic orchestras, two young string training orchestras, six chamber orchestras, a preparatory wind ensemble, a chamber music program and a nationally recognized instrument training program for underrepresented youth from inner-city communities called the Intensive Community Program (ICP). The 2017-2018 season marks the celebration of BYSO's 60th Anniversary. Each year, BYSO auditions approximately 850 students from throughout New England, ages 5–18, and accepts nearly 500 young musicians.

BYSO offers over 20 performances in some of Boston's venues including Boston Symphony Hall, Jordan Hall at the New England Conservatory, Sanders Theatre at Harvard University and the Tsai Performance Center at Boston University. The orchestras and chamber ensembles rehearse every Sunday from September through June at Boston University College of Fine Arts, where BYSO has been in residence since it was established in 1958. The College of Fine Arts is a major sponsor of BYSO.

BYSO receives funding from the National Endowment for the Arts, the premier federal arts funding agency in the United States, as well as numerous private and public funding sources. In 2007, the Massachusetts Cultural Council, the state's agency for arts, humanities and sciences, announced continued support for the BYSO; it ranked the BYSO first among all orchestras in the state for its quality, outreach programs, and fiscal and administrative management.

BYSO has the largest operating budget (in 2010, $2,372,974) of any youth orchestra in the United States, nearly double that of most youth orchestras.

Joe Grimaldi is the current president of BYSO board of directors.

== Orchestras ==
=== Boston Youth Symphony ===
The Boston Youth Symphony, BYSO’s premier ensemble, is composed of 115 advanced players. The group performs a wide range of demanding orchestral repertoire and is led by music director, Federico Cortese, and associate conductor, Adrian Slywotzky.

During the season, all members of BYS also participate in one of two chamber orchestras, BYS Sinfonietta or BYS Camerata, in which they explore music of the Classical period, including works by Haydn, Mozart, and Beethoven. BYS also annually performs full, semi-staged operas, which has been described as "almost unheard of" for a youth orchestra. By studying this repertoire in a chamber orchestra setting, BYS members develop specific techniques of ensemble playing and musical phrasing to a degree they may not otherwise experience within the larger orchestra. The BYS also holds an annual concerto competition open to all of its members.

BYS performs at venues including Boston Symphony Hall, Sanders Theatre at Harvard University, and Jordan Hall at New England Conservatory. BYSO has built an international presence with tours and performances in venues in Israel, Columbia, Japan, Germany, Belgium, Yugoslavia, Finland, Sweden, Italy, France, Estonia, Latvia, Russia, Spain, Portugal, Czech Republic, Great Britain, Ireland, Austria and Hungary.

Because of the COVID-19 pandemic, the BYSO conducted virtual rehearsals only for the 2020–2021 season, but returned to in-person ones for its annual residency in Maine in the summer of 2021 and its full season in Boston for the fall of 2021.

=== Repertory Orchestra (REP) ===
Under the direction of conductor Mark Miller, the Repertory Orchestra is an advanced, full symphonic orchestra composed of approximately 110 players. Repertory Orchestra has performed in some of Boston's venues including Boston Symphony Hall, Sanders Theatre at Harvard University, Jordan Hall at New England Conservatory and the Tsai Performance Center at Boston University.

During the season, all members participate in one of two chamber orchestras, Repertory Sinfonietta and Repertory Camerata, in which they explore music of the classical period, including great works by Haydn, Mozart and Beethoven. Mark Miller conducts Repertory Sinfonietta and John Holland conducts Repertory Camerata.

=== Junior Repertory Orchestra (JRO) ===
The Junior Repertory Orchestra, conducted by Yonah Zur, has grown steadily from a small string orchestra to a full symphonic ensemble made up of more than 108 members. Members receive group and individual coaching, which enables them to build solid, fundamental technical and musical skills. John Holland began his first season as the JRO conductor in 2012–2013. Under his leadership, JRO performs three times during the year at several venues throughout the Boston area, including Boston Symphony Hall, Boston University's Tsai Performance Center, Sanders Theatre at Harvard University, and at Arlington High School.

From the 2023–2024 season, the position of JRO conductor has been passed on to Yonah Zur, an accomplished violinist with an international performance career. He has had solo appearances with prominent Israeli ensembles and collaborations with Boston-based groups like A Far Cry and the Boston Chamber Music Society. Currently a teaching assistant at Harvard's Music Department and a long-time faculty member of the Boston Youth Symphony Orchestras, he has also taught at institutions like Juilliard and the Longy School.

=== Young People’s String Orchestra (YPSO) ===
The Young People's String Orchestra is conducted by Marta Zurad. YPSO has performed at such venues as Symphony Hall, Boston University's Tsai Performance Center, Kresge Auditorium at MIT, and has been featured as part of WCRB's Cartoon Festival.

=== Preparatory Winds (PW) ===
The Preparatory Winds, directed by Janet Underhill, beginning its first season in 2006–2007, is an ensemble of winds, brass, and percussion where students work on orchestral style music in preparation for BYSO’s full symphony orchestras.

=== Petit Ensemble (PE) ===
The Petit Ensemble is BYSO’s newest orchestra conducted by Marta Zurad, consisting of young string players, where they work on ensemble playing skills and musical interpretation.

=== Opera ===
BYSO's opera program began in 2008 with a semi-staged production of Mozart's Così fan tutte. Since then, BYS has continued to put on a semi-staged opera every year in collaboration with professional singers from around the world. Performances take place at Harvard University's Sanders Theatre under the baton of Music Director Federico Cortese.

Year	Opera	Composer
2008	Così fan tutte	Mozart
2009	Le nozze di Figaro	Mozart
2010	Don Giovanni	Mozart
2011	Macbeth	Verdi
2012	Falstaff	Verdi
2013	Rigoletto	Verdi
2014	Tosca	Puccini
2014	The Magic Flute (family opera)	Mozart
2015	Un Ballo in Maschera	Verdi
2016	Otello	Verdi
2016	Cinderella (family opera)	Rossini
2017	Eugene Onegin	Tchaikovsky
2018	Carmen	Bizet
2019	La Bohème	Puccini
2019	The Magic Flute (family opera)	Mozart
2020	Aida	Verdi
2022	La Traviata	Verdi
2023	The Damnation of Faust	Berlioz
2024	Norma	Bellini
2025	Don Carlo	Verdi
