= Felix Fox =

German-born concert pianist and educator

Felix Fox (born May 25, 1876, Breslau, Germany – d. March 24, 1947, Boston, Massachusetts) was a German-born concert pianist and educator.

Fox studied piano with Carl Reinecke in Leipzig, and Hungarian-French pianist Isidor Philipp in Paris, and studied music theory with Salomon Jadassohn. Fox graduated from the Royal Conservatory of Music in Leipzig where he made his debut in 1896. He made his Paris debut in 1897, his Boston debut in 1898, and his London debut in 1907. Fox performed concerts with the New York Symphony Orchestra, the Philadelphia Orchestra, the Detroit Symphony Orchestra, the Dannreuther String Quartet, as soloist with the Griller Quartet, violinist Albert Spalding, the Boston Festival Orchestra, the Boston Pops Orchestra, and the Boston Symphony Orchestra.

Fox moved to Boston, Massachusetts in 1897, and in 1898 co-founded the Fox-Buonamici School of Pianoforte Playing with pianist Carlo Buonamici in 1908 at 403 Marlborough Street in Boston's Back Bay. After Buonamici's death, in 1920, the school became the Felix Fox School of Pianoforte Playing. The school was closed in 1935. Among Fox's students were the composer Miriam Gideon and pianist and educator Harrison Potter. Potter went on to teach at the Fox-Buonamici School. Fox also taught piano at Phillips Academy in Andover, Massachusetts and the Framingham School for Girls, in Framingham, Massachusetts in the 1920s.

== Compositions ==
Fox composed a number of songs and works for solo piano and also made transcriptions of works by composer and pianist Edward MacDowell. In 1917, Fox published "The Boston Music Company Digest Of Piano Pieces: For The Left Hand Alone," reprinted by Kessinger Publishing, LLC, in 2010.

In 1932, Fox began work on the operetta, The King Fishers in collaboration with noted Broadway tenor and lyricist George Mitchell. The King Fishers was copyrighted in 1933 and received its premiere by Boston's Repertory Theatre in 1934.

In 1935, Fox was named a Chevalier in the Legion of Honour for his service to French Music.

Fox married Mary Vincent Pratt, a violist, in 1910; they had two children.
