= Easy Skanking in Boston '78 =

Live album by Bob Marley and the Wailers
- Released: 3 February 2015
- Recorded: 8 June 1978
- Venues: Boston Music Hall (Boston, Massachusetts)
- Genre: Reggae
- Length: 69:55
- Labels: Island Records; Tuff Gong

Bob Marley and the Wailers chronology
Legend: Remixed (2013)	Easy Skanking in Boston '78 (2015)	Exodus 40: The Movement Continues (2017)

Bob Marley and the Wailers video chronology
Live Forever: September 23, 1980 • Stanley Theatre • Pittsburgh, PA (2011)	Easy Skanking in Boston '78 (2015)

Easy Skanking in Boston '78 is the fifth live album by Jamaican reggae band Bob Marley and the Wailers. It was released on February 3, 2015, by Island Records and Tuff Gong. It was recorded at the Boston Music Hall (now The Wang Theatre) on June 8, 1978, as part of the band's Kaya Tour in support of their 10th studio album, Kaya.

Easy Skanking in Boston '78 was released in three separate editions – as a stand-alone CD, on DVD/Dd and Blu-ray. The albums was released by the Marley family on his 70th birthday to honour Marley and his work. It received mixed to positive reviews from music critics.

== Background ==
A year and a half prior to the recording, Bob Marley survived an assassination attempt in Jamaica, taking bullets to the chest and arm. Easy Skanking In Boston '78 was filmed at the Wang Theatre (Boston) in (Boston, Massachusetts). The video footage was shot with a hand-held camera by a fan that Marley allowed to sit right in front of the stage. During the filming of the band's live performance in the Wang Theatre, the cinematographer was forced to change rolls of film from time to time, leaving gaps in the recording of the performance. Animation video elements were produced and added to fill the gaps by S77 group (who have worked with the likes of Bruno Mars, Pearl Jam, Red Hot Chili, Disney and many more). The tour supported the band's debut solo album, Kaya (1978). Most of the songs on Easy Skanking In Boston ’78 originate from the album, but it also contains the band's past hits.

On February 17, 2015, this remastered unreleased concert was released by the Marley family on his 70th birthday. The DVD/Blu-Ray features video footage never seen of the Band and Marley.

== Reception ==
Professional ratings
Review scores
Source	Rating
AllMusic	4/5 stars
Irish Examiner	4/5 stars
Record Collector	3/5 stars
Rolling Stone (Germany)	3/4 stars
Uncut	7/10

David Jeffries of AllMusic stated: "Easy Skanking in Boston '78 marks the beginning of the Universal Music Group's archival Bob Marley series, something made possible by the Marley family, who offered up plenty of archival concert and unreleased studio recordings. This first release is a powerful show, slowly rolling up from midtempo favorites into some kicking and classic Wailers anthems like 'Jamming' and 'Exodus'. The sound quality is excellent and a vast improvement over bootlegs, which still sounded quite good, but it does seem an odd selection to launch the reggae legend's archival series, until one looks at the accompanying video release. Midnight Daver of World a Raggae wrote "This timeless live performance by the 'King of Reggae', and one of the best posthumous Marley albums to date from Island/Universal, is well worth the price of admission and proof positive that there will never be another Bob Marley."

== Track listing ==
CD
No.	Title	Writer(s)	Length
1.	"Slave Driver"	Bob Marley	4:13
2.	"Burnin' and Lootin"	Bob Marley	5:35
3.	"Them Belly Full"	Carlton Barrett, Lecon Cogil	3:37
4.	"The Heathen"	Bob Marley	4:20
5.	"Rebel Music (3 O'Clock Roadblock)"	Aston "Family Man" Barrett, Hugh Peart	5:35
6.	"I Shot the Sheriff"	Bob Marley	4:51
7.	"Easy Skanking"	Bob Marley	3:26
8.	"No Woman No Cry"	Vincent Ford	7:04
9.	"Lively Up Yourself"	Bob Marley	7:49
10.	"Jamming"	Bob Marley	9:42
11.	"War/No More Trouble"	Carlton Barrett, Allan Cole / Bob Marley	6:03
12.	"Get Up, Stand Up"	Bob Marley, Peter Tosh	5:54
13.	"Exodus"	Bob Marley	7:00
Total length:			69:55

DVD/Blu-Ray
No.	Title	Length
1.	"Rebel Music (3 O'Clock Roadblock)"	5:35
2.	"I Shot the Sheriff"	4:51
3.	"No Woman No Cry"	7:04
4.	"Lively Up Yourself"	7:49
5.	"Jamming"	9:42
6.	"War/No More Trouble"	6:03
7.	"Exodus"	7:00
Total length:		48:02

== Charts ==
Chart (1978)	Peak position
US Reggae Albums (Billboard)	1

== Personnel ==
Credits adapted from AllMusic.

- Bob Marley - vocals, guitar
- Junior Marvin – guitar, backing vocals
- Al Anderson - guitar
- Aston Barrett – bass
- Carlton Barrett – drums, percussion
- Earl Lindo – keyboards
- Tyrone Downie – keyboards, percussion, backing vocals
- Alvin Patterson – percussion
- Rita Marley – backing vocals
- Marcia Griffiths – backing vocals
- Judy Mowatt – backing vocals
