= Harrison Potter =

American concert pianist, accompanist, choral conductor and educator

Harrison Potter (May 9, 1891, North Adams, Massachusetts – October 3, 1984, Holyoke, Massachusetts) was an American concert pianist, accompanist, choral conductor, and educator.

Potter studied piano with Felix Fox, and, in Paris, Isidor Philipp. Early in his career, Potter taught for a time at Boston's Fox-Buonamici Piano School. He also served as assistant conductor of the 301st Army Regiment Band during World War I. He performed widely as a recitalist and accompanist during his career.

A Boston Globe review of a 1926 recital in Boston's Jordan Hall stated, "Mr. Potter’s excellence as a pianist is in his fine command of tonal gradations, his wide variety and subtlety of tonal color. He clearly loves his instrument and brings out its true powers admirably."

Potter's recording of Charles Tomlinson Griffes' Piano Sonata is referenced in the 1943 first edition of Edward Maisel's biography of Griffes, though due to its unavailability at the time of the second edition, other recordings were referenced instead.

From 1930 to 1948 Potter served as the Chautauqua Institution's assistant choral director and as choral director from 1948 to 1952. He also served as assistant conductor of the Ontario Society of New York from 1944 to 1948. From 1946 to 1957, Potter taught at Mount Holyoke College, the Felix Fox School of Pianoforte Playing in Boston, Massachusetts, the Chautauqua School of Music, and Sarah Lawrence College.

Potter accompanied many noted vocalists during his career including Metropolitan Opera singers Rose Bampton and Risë Stevens.

He died in Holyoke, Massachusetts in 1984.

== Recordings ==
- Harrison Potter, piano, "Five Sketches in Sepia," by Ernest Bloch, Friends of Recorded Music, FRM-12 (78 RPM), 1937
- Harrison Potter, piano, "Piano Sonata," by Charles Tomlinson Griffes, Friends of Recorded Music, FRM-10-11 (78 RPM), 1937
