= Jan Smeterlin =

Polish pianist

Jan Smeterlin (7 February 1892 in Bielsko, Austro-Hungarian Empire – 18 January 1967 in London) was a Polish concert pianist. He is especially known as an interpreter of Frédéric Chopin and Karol Szymanowski.

== Life ==
Jan Smeterlin was born as Hans Schmetterling. His father was Dr. Julius Schmetterling, a lawyer and board member of the Jewish Religious Community in Bielsko on behalf of the German assimilation party; his mother Amalia was also from the house also Schmetterling (they were first cousins). The Schmetterlings came to Bielsko from Grzymałów in Galicia. Under the name of Hans Schmetterling he gave concerts until 1923, when he appeared in the press as Jan Smeterling. From 1924, he used the name Jan Smeterlin.

Smeterlin performed his first concert at age seven, but despite exhibiting talent in his youth, he was forced to study law. He won a scholarship to study with pianist Leopold Godowsky while studying in Vienna. Godowsky was to be one of Smeterlin's most important teachers. Smeterlin made his professional debut in 1920.

Smeterlin was a cooking enthusiast and authored a posthumously published book of recipes. In her book Chocolate is Forever, Maida Heatter tells the story of how one of Smeterlin's recipes found a fan in the Queen Mother: "I originally got the recipe in 1962 from a food column by Clementine Paddleford in the New York Herald Tribune. Jan Smeterlin, the eminent pianist, picked up the recipe on a concert tour in Austria. When the Queen Mother was invited to tea at the home of some friends of the Smeterlins', the hostess baked the cake according to the Smeterlin's recipe. The Queen Mother loved it and asked for the recipe. Then–as the story goes–she served it often at her royal parties."

In his later years, Smeterlin and Didi, his wife, lived in New York City. Shortly after the couple returned to London in 1967, Smeterlin died.

== Szymanowski ==
Over the course of his career, Smeterlin maintained a close relationship with Polish composer Karol Szymanowski, whose works he frequently performed. The two were both colleagues and friends, and Szymanowski dedicated of a volume of mazurkas to Smeterlin and later published the pair's letters to each other.

== Recordings ==
Smeterlin recorded more music of Chopin than of any other composer. Over his career, Smeterlin recorded for the Philips, Mace, Allegro, Polydor, and RCA Victor recording labels.
