= Iva Kitchell =

American dancer

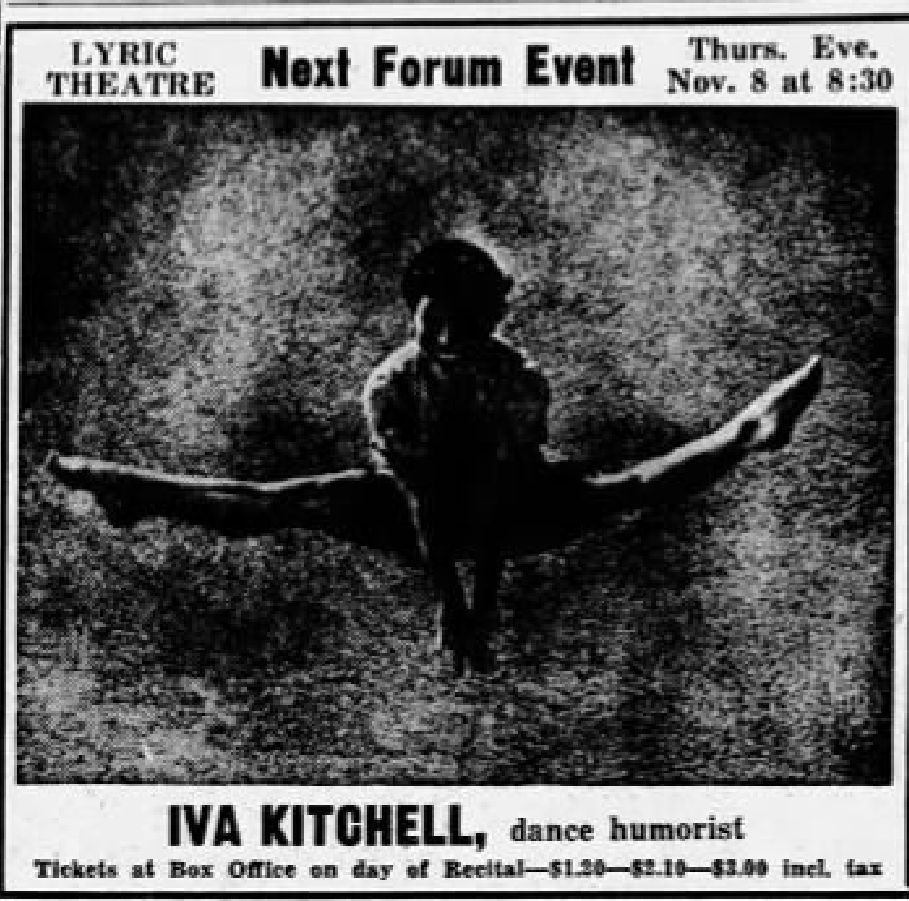
1945 newspaper advertisement for an Iva Kitchell show

Iva Kitchell (March 31, 1908 in Junction City, Kansas – November 19, 1983 in Daytona Beach, Florida) was a concert dancer, dance satirist and comedian.

== Biography ==
Born as Emma Baugh, Iva Kitchell was adopted by Robert W. Kitchells, at the age of three. Following years of difficult amateur activity, she found work in the ballet corps of the Chicago Civic Opera Ballet in 1922.

Kitchell was fond of amusing herself by mocking the seriousness of the performances, and was encouraged to develop her talent for comedic mimicry, rather than reprimanded. This was the beginning of her career performing comedic one-woman shows.

Kitchell eventually became a featured performer at Radio City Music Hall. She also worked with American Ballet Theatre and gave recitals at Jacob’s Pillow. She performed her one-woman shows extensively in the United States and Europe, including a series of notable recitals at New York’s Carnegie Hall and Carnegie Recital Hall in 1941, 1946, 1948 and 1949. She often billed herself as being assisted by the “Invisible Ballet Company." Kitchell frequently performed without a program, spontaneously selecting from among approximately 50 works, with titles such as, "Fantasy for Body and Piano," "Valse Triste, as shown on a home movie projector," "Bacchanale at the Opera," "Oriental Dance (by an Occidental Girl)," "Pseudo-Voodoo," and "Non-Objective." Ballet and ballerinas were frequent targets for her parody, as was modernist choreographer Martha Graham.

Her one-woman revue, That Girl at the Bijou, enjoyed a ten day run at New York's Bijou Theatre in 1956 with accompanist Harvey Brown. The New York Times said of her performance, "There is nothing at all in the nature of satire anywhere on the program, for satire requires at least a touch of malice and Ms. Kitchell is warm and affectionate toward everything she burlesques."

Kitchell told a Time magazine interviewer in 1946 "I just think there is something completely ridiculous about anything that is too serious."

Kitchell married painter and aeronautical engineer Stokely Webster in 1933. The couple adopted a daughter. After retiring from public performing in 1958, Kitchell ran a ballet studio in Huntington, Long Island, and later she and Webster relocated to Florida.
