= Boch Center =

Performing arts center in Boston, Massachusetts

The Boch Center
- The Wang
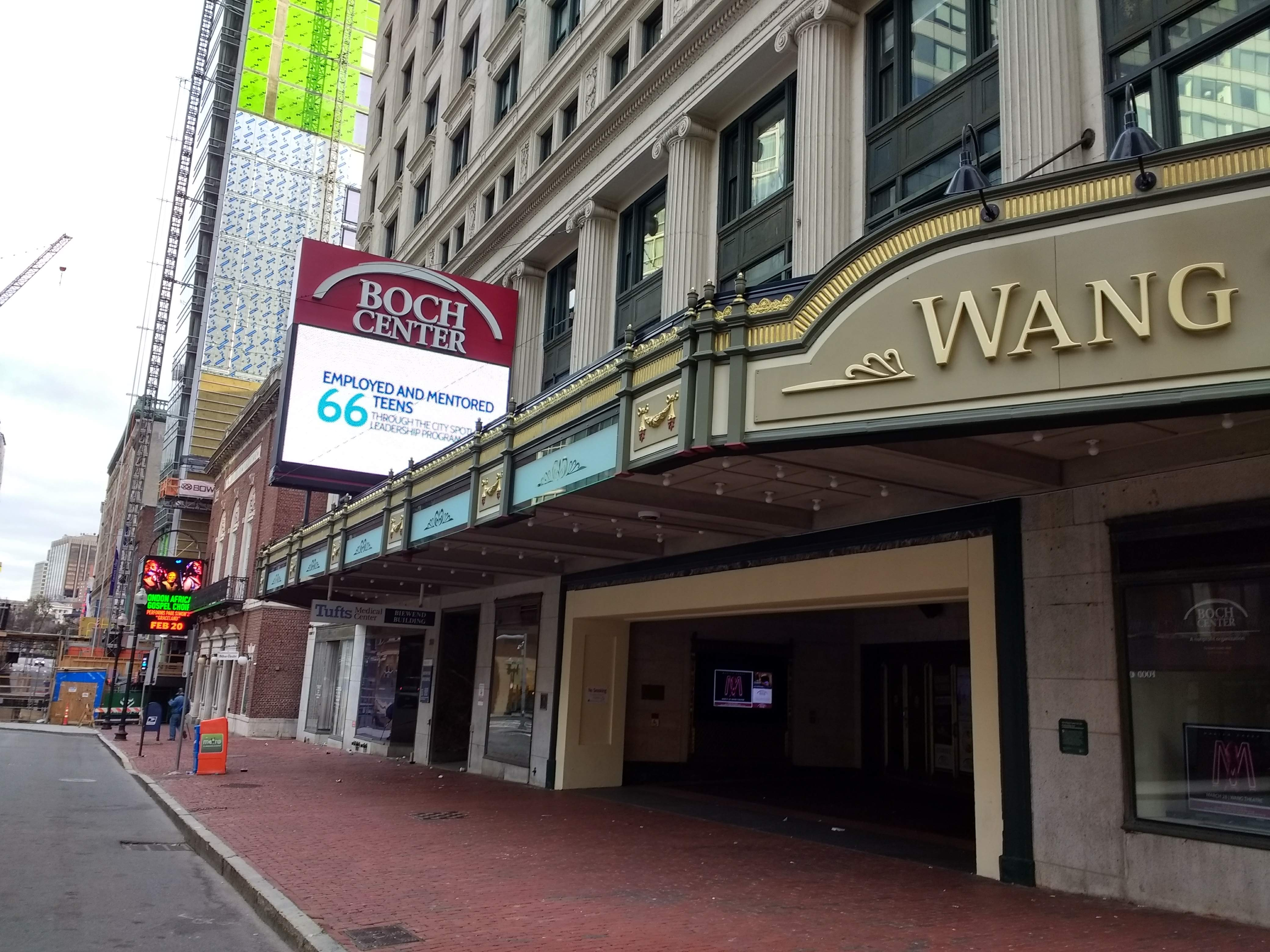
- The Boch Center Wang Theatre, 2018
- Address: 270 Tremont Street
- Location: Boston, Massachusetts, United States
- Capacity: 3,500

Construction
- Renovated: 1983

Website
- bochcenter.org

The Boch Center (formerly Citi Performing Arts Center and Wang Center for the Performing Arts) is a 501(c)(3) nonprofit performing arts organization located in Boston, Massachusetts. It manages the historic Wang and Shubert theatres on Tremont Street in the Boston Theater District, where it offers theatre, opera, classical and popular music, comedy, dance, and Broadway musicals. The center also offers educational workshops and community activities. It maintains partnerships with numerous arts organizations in Boston, including the Celebrity Series of Boston, Fiddlehead Theatre Company, Express Yourself, and more.

== History ==
When the Wang Theatre first opened in 1925, it was called the Metropolitan Theatre. After 30 years as the Metropolitan Theatre, the venue was called the Music Hall, then the Metropolitan Center. In 1983, An and Lorraine Wang donated the funds to renovate the theatre, and it became the Wang Center for the Performing Arts. The Wang Theatre is listed on the National Register of Historic Places, and with 3,600+ seats, it is one of the five largest stages in the country. The Wang Center began managing and operating the Shubert Theatre in 1996 when it entered a 40-year lease agreement with the venue. In 2006, the Wang Center became the Citi Performing Arts Center after establishing a 10-year partnership with Citigroup. In 2016, the Citi Performing Arts Center became the Boch Center following the announcement of a long-term partnership with the Boch family. In the past, it also managed the booking and preservation of the Emerson Colonial Theatre and the Strand Theatre.

== Programming ==
The Boch Center hosts a variety of performances and events at the Wang and Shubert Theatres, including theatre, dance, comedy, opera, classical and popular music concerts, and Broadway shows. The center maintains partnerships with other Boston arts nonprofits such as Fiddlehead Theatre Company, Handel and Haydn Society, A.R.T., Celebrity Series of Boston, Huntington Theatre Company, World Music, Dance Umbrellas, and Express Yourself.

The Wang and Shubert Theatres also host special events, such as corporate conferences, award ceremonies, galas, weddings, and more. They are also used as locations for movie filming. Movies filmed at the Wang Theatre include Ghostbusters (2016), American Hustle, The Pink Panther 2, The Witches of Eastwick, and The Great Debaters.

== Nonprofit Work ==
In 1988, the Education Department at the Boch Center was founded, and the following year the Walter Suskind Memorial Education Fund was established. The nonprofit arts education initiatives at the center include the City Spotlights Leadership Program, Teen Council, Target Arts, Interactive Readings Stories Alive, and Ticket Access. City Spotlights Leadership Program is a seven-week summer employment program for teens in the Boston area. In 2016, the program reached 61 students from 30 different high schools and 13 Boston and Everett neighborhoods. The program includes arts and leadership training, community advocacy, and performance. Teen Leadership Council brings together a smaller group of teens from greater Boston for year-round programming where teens create original performance pieces, facilitate workshops, advocate for social change, and volunteer in the community. Founded in 2009 in partnership with Boston Public Schools, the Target Arts Program is an artist residency program funded by Target Corporation. It provides an in-depth arts residency at four different Boston schools each year. The Interactive Reading: Stories Alive program provides interactive storytelling to children in various Boston neighborhoods. The center's Ticket Access program provides tickets to roughly 3,000 community organizations and schools in Greater Boston each year.

ArtWeek Boston is another nonprofit initiative produced by the Boch Center. This bi-annual, 10-day creative festival features more than 150 unique and creative experiences that are hands-on, interactive or offer behind-the-scenes access to artists or the creative process. It is presented by Highland Street Foundation.

== Theatres ==
- Wang Theatre
- Shubert Theatre

== See also ==
- An Wang
- The Shubert Organization
- List of concert halls
