= Performing arts presenters =

Performing arts presenting organizations facilitate exchanges between artists and audiences through creative, educational, and performance opportunities. The work that these artists perform is produced outside of the presenting organization.

Performing arts presenters are typically found in three varieties:

- Those attached to a college, university, or other educational institution, with performances usually taking place on campus;
- Those that are an administrative branch of a theater or concert hall, usually presenting performances only in that space;
- Those that are independently administered outside any specific venue, usually renting multiple venues for performances.

Many organizations also experiment with performances of a more conceptual nature or work across genres.

In the United States, most performing arts presenters are not-for-profit companies.

The Association of Performing Arts Professionals, (APAP) located in Washington, D.C., is the largest organizing body of performing arts presenters in the United States. The primary international organizing body of performing arts presenters is the International Society for the Performing Arts.

Performing arts presenters as a segment of the live performance market confronted particular difficulties during the COVID-19 pandemic. National Endowment for the Arts (NEA) chair, Maria Rosario Jackson was quoted in the Chicago Tribune as saying, "Few areas of the U.S. economy were hit harder than the performing arts, with the value added by performing arts presenters (including festivals) to Gross Domestic Product falling by nearly 73% between 2019 and 2020." A press release from the NEA added the following quote, "Performing arts presenters and performing arts companies joined oil drilling/exploration and air transportation as the steepest-declining areas of the U.S. economy in 2020."

== Performing arts presenters in the United States ==
- Cal Performances, Berkeley, California
- Philharmonic Society of Orange County (Irvine, California)
- San Francisco Performances, (San Francisco, California)
- Adrienne Arsht Center for the Performing Arts, (Miami, Florida)
- Clarice Smith Performing Arts Center, (College Park, Maryland)
- ArtsEmerson (Boston, Massachusetts)
- Celebrity Series of Boston (Boston, Massachusetts)
- Global Arts Live, Cambridge, Massachusetts
- Rockport Music (Rockport, Massachusetts)
- University Musical Society (Ann Arbor, Michigan)
- Whitefish Theatre Company (Whitefish, Montana)
- Hopkins Center for the Arts (Dartmouth College, Hanover, New Hampshire)
- The Music Hall, (Portsmouth, New Hampshire)
- Chamber Music Society of Lincoln Center, (New York, New York)
- Texas Performing Arts (The University of Texas at Austin, Austin, Texas)
- Performing Arts Houston (Houston, Texas)
- John F. Kennedy Center for the Performing Arts, Washington, D.C.
- Lied Center for Performing Arts
- Performing Arts Houston (Houston, Texas)

== See also ==
- Entertainment
- Performing arts
- Performing arts education
- Family entertainment center
