= Impresario =

Organizer and financier of concerts, plays, or operas

An impresario (from Italian impresa 'an enterprise or undertaking') is a person who organizes and often finances concerts, plays, or operas, performing a role in stage arts that is similar to that of a film or television producer.

== History ==
The term originated in the social and economic world of Italian opera, in which from the mid-18th century to the 1830s, the impresario was the key figure in the organization of a lyric season. The owners of the theatre, usually amateurs from the nobility, charged the impresario with hiring a composer (until the 1850s operas were expected to be new) and the orchestra, singers, costumes and sets, all while assuming considerable financial risk. In 1786 Wolfgang Amadeus Mozart satirized the stress and emotional mayhem in a single-act farce Der Schauspieldirektor (The Impresario). Antonio Vivaldi was unusual in acting as both impresario and composer; in 1714 he managed seasons at Teatro San Angelo in Venice, where his opera Orlando finto pazzo was followed by numerous others.

Alessandro Lanari (1787–1852), who began as the owner of a shop that produced costumes, eliminated the middleman in a series of successful seasons he produced for the Teatro della Pergola in Florence. He presented the premieres of the first version of Giuseppe Verdi's Macbeth, two of Vincenzo Bellini's operas and five of Gaetano Donizetti's, including Lucia di Lammermoor. Domenico Barbaia (1778–1841) began as a café waiter and made a fortune at La Scala, in Milan, where he was also in charge of the gambling operation and introduced roulette.

Duchess Elisabeth Sophie of Mecklenburg was a harpsichordist who also presided over seventeenth-century North German court music as an impresario.

== Modern use ==
The traditional term is still used in the entertainment industry to refer to a producer of concerts, tours and other events in music, opera, theatre, and even rodeo. Important modern impresarios in the traditional sense include Deryck Todd, Thomas Beecham, Rudolf Bing, Sergei Diaghilev, Richard D'Oyly Carte, Fortune Gallo, Sol Hurok, Sarah Caldwell, Andrew Lloyd Webber, Aaron Richmond, and jazz festival producer George Wein. Bill Graham, who produced music shows at The Fillmore Auditorium in San Francisco, was known as a rock music impresario.

== Application of term ==
The term is occasionally applied to others, such as independent art museum curators, event planners, and conference organizers who have a leading role in orchestrating events.

== Figurative impresarios ==
Jacques Cousteau said of himself that he was an impresario of scientists as an explorer and filmmaker who worked with scientists in underwater exploration. Nicholas Wade described James Watson and E. O. Wilson in The New York Times as impresarios of Charles Darwin's works.

== See also ==
- Media related to Impresarios at Wikimedia Commons
- Entrepreneur
