= List of Saint Louis University people =

The following is a list of Saint Louis University People, specifically notable alumni, notable faculty, and presidents of Saint Louis University.

== Notable alumni ==
=== Academia ===
- Robert Arp (Ph.D. 2004) – philosopher and author
- Richard Cusimano – historian and distinguished professor at the University of Louisiana at Lafayette
- Rebecca Ehretsman (Ph.D.) – eighteenth president of Wartburg College
- George Hardin Brown – medieval literature
- Jesse Grant Chapline – American educator and politician who founded distance learning college
- Michael J. Garanzini S.J. (B.A. 1971) – President of Loyola University Chicago from 2001 to 2015; president of SLU student government association from 1969 to 1970.
- Gary Gutting, American philosopher
- Patrick A. Heelan, S.J. (Ph.D. 1952) - philosopher of science
- Robert J. Henle, S.J. (B.A., M.A., PhL, STL) President of Georgetown University from 1969 to 1976
- Twinette Johnson (B.A. 1996, Ph.D. 2019) – dean of the David A. Clarke School of Law
- Joseph Koterski, S.J (M.A. 1980, Ph.D. 1982) – professor of philosophy and master of Queen's Court Residential College at Fordham University
- Francis Leo Lawrence (B.A. 1959) – President of Rutgers University from 1990 to 2002.
- William P. Leahy, S.J. (M.A. 1972, 1975) – President of Boston College since 1996.
- J. Bernard Machen (D.D.S. 1968) – President of the University of Florida from 2004 to 2014.
- Diana Natalicio – President of the University of Texas at El Paso
- Walter J. Ong, S.J. (M.A. 1941) – Cultural and religious historian, philosopher, and lecturer.
- Bernadette Gray-Little (Ph.D.) – Chancellor of the University of Kansas from 2009 to 2017.
- Joseph L. Badaracco – John Shad Professor of Business Ethics at Harvard Business School

=== Arts ===
- Thomas P. Barnett (1886) – Prominent architect and American impressionist painter.
- Charles Bosseron Chambers (1882-1964) – painter, and illustrator.
- Richard Dooling (B.A. 1976; J.D. 1987) – Lawyer and author of four novels: Critical Care; White Man's Grave; Brain Storm; Bet Your Life.
- Robert Guillaume (Attended) – Stage and television actor (Benson, Soap).
- James Gunn (B.A. 1992) – Film director ("Guardians of the Galaxy")(Slither), screenwriter (Dawn of the Dead, Scooby-Doo, Scooby-Doo 2: Monsters Unleashed), and novelist (The Toy Collector).
- Alex Hall (Attended) - Author (Ben Drowned).
- Andreas Katsulas (B.A.) – Actor, (The Fugitive, Babylon 5, Star Trek: The Next Generation).
- David Merrick (J.D. 1937) – Broadway producer.
- Dennis O'Neil (1939-2020) – Writer, Editor: Batman (comic book); Green Lantern/Green Arrow; The Question; Daredevil; Beware the Creeper.
- Albert Schweitzer – cartoonist for the St. Louis Post-Dispatch

=== Business ===
- Richard Chaifetz (B.S. 1975) – Founder, chairman, CEO of ComPsych Corporation; Founder, Chairman of Chaifetz Group; Naming donor of the Richard A. Chaifetz School of Business and Chaifetz Arena
- Michael Bidwill (B.S. 1987) – President, Arizona Cardinals
- August Busch IV (B.S.; M.B.A.) – Former president and CEO of the Anheuser-Busch Companies, Inc.
- Timothy J. Danis (B.S. 1969) - chairman and chief executive officer at Risk Consulting Partners
- Jim Kavanaugh (B.S.) – CEO and co-founder of World Wide Technology
- Mark Lamping (M.B.A.) – Former president of the St. Louis Cardinals
- Walden O'Dell (B.S.; M.S.) – CEO and chairman of Diebold, Inc. (1999-2005)
- Rex Sinquefield (B.A.) – Co-founder and co-chairman of Dimensional Fund Advisors; president of the Show-Me Institute

=== Politics ===
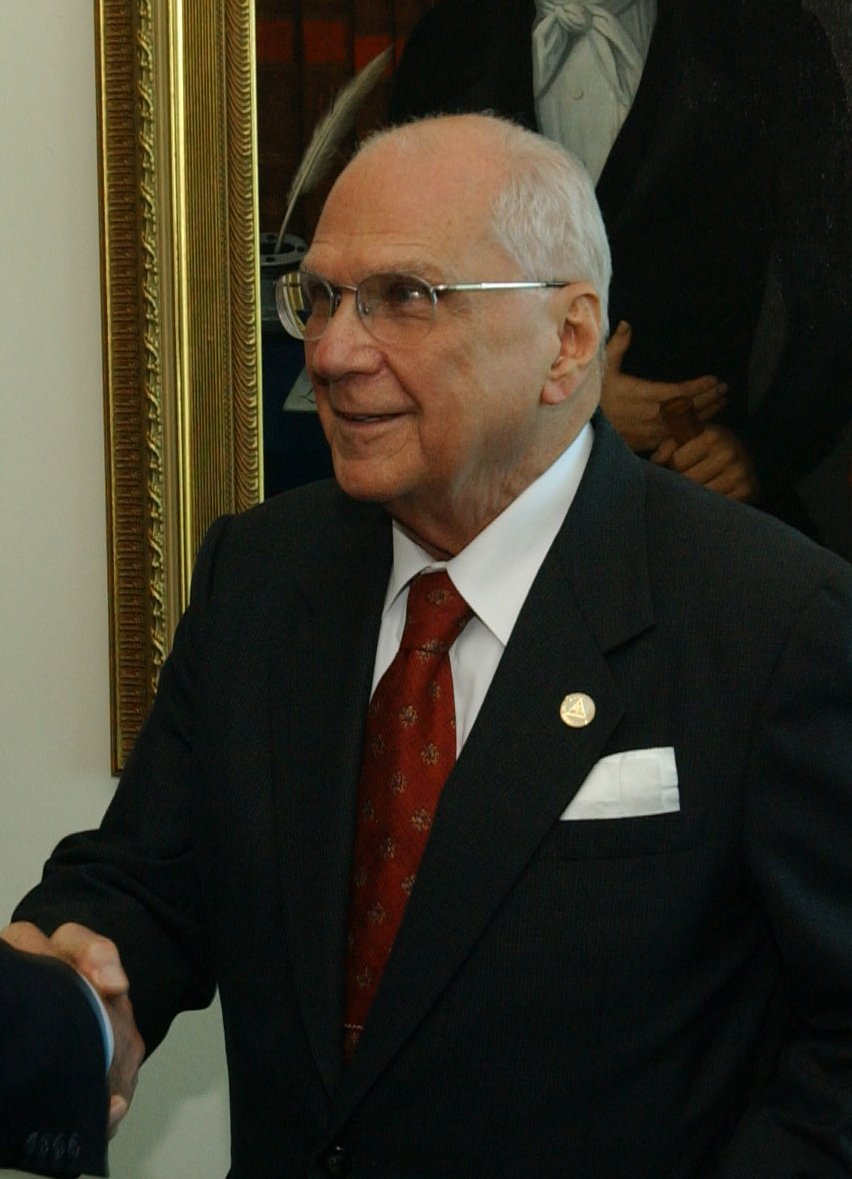
Enrique Bolaños, former President of the Republic of Nicaragua.

- Joyce Aboussie – Political strategist and National Political Director to Congressman Dick Gephardt
- Shepard Barclay (A.B. 1867), justice of the Supreme Court of Missouri
- David Barrett (M.S.W. 1956) – Premier of British Columbia, Canada (1972-1975)
- Dana J. Boente (1954– ), General Counsel of the FBI and former Acting Attorney General of the United States
- Enrique Bolaños (B.A. 1962) – former president of Nicaragua
- Freeman Bosley Jr. (B.A. 1976; J.D. 1979) – St. Louis, Missouri's first African-American mayor
- Jack W. Buechner (J.D. 1965) – U.S. Congressman, Missouri (1987-1991)
- Quico Canseco (B.A., J.D.) – U.S. Congressman, Texas (2011-2013)
- Alfonso J. Cervantes – Forty-third mayor of the City of St. Louis (1965-1973)
- Bill Clay (B.S. 1953) – U.S. Congressman, Missouri (1969-2001)
- James F. Conway (B.S., M.B.A.) – Forty-fifth mayor of the City of St. Louis (1977-1981)
- Joseph M. Darst – Forty-first mayor of the City of St. Louis (1949-1953)
- Jason Grill – Representative in the Missouri House of Representatives, (2006-2010)
- William R. Haine – Member of the Illinois Senate
- Robert Emmett Hannegan (1903–1949) (J.D. 1925) – Commissioner of U.S. Internal Revenue (1943-1945); chairman, Democratic National Committee (1944-1947); U.S. Postmaster General (Truman administration, 1945–1947); president, St, Louis Cardinals (1947–1949)
- Lester C. Hunt – Governor of Wyoming (1943-1949), U.S. Senator, Wyoming (1949-1954)
- Ed Martin (J.D. 1998, M.A.) – Acting U.S. Attorney for the District of Columbia
- Kevin F. O'Malley (A.B. 1970, J.D. in 1973) – United States Ambassador to Ireland (2014-2017)
- Mark Parkinson – Republican member of the Missouri House of Representatives
- Erika Polmar – businesswoman and activist
- William F. Quinn – First Governor of Hawaii (1959-1963)
- Richard J. Rabbitt (B.S. and L.l.b) – Speaker of Missouri House of Representatives
- Dale A. Righter - member of the Illinois State House of Representatives 1997-2003, Illinois State Senate 2003-2021
- David Safavian (B.A.) – Chief of Staff, General Services Administration (2002-2003)
- Eric Schmitt (J.D. 2000) – Attorney General of Missouri, United States Senate, Missouri (2023–present)
- Francis Slay (J.D. 1980) – Forty-ninth mayor of the City of St. Louis
- Steve Stenger – Democratic politician and former County Executive of St. Louis County
- James F. Strother – Virginia House of Delegate (1840-1851), Speaker of the Virginia House (1851), U.S. Congressman, Virginia (1851-1853)
- John B. Sullivan – U.S. Congressman, Missouri (1941-1943, 1945–1947, 1949–1951)
- Joseph P. Teasdale (J.D.) – Governor of Missouri (1977-1981)
- Harold L. Volkmer – U.S. Congressman, Missouri (1977-1997)
- Stephen Webber – Democratic member of the Missouri House of Representatives

=== Science and medicine ===
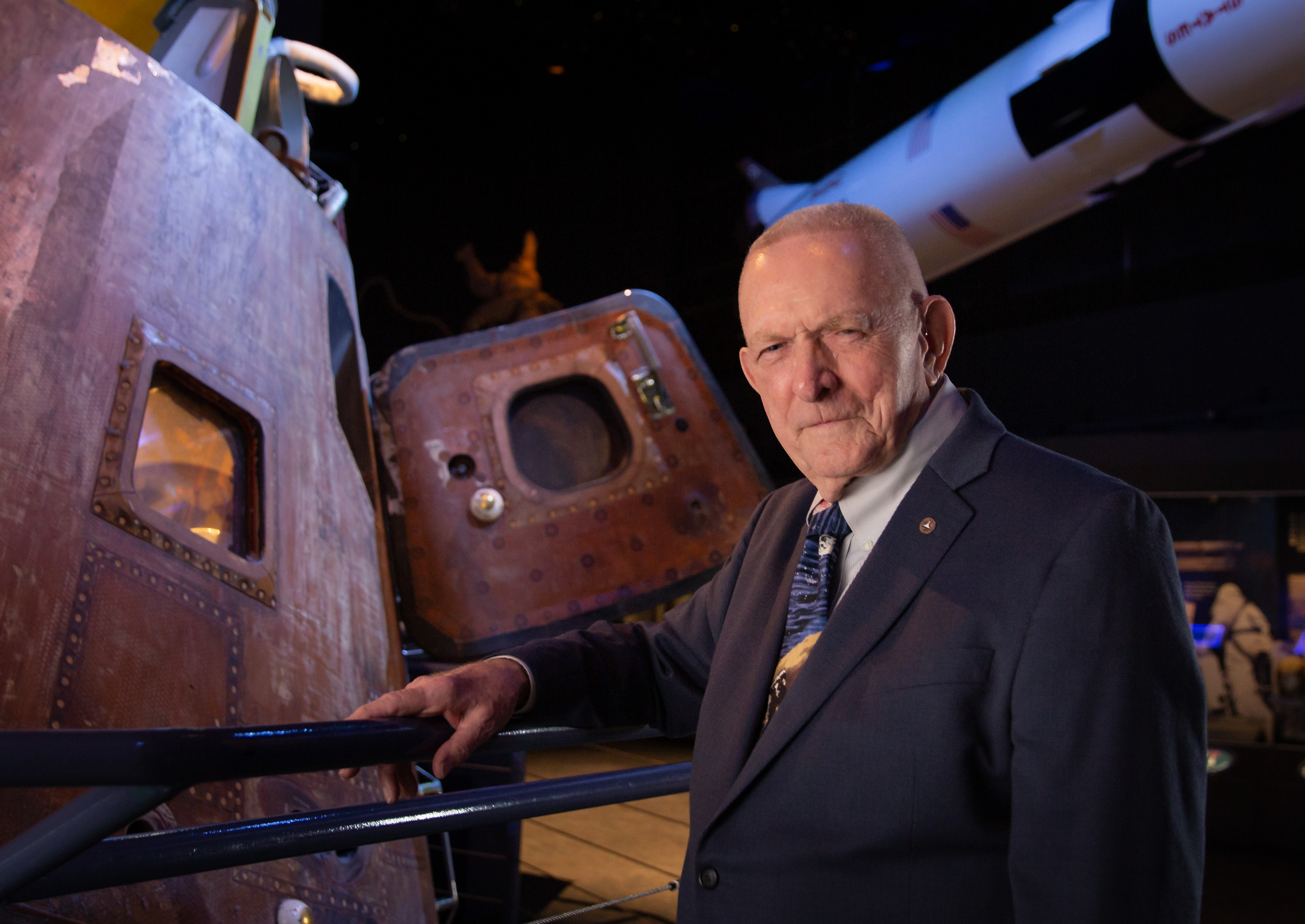
NASA Flight Director Gene Kranz

- Sridhar Condoor, Professor of Aerospace and Mechanical Engineering
- Joseph Dancis (M.D. 1938) – pediatrician known for his contributions to the fields of neonatology and placentology. 1988 recipient of the John Howland Award.
- Thomas Anthony Dooley (M.D. 1953) – Humanitarian, physician, and CIA operative who worked in Southeastern Asia; author of Deliver Us from Evil, The Edge of Tomorrow, and The Night They Burned the Mountain.
- Jan Garavaglia, MD – Star of Dr. G.: Medical Examiner.
- Gene Kranz (B.S. 1954) – Lead NASA flight director during the Apollo 11 Moon landing and leader of the Apollo 13 rescue mission.
- Nathan H. Lents (B.S., 1999; Ph.D., 2004) – Scientist and Author.
- Irene D. Long (M.D. 1977) – First female chief medical officer at Kennedy Space Center.
- Michelle Mainelli (B.S. 1992) – deputy director of the National Weather Service.
- Mary Euphrasia Markham, one of the first women to earn a nursing diploma at Georgetown University. She earned it in 1920, 43 years before the university officially admitted women.
- Richard G. Thomas (B.S. 1952) – (Aeronautical Engineering) Northrop test pilot – Tacit Blue; Secret Project/Area 51, F-5 Spin Tests, Edwards AFB, California.
- Jeff Geerling - American author, open-source software developer, and hardware reviewer best known for his YouTube channel.

=== Sports ===
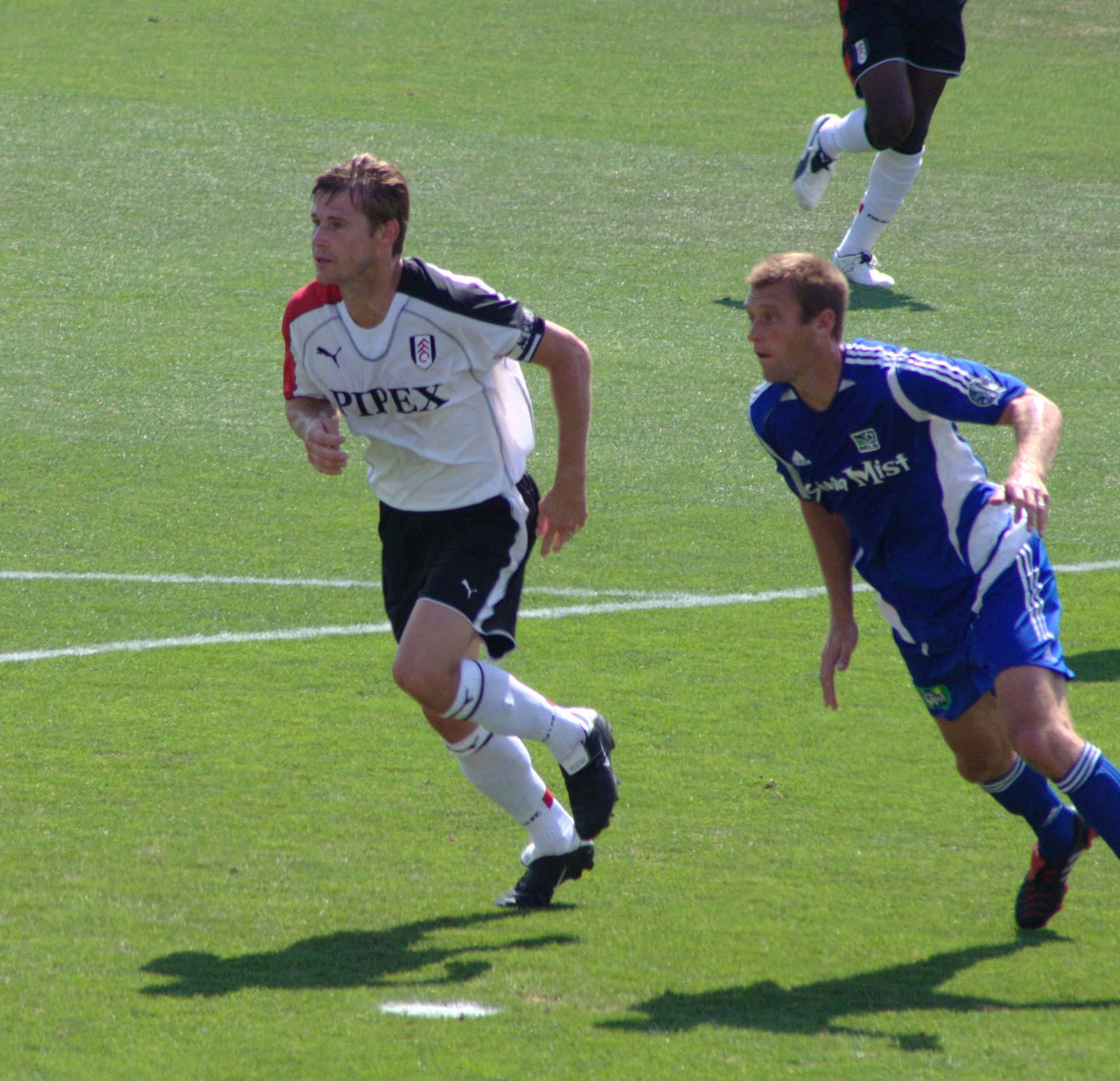
U.S. captain Brian McBride playing for Fulham F.C.

- Simon Becher - Forward for AC Horsens, currently on loan with St. Louis City SC
- Andy Benes – All-Star Major League Baseball right-handed pitcher. Played 14 years in Major League Baseball, from 1989 to 2002, and with four different teams: the San Diego Padres, the Seattle Mariners, the St. Louis Cardinals and the Arizona Diamondbacks. Benes joined SLU as a student after his professional baseball career ended.
- Anthony Bonner – SLU's all-time leading scorer in men's basketball and played six seasons in the NBA for the Sacramento Kings, New York Knicks and the Orlando Magic.
- Yuri Collins - basketball player for Ironi Ness Ziona of the Israeli Basketball Premier League
- Dick Boushka – Basketball All-American in 1954–55, Olympic gold medalist in 1956. Drafted by the Minneapolis Lakers.
- Brad Davis – attended but never graduated, was drafted after his sophomore year into the MLS by the MetroStars, played for Sporting Kansas City.
- Bob Ferry – Basketball All-American in 1958–59, enjoyed a ten-year career in the NBA with the St. Louis Hawks, Detroit Pistons, and Baltimore Bullets. Former assistant coach and general manager of the Baltimore Bullets; NBA Executive of the Year in 1979 and 1982.
- Larry Hughes – NBA basketball player, attended but never graduated, was drafted after his freshman year into the NBA by the Philadelphia 76ers.
- Jordan Goodwin - current NBA player
- Ty Keough – Amateur and professional soccer player and college coach; broadcaster with TNT, ESPN, and ABC
- John Klein - Former player for St. Louis City SC in the MLS, currently with Charleston Battery.
- Pat Leahy – Placekicker for the New York Jets from 1974 to 1990, played soccer at SLU
- Ed Macauley (1949) – NBA Hall of Famer
- Brian McBride – First American to score in more than one FIFA World Cup tournament, doing so once in 1998 and twice in 2002. He is also SLU's all-time leading goal-scorer and held the freshman scoring record until 2003, when he was surpassed by Vedad Ibišević.
- George Michael – Emmy-winning sportscaster, creator and host of The George Michael Sports Machine
- Tim Ream – Current defender for Charlotte FC and United States men's national soccer team
- Marcus Relphorde (born 1988) – basketball player in the Israeli National League
- Mike Shanahan – former owner of St. Louis Blues (1986-1995), soccer teams won national championships (1959, 1960)
- Jerry Trupiano – Former Boston Red Sox radio broadcaster
- Frank Vecera – Paralympic athlete, snooker and wheelchair basketball player
- H Waldman (born 1972) – American-Israeli basketball player; Israeli Basketball Premier League
- Dorsa Derakhshani (born 1998) – Iranian-American Women's Grandmaster and International Master in Chess. Won 3rd in 2020 US Women's Chess Championship

=== Miscellaneous ===
- Anton Anderledy – twenty-third Superior General of the Society of Jesus.
- Michael G. Brandt – Air National Guard Brigadier General.
- Marilyn Cade - activist and cofounder of ICANN
- Walter Halloran S.J. – assisted in notable exorcism that inspired The Exorcist (novel).
- Stephen Hanlon - American public defender reformer and civil rights attorney
- Jeremiah James Harty Archbishop of Manila and Omaha.
- John Kaiser – M.H.M. Mill Hill Missionary died under suspicious circumstances while serving in Kenya. Received an Award for Distinguished Service in the Promotion of Human Rights from the Law Society of Kenya prior to his death.
- Leo-Raymond de Neckere – Bishop of New Orleans (1830-1833).
- John T. Richardson – 9th President of DePaul University
- Bradbury Robinson – Threw the first legal forward pass in American football history for SLU in 1906. Captained SLU's baseball and track teams. Practiced surgery at the Mayo Clinic (1908–1910) and served on the staff of Surgeon General Hugh S. Cumming (1920–1926). Twice elected mayor of St. Louis, Michigan (1931 and 1937).
- Richard Stika – Third Bishop of the Diocese of Knoxville.
- John Stowe, O.F.M. Conv. – Bishop of the Diocese of Lexington in Kentucky
- Sister Rose Thering O.P. (Ph.D. 1961) – Dominican nun whose campaign against anti-Semitism in Catholic textbooks is the subject of the Oscar-nominated 39-minute documentary film directed by Oren Jacoby, Sister Rose's Passion.
- Bobby Wilks – First African American Coast Guard aviator, the first African American to reach the rank of captain in the Coast Guard and the first African American to command a Coast Guard air station.
- Edward Rice – Seventh Bishop of the Diocese of Springfield – Cape Girardeau.

== Notable faculty ==
=== Past ===
- Raymond J. Bishop – Priest involved in notable exorcism that inspired The Exorcist (novel).
- Vernon Bourke (1931-1975) – philosopher and author, considered an authority on Thomistic moral philosophy; first hockey coach of the university.
- Edward Adelbert Doisy, (November 3, 1893 - October 23, 1986) – biochemist, awarded the Nobel Prize in Physiology or Medicine in 1943 with Henrik Dam for their discovery of vitamin K and its chemical structure.
- Timothy Michael Cardinal Dolan, served as an adjunct professor of theology.
- Robert J. Henle, S.J. – professor of philosophy and leading figure in the revival of Thomistic philosophy. He was elected a member of the American Academy of Arts and Sciences. Prior to and following his appointment as president of Georgetown University (1969-1976), he served as a professor and lecturer in the College of Arts and Sciences, and Saint Louis University School of Law
- James B. Macelwane – pioneering seismologist
- Marshall McLuhan (1937-1944) – well known for coining the expressions "the medium is the message" and the "global village".
- Kurt Schuschnigg (1948-1967) – Chancellor of Austria from 1934 to 1938. An ally of Mussolini who continued the conservative, authoritarian and pro-Catholic dictatorship established by assassinated chancellor Engelbert Dollfuß (often referred to as “Austrofascism”), Schuschnigg is also known for advocating continued Austrian national sovereignty as opposed to annexation or Anschluss by the Third Reich and for suppression of political opposition within Austria, including the communists, social democrats and Nazis. He was pressured to resign by Hitler during his country's annexation by Germany and interned in Dachau concentration camp.
- Thomas Shippey – author and former faculty member of Oxford University, where he taught Old English. Widely considered one of the leading academic scholars of J. R. R. Tolkien.
- James Oliver Van de Velde – taught mathematics and rhetoric.

=== Present ===
- George W. Draper III – Chief Justice of the Missouri Supreme Court
- Clarence H. Miller – Emeritus Professor of English known for his contributions to the study of Renaissance literature, including his translations of St. Thomas More's Utopia and Erasmus's Praise of Folly.
- Thomas F. Madden – historian of Venice and the crusades; author of The New Concise History of the Crusades and Enrico Dandolo and the Rise of Venice
- Jerome Katz – Coleman Professor of Entrepreneurship; founder of the Billiken Angels Network.
- Eric Schmitt – U.S. Senator from Missouri
- Eleonore Stump – Robert J. Henle Professor of Philosophy; known for her work in Thomistic philosophy, study of the problem of evil, and contributions to the developing discipline of analytic theology.

== School presidents ==
=== Saint Louis College ===
- Francois Niel (1818–1824)
- Edmund Saulnier (1825–1827)
- Charles Felix Van Quickenborne, S.J. (1828–1829)
- Peter Verhaegen, S.J. (1829–1832)

=== Saint Louis University ===
- Peter Verhaegen, S.J. (1832–1836)
- John A. Elet, S.J. (1836–1840)
- James O. Van de Velde, S.J. (1840–1843)
- George A. Carrell, S.J. (1843–1847)
- John B. Druyts, S.J. (1847–1854)
- John S. Verdin, S.J. (1854–1859)
- Ferdinand Coosemans, S.J. (1859–1862)
- Thomas O’Neil, S.J. (1862–1868)
- Francis F. Stunteback, S.J. (1868–1871)
- Joseph G. Zealand, S.J. (1871–1874)
- Leopold Bushart, S.J. (1874–1877)
- Joseph E. Keller, S.J. (1877–1881)
- Rudolph J. Meyer, S.J. (1881–1885)
- Henry Moeller, S.J. (1885–1889)
- Edward J. Gleeson, S.J. (1889–1890)
- Joseph Grimmelsman, S.J. (1890–1898)
- James F. X. Hoeffer, S.J. (1898-1900)
- Williams Banks Rogers, S.J. (1900–1908)
- John Pierre Frieden, S.J. (1908–1911)
- Alexander J. Burrowes, S.J. (1911–1913)
- Bernard J. Otting, S.J. (1913–1920)
- William F. Robison, S.J. (1920–1924)
- Charles Cloud, S.J. (1924–1930)
- Robert S. Johnston, S.J. (1930–1936)
- Harry B. Crimmins, S.J. (1936–1942)
- Patrick J. Holloran, S.J. (1943–1948)
- Paul C. Reinert, S.J. (1949–1974)
- Daniel C. O’Connell, S.J. (1974–1978)
- Edward Drummond, S.J. (1978–1979)
- Thomas R. Fitzgerald, S.J. (1979–1987)
- Lawrence H. Biondi, S.J. (1987–2013)
- William R. Kauffman, J.D. (interim, 2013–2014)
- Fred P. Pestello, Ph.D. (2014–2025)
- Edward J. Feser, Ph.D. (2025–present)
