= General Brandt =

General Brandt may refer to:

- Heinz Brandt (1907–1944), German Wehrmacht officer posthumously promoted to major general
- Jürgen Brandt (1922–2003), German Bundeswehr general
- Karl Brandt (1904–1948), German Waffen-SS major general
- Michael G. Brandt (fl. 1970s–1990s), Missouri Air National Guard brigadier general

== See also ==
- Heinrich von Brandt (1789–1868), Prussian general
