= Audio deepfake =

Voice clips generated by AI

Deepfake audio clip simulating the voice of Donald Trump

Audio deepfake technology, also referred to as voice cloning or deepfake audio, is an application of artificial intelligence designed to generate speech that convincingly mimics specific individuals, often synthesizing phrases or sentences they have never spoken.

Initially developed with the intent to enhance various aspects of human life, it has practical applications such as generating audiobooks and assisting individuals who have lost their voices due to medical conditions. Additionally, it has commercial uses, including the creation of personalized digital assistants, natural-sounding text-to-speech systems, and advanced speech translation services. As with other forms of deepfakes, audio deepfakes have faced criticism for their use in scams, phishing, and misinformation campaigns.

== Categories ==
Audio deepfakes can be divided into three different categories:

=== Replay-based ===
Replay-based deepfakes are malicious works that aim to reproduce a recording of the interlocutor's voice.

There are two types: far-field detection and cut-and-paste detection. In far-field detection, a microphone recording of the victim is played as a test segment on a hands-free phone. On the other hand, cut-and-paste involves faking the requested sentence from a text-dependent system. Text-dependent speaker verification can be used to defend against replay-based attacks. A current technique that detects end-to-end replay attacks is the use of deep convolutional neural networks.

=== Synthetic-based ===
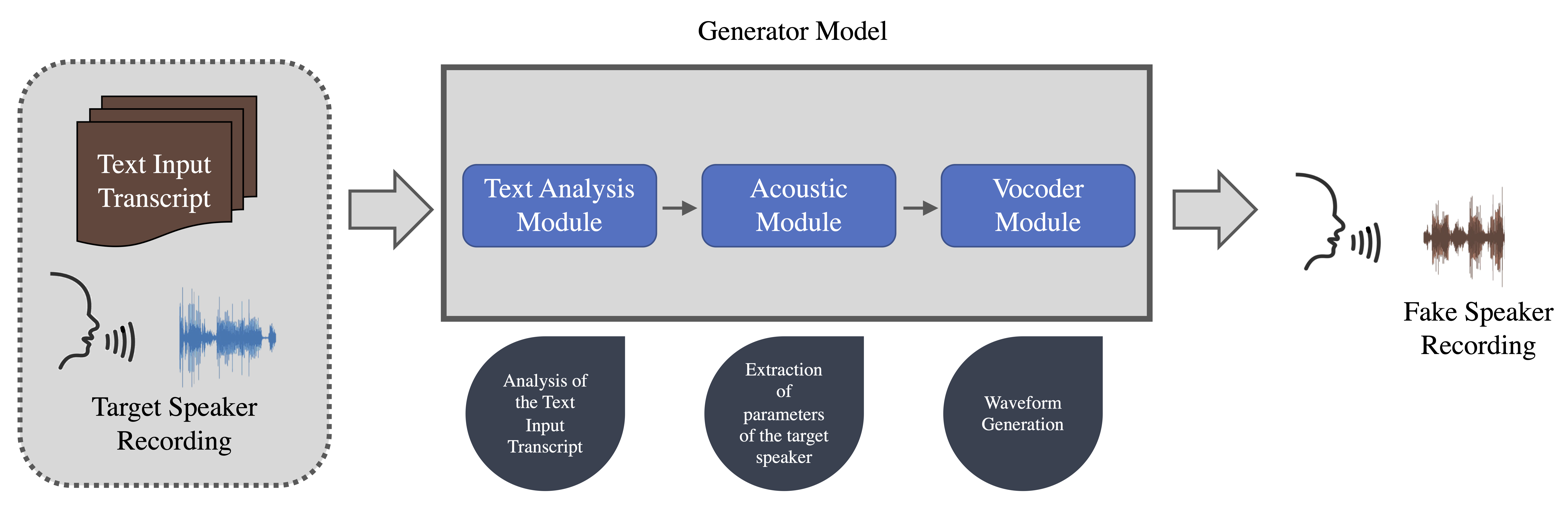
The synthetic-based approach diagram

The category based on speech synthesis refers to the artificial production of human speech, using software or hardware system programs. Speech synthesis includes text-to-speech, which aims to transform the text into acceptable and natural speech in real-time, making the speech sound in line with the text input, using the rules of linguistic description of the text.

A classical system of this type consists of three modules: a text analysis model, an acoustic model, and a vocoder. The generation usually has to follow two essential steps. It is necessary to collect clean and well-structured raw audio with the transcribed text of the original speech audio sentence. Second, the text-to-speech model must be trained using these data to build a synthetic audio generation model.

Specifically, the transcribed text with the target speaker's voice is the input of the generation model. The text analysis module processes the input text and converts it into linguistic features. Then, the acoustic module extracts the parameters of the target speaker from the audio data based on the linguistic features generated by the text analysis module. Finally, the vocoder learns to create vocal waveforms based on the parameters of the acoustic features. The final audio file is generated, including the synthetic simulation audio in a waveform format, creating speech audio in the voice of many speakers, even those not in training.

The first breakthrough in this regard was introduced by WaveNet, a neural network for generating raw audio waveforms capable of emulating the characteristics of many different speakers. This network has been overtaken over the years by other systems which synthesize highly realistic artificial voices within everyone's reach.

Text-to-speech is highly dependent on the quality of the voice corpus used to realize the system, and creating an entire voice corpus is expensive. Another disadvantage is that speech synthesis systems do not recognize periods or special characters. Also, ambiguity problems are persistent, as two words written in the same way can have different meanings.

=== Imitation-based ===
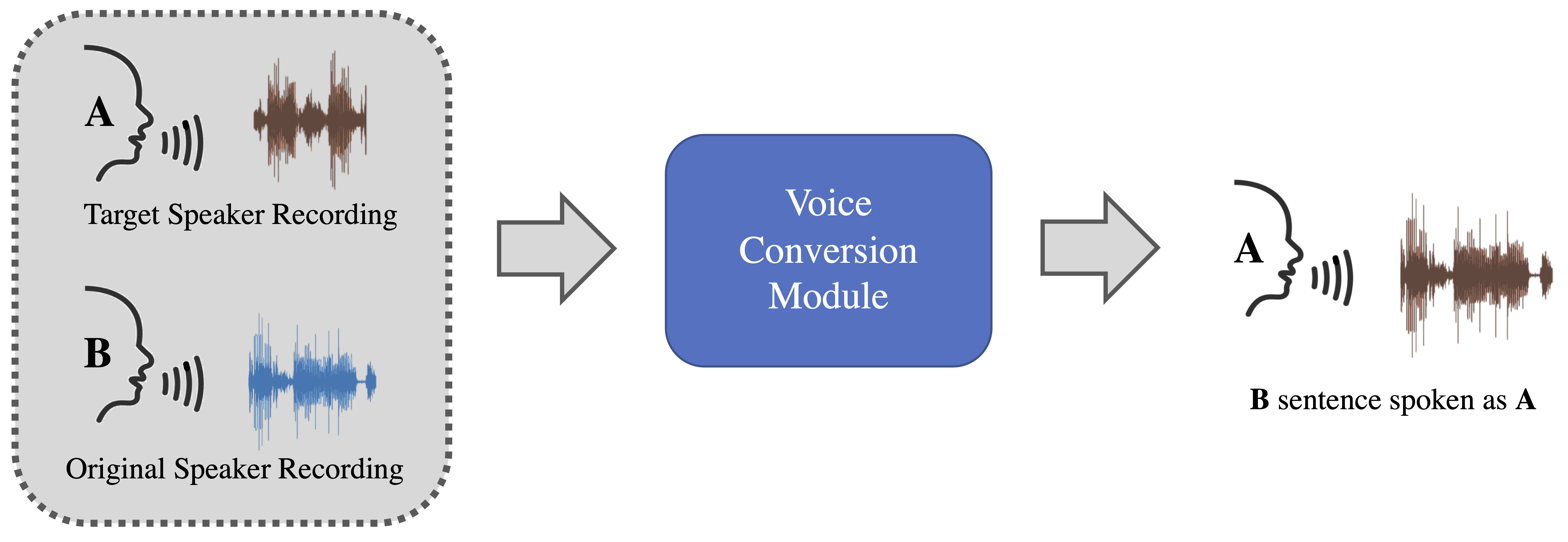
The Imitation-based approach diagram

Audio deepfake based on imitation is a way of transforming an original speech from one speaker - the original - so that it sounds spoken like another speaker - the target one. An imitation-based algorithm takes a spoken signal as input and alters it by changing its style, intonation, or prosody, trying to mimic the target voice without changing the linguistic information. This technique is also known as voice conversion.

This method is often confused with the previous synthetic-based method, as there is no clear separation between the two approaches regarding the generation process. Indeed, both methods modify acoustic-spectral and style characteristics of the speech audio signal, but the Imitation-based usually keeps the input and output text unaltered. This is obtained by changing how this sentence is spoken to match the target speaker's characteristics.

Voices can be imitated in several ways, such as using humans with similar voices that can mimic the original speaker. In recent years, the most popular approach involves the use of particular neural networks called generative adversarial networks (GAN) due to their flexibility as well as high-quality results.

Then, the original audio signal is transformed to say a speech in the target audio using an imitation generation method that generates a new speech, shown in the fake one.

== Detection methods ==
The audio deepfake detection task determines whether the given speech audio is real or fake.

Recently, this has become a hot topic in the forensic research community, trying to keep up with the rapid evolution of counterfeiting techniques.

In general, deepfake detection methods can be divided into two categories based on the aspect they leverage to perform the detection task. The first focuses on low-level aspects, looking for artifacts introduced by the generators at the sample level. The second, instead, focus on higher-level features representing more complex aspects as the semantic content of the speech audio recording.

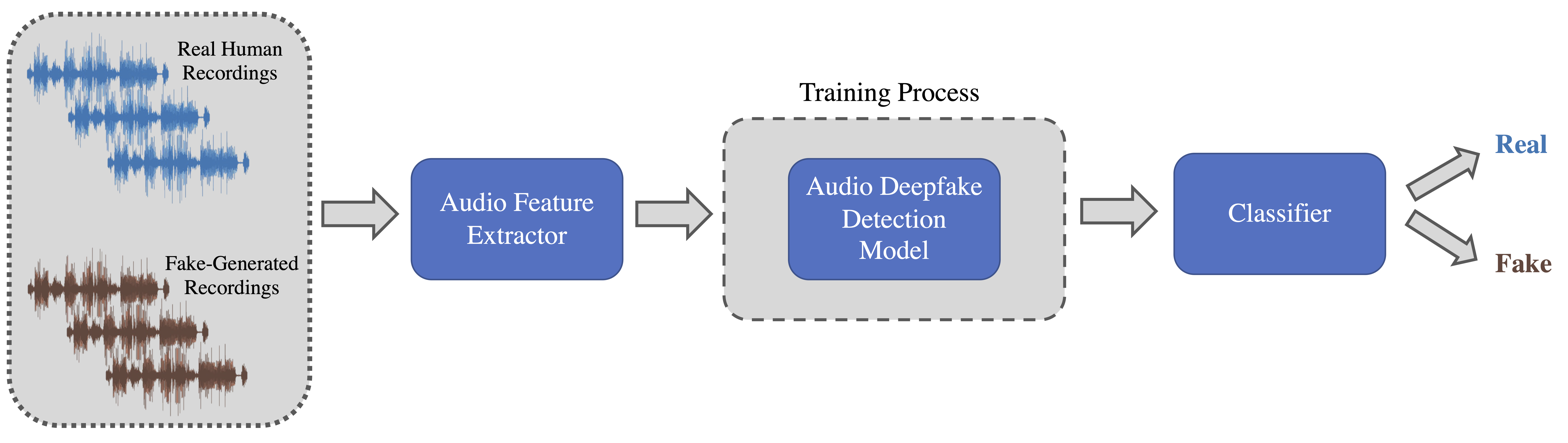
A generic audio deepfake detection framework

Many machine learning models have been developed using different strategies to detect fake audio. Most of the time, these algorithms follow a three-steps procedure:

1. Each speech audio recording must be preprocessed and transformed into appropriate audio features;
2. The computed features are fed into the detection model, which performs the necessary operations, such as the training process, essential to discriminate between real and fake speech audio;
3. The output is fed into the final module to produce a prediction probability of the Fake class or the Real one. Following the ASVspoof challenge nomenclature, the Fake audio is indicated with the term "Spoof," the Real instead is called "Bonafide."

Over the years, many researchers have shown that machine learning approaches are more accurate than deep learning methods, regardless of the features used. However, the scalability of machine learning methods is not confirmed due to excessive training and manual feature extraction, especially with many audio files. Instead, when deep learning algorithms are used, specific transformations are required on the audio files to ensure that the algorithms can handle them.

Most detection studies focus on English language deepfakes. Research on the most spoken languages like Chinese and Spanish remains limited. Hindi and Arabic are also understudied. Detection models trained primarily on English show reduced performance when tested on non-English audio. Accent variation also affects detection accuracy. Different pronunciations associated with specific regions or populations influence how well models identify synthetic speech.

There are several open-source implementations of different detection methods, and usually many research groups release them on a public hosting service like GitHub.

== Concerns and countermeasures ==
The increasing accessibility of audio deepfake technology has faced concerns over their use in scams and misinformation campaigns. People can use them as a logical access voice spoofing technique, where they can be used to manipulate public opinion for propaganda, defamation, or terrorism. Vast amounts of voice recordings are daily transmitted over the Internet, and spoofing detection is challenging. Audio deepfake attackers have targeted individuals and organizations, including politicians and governments.

In 2019, scammers using AI impersonated the voice of the CEO of a German energy company and directed the CEO of its UK subsidiary to transfer €220,000. In early 2020, the same technique impersonated a company director as part of an elaborate scheme that convinced a branch manager to transfer $35 million. In May 2024, the British engineering firm Arup confirmed that it had been the target of a deepfake scam in Hong Kong in which fake voices and images were used. According to Hong Kong police, a finance employee joined a video call with deepfake re-creations of the company's chief financial officer and other colleagues, and then transferred 200 million Hong Kong dollars (about US$25.6 million) to the fraudsters in 15 transactions.

According to a 2023 global McAfee survey, one person in ten reported having been targeted by an AI voice cloning scam; 77% of these targets reported losing money to the scam. Audio deepfakes could also pose a danger to voice ID systems currently used by financial institutions. In March 2023, the United States Federal Trade Commission issued a warning to consumers about the use of AI to fake the voice of a family member in distress asking for money.

In October 2023, during the start of the British Labour Party's conference in Liverpool, an audio deepfake of Labour leader Keir Starmer was released that falsely portrayed him verbally abusing his staffers and criticizing Liverpool. That same month, an audio deepfake of Slovak politician Michal Šimečka falsely claimed to capture him discussing ways to rig the upcoming election.

During the campaign for the 2024 New Hampshire Democratic presidential primary, over 20,000 voters received robocalls from an AI-impersonated President Joe Biden urging them not to vote. The New Hampshire attorney general said this violated state election laws, and alleged involvement by Life Corporation and Lingo Telecom. In February 2024, the United States Federal Communications Commission banned the use of AI to fake voices in robocalls. That same month, political consultant Steve Kramer admitted that he had commissioned the calls for $500. He said that he wanted to call attention to the need for rules governing the use of AI in political campaigns. In May, the FCC said that Kramer had violated federal law by spoofing the number of a local political figure, and proposed a fine of $6 million. Four New Hampshire counties indicted Kramer on felony counts of voter suppression, and impersonating a candidate, a misdemeanor.

In 2024, YouTuber Jeff Geerling received attention after noticing his voice was cloned without consent by the electronics manufacturer Elecrow, and the company subsequently apologized and removed the offending content. Geerling's experience was cited as a case meant to be addressed by YouTube's likeness-detection technology when it was released in 2025.

=== State-sponsored propaganda ===
In February 2023, research firm Graphika documented the first known case of state-aligned actors using AI-generated news anchors for political disinformation. The Chinese propaganda network Spamouflage created two fictitious news presenters named "Alex" and "Anna" using Synthesia AI software. The deepfake anchors appeared in videos posted to Facebook, Twitter, and YouTube starting in late 2022. Videos promoted pro-China narratives and criticized the United States. The operation cost approximately $30 per month for the AI software subscription. Detection indicators included robotic speech patterns, lip-sync errors, and grammatical mistakes in video subtitles.

== Open challenges and future research direction ==
The audio deepfake is a relatively new field of research. Consequently, there are numerous avenues for development and enhancement, as well as potential risks associated with the adoption of this technology.

A 2023 comprehensive survey on audio deepfake detection found that detection systems face significant challenges in generalizing across different generation methods and acoustic conditions.

=== Deepfake generation ===
Regarding the generation, the most significant aspect is the credibility of the victim, i.e., the perceptual quality of the audio deepfake.

Several metrics determine the level of accuracy of audio deepfake generation, and the most widely used is the mean opinion score (MOS), which is the arithmetic average of user ratings. Usually, the test to be rated involves perceptual evaluation of sentences made by different speech generation algorithms. This index showed that audio generated by algorithms trained on a single speaker has a higher MOS.

The sampling rate also plays an essential role in detecting and generating audio deepfakes. Currently, available datasets have a sampling rate of around 16 kHz, significantly reducing speech quality. An increase in the sampling rate could lead to higher quality generation.

In March 2020, a Massachusetts Institute of Technology researcher demonstrated data-efficient audio deepfake generation through 15.ai, a web application capable of generating high-quality speech using only 15 seconds of training data, compared to previous systems that required tens of hours. The system implemented a unified multi-speaker model that enabled simultaneous training of multiple voices through speaker embeddings, allowing the model to learn shared patterns across different voices even when individual voices lacked examples of certain emotional contexts. The platform integrated sentiment analysis through DeepMoji for emotional expression and supported precise pronunciation control via ARPABET phonetic transcriptions. The 15-second data efficiency benchmark was later corroborated by OpenAI in 2024.

=== Deepfake detection ===
Focusing on the detection part, one principal weakness affecting recent models is the adopted language.

Most studies focus on detecting audio deepfake in the English language, not paying much attention to the most spoken languages like Chinese and Spanish, as well as Hindi and Arabic.

It is also essential to consider more factors related to different accents that represent the way of pronunciation strictly associated with a particular individual, location, or nation. In other fields of audio, such as speaker recognition, the accent has been found to influence the performance significantly, so it is expected that this feature could affect the models' performance even in this detection task.

In addition, the excessive preprocessing of the audio data has led to a very high and often unsustainable computational cost. For this reason, many researchers have suggested following a self-supervised learning approach, dealing with unlabeled data to work effectively in detection tasks and improving the model's scalability, and, at the same time, decreasing the computational cost.

Training and testing models with real audio data is still an underdeveloped area. Indeed, using audio with real-world background noises can increase the robustness of the fake audio detection models.

In addition, most of the effort is focused on detecting synthetic-based audio deepfakes, and few studies are analyzing imitation-based due to their intrinsic difficulty in the generation process.

=== Defense against deepfakes ===
Over the years, there has been an increase in techniques aimed at defending against malicious actions that audio deepfake could bring, such as identity theft and manipulation of speeches by the nation's governors.

To prevent deepfakes, some suggest using blockchain and other distributed ledger technologies (DLT) to identify the provenance of data and track information.

Extracting and comparing affective cues corresponding to perceived emotions from digital content has also been proposed to combat deepfakes.

Another critical aspect concerns the mitigation of this problem. It has been suggested that it would be better to keep some proprietary detection tools only for those who need them, such as fact-checkers for journalists. That way, those who create the generation models, perhaps for nefarious purposes, would not know precisely what features facilitate the detection of a deepfake, discouraging possible attackers.

To improve the detection instead, researchers are trying to generalize the process, looking for preprocessing techniques that improve performance and testing different loss functions used for training.

In January 2023, China implemented regulations requiring deepfake content to be clearly labeled. The rules prohibit using deep synthesis technology to produce or disseminate fake news. Service providers must verify user identities and maintain content logs. The regulations represent one of the first comprehensive government frameworks specifically targeting deepfake technology.

=== Research programs ===
Numerous research groups worldwide are working to recognize media manipulations; i.e., audio deepfakes but also image and video deepfake. These projects are usually supported by public or private funding and are in close contact with universities and research institutions.

For this purpose, the Defense Advanced Research Projects Agency (DARPA) runs the Semantic Forensics (SemaFor). Leveraging some of the research from the Media Forensics (MediFor) program, also from DARPA, these semantic detection algorithms will have to determine whether a media object has been generated or manipulated, to automate the analysis of media provenance and uncover the intent behind the falsification of various content.

Another research program is the Preserving Media Trustworthiness in the Artificial Intelligence Era (PREMIER) program, funded by the Italian Ministry of Education, University and Research (MIUR) and run by five Italian universities. PREMIER will pursue novel hybrid approaches to obtain forensic detectors that are more interpretable and secure.

DEEP-VOICE is a publicly available dataset intended for research purposes to develop systems to detect when speech has been generated with neural networks through a process called Retrieval-based Voice Conversion (RVC). Preliminary research showed numerous statistically significant differences between features found in human speech and that which had been generated by Artificial Intelligence algorithms.

=== Public challenges ===
In the last few years, numerous challenges have been organized to push this field of audio deepfake research even further.

The most famous world challenge is the ASVspoof, the Automatic Speaker Verification Spoofing and Countermeasures Challenge. This challenge is a bi-annual community-led initiative that aims to promote the consideration of spoofing and the development of countermeasures.

Another recent challenge is the ADD—Audio Deepfake Detection—which considers fake situations in a more real-life scenario.

Also the Voice Conversion Challenge is a bi-annual challenge, created with the need to compare different voice conversion systems and approaches using the same voice data.

==== Extended use without permission ====
On 22 May 2025, it was claimed that Hoya Corporations product ReadSpeak used recording work done by the actress Gayanne Potter for them in 2021 which at the time she understood would just be used for accessibility and e-learning software, but is now available generally as the voice Iona and is used as the announcer on ScotRail trains. This replaced older messages recorded by Fletcher Mathers without her permission. On 25 August 2025, ScotRail announced that they will replace the AI voice on trains, however it's not confirmed if this will be a human recording or another AI-trained voice.

In September 2026, the Tokyo District Court ruled that the unauthorized commercial use of an AI-generated imitation of a person's voice can infringe publicity rights. It is the first judicial recognition of a right to one's voice in Japan. Voice actor Kenjiro Tsuda brought the case against TikTok over an AI clone of his voice used in more than 180 TikTok videos.

== See also ==
- 15.ai
- Artificial intelligence
- Artificial intelligence and elections
- Deepfake
- Deep learning
- Digital cloning
- Digital signal processing
- Speech analysis
- Speech recognition
- Speech synthesis
- Voice changer
