= Lawrence Biondi =

20th and 21st-century American Jesuit priest and university president

The Reverend Lawrence H. Biondi of the Society of Jesus
- President Emeritus, Saint Louis University
- Installed: August 1987
- Term ended: September 2013
- Predecessor: Thomas R. Fitzgerald, S.J. (1979-87)
- Successor: Bill Kauffman, J.D. (interim, 2013-14)

Orders
- Ordination: June 11, 1970
- Rank: Priest

Personal details
- Born: December 15, 1938 (age 87) Chicago, Illinois
- Denomination: Roman Catholic
- Parents: Hugo and Albertina Biondi

Lawrence H. Biondi, SJ is a Catholic Priest who served as the President of Saint Louis University from 1987 to 2013, a period that saw significant changes to campus and the university as a whole.

== Early life and education ==
Born in Chicago, Illinois, Biondi studied at St. Ignatius College Preparatory School where he first became interested in the Society of Jesus. Biondi joined the Jesuit order's Chicago province in 1957. Biondi taught French and Latin at St. Xavier High School in Cincinnati, Ohio, from 1965 to 1967. He was ordained a priest in 1970.

Biondi earned six degrees. His master's degree in linguistics (A Comparative Study of Tagmemic and Stratificational Grammars, 1966) and his doctorate in sociolinguistics (The Linguistic Development and Socialization of Italian-American Children in Boston’s North End, 1975) both were conferred by Georgetown University. He earned three degrees from Loyola University Chicago and a licentiate in sacred theology from the Jesuit School of Theology at Chicago.

== President of Saint Louis University ==
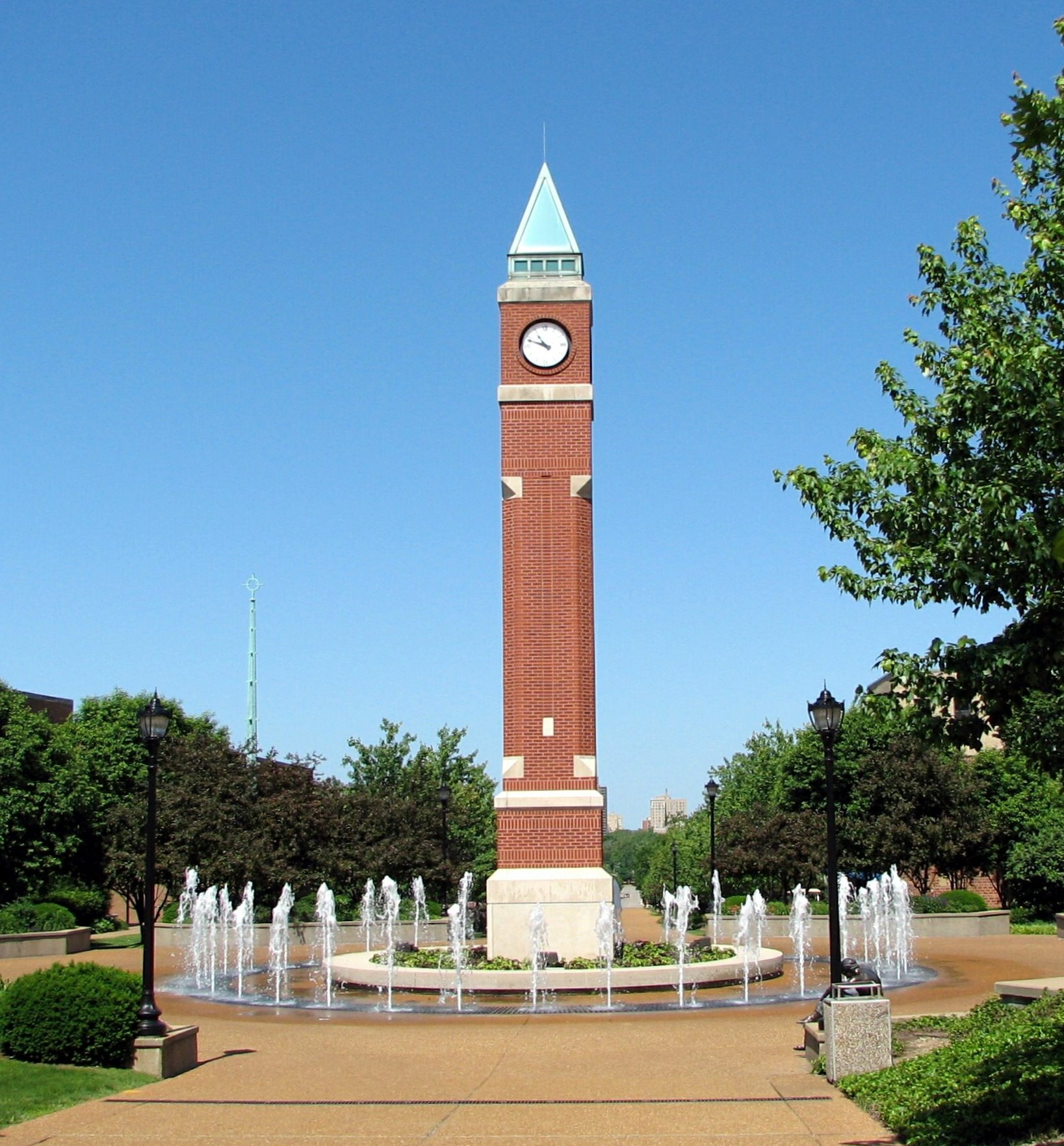

In August 1987, Biondi was chosen to succeed Thomas R. Fitzgerald, S.J. (1979-87) and be installed as the 31st President of Saint Louis University (SLU).

The timeline of Biondi's quarter-century of leadership at SLU shows the following major initiatives. In 1991 SLU opened Missouri's first school of public health, known as Saint Louis University College for Public Health and Social Justice. In 1993 West Pine Boulevard that cuts across campus was replaced by a spacious walkway and Clocktower Plaza. Two museums were opened on campus, one of religious art in 1993 and in 2002 the SLU Museum of Art that also includes memorabilia of Jesuit history from Florissant to the Great Plains. In 1999 the Paul C. Reinert, S.J., Center for Transformative Teaching and Learning opened. In 2007 the $82 million Edward A. Doisy Research Center opened, with 80 research labs on 10 floors. It would grow to include a Center for World Health and Medicine, given to the research of medicines to treat diseases that predominantly affect the world's poor and underserved. The following year saw the completion of the $80.5 million Chaifetz Arena seating 10,600 and bringing SLU basketball games back to campus. The old practice gym would become a Cross-Cultural Center welcoming people of all backgrounds, cultures, and identities. In 2013 the law school moved closer to the law courts downtown, with the acquisition of a large facility that housed also the Law Library and legal clinics. In line with training men and women for others and global citizens, new initiatives included: in 1998 Make a Difference Day involving the entire university community at over 100 sites around town; in 2001 the Campus Kitchen Project for the needy; and in 2010 the Center for Sustainability, with masters and a doctoral program on urban and global development.

== Leadership style ==
Biondi was a controversial figure for his approach to leadership for accomplishing his bold vision, once describing himself as a "my-way-or-the-highway kind of guy."

Centering on issues about shared governance with regard to an increase in parking fees, SLU's Student Government Association passed a motion of no confidence in Biondi on March 30, 1999. Student or faculty governance bodies at SLU considered but did not finally act upon no-confidence measures in Biondi in 2002, 2004, 2009, and 2010. In a 2012 interview Biondi said, "My vision of my legacy is for SLU to be the finest Catholic university in the United States."

In October, 2012, the Faculty Council of the College of Arts and Science and then the University's Faculty Senate voted no confidence in Fr. Biondi. The primary reason for the votes of no confidence against Biondi was his continued support for Vice President-Academic Affairs Manoj Patankar and Patankar's controversial and widely unsupported proposed policies regarding faculty evaluations. As the no confidence movement against Biondi grew, faculty voiced other grievances, including Biondi's disregard for shared governance, the University's declining academic rankings, low alumni giving, and "a pervasive culture of fear." SLU's Student Government Association voted no-confidence in Biondi.

The votes came after turmoil on campus early in the 2012-2013 academic year, first with the abrupt resignation of the dean of the school of law and then with the release of proposed policy changes in faculty evaluations by Vice President for Academic Affairs Manoj Patankar. In August 2012, the School of Law Dean Dr. Annette Clark resigned in protest over Biondi's transfer of more than $800,000 from law school funds to The President's Opportunity Fund and over disputes with Biondi and Patankar about funding of law professors' academic research. Biondi and Patankar said that they had intended to fire Clark before her resignation. On the heels of Clark's resignation, campus dissension erupted with the release of Vice President Patankar's proposed policies on faculty evaluations which attempted to apply uniform metrics in evaluating faculty with diverse areas of expertise and weakened the status of tenure at Saint Louis University. The controversy over the proposed policies prompted a vote of no confidence by the Faculty Senate against Patankar—a vote upon which Biondi refused to act.

On May 3, 2013, at a gala attended by some 800 persons celebrating his 25 years as university president, Biondi announced his intention to retire as president, and did so the following September.

== Publications ==
=== Books ===
- Biondi, Lawrence. The Italian-American Child: His Sociolinguistic Acculturation. Washington, D.C.: Georgetown University Press, 1975.
- Biondi, Lawrence. Poland's Church-State Relations, ed. Chicago: Loyola University of Chicago Press, 1981.
- Biondi, Lawrence. Spain's Church-Relations, co-ed. Chicago: Loyola University of Chicago Press, 1983.
- Biondi, Lawrence. Poland’s Solidarity Movement, co-ed. Chicago: Loyola University of Chicago Press, 1984.
