= Billiken Angels Network =

Billiken Angels Network (BAN) was an organization of angel investors based in St. Louis, Missouri, that provided equity capital for growing companies, from seed stage to later stages of growth, in any industry, including high technology, medical and biotechnology, IT, apps, and consumer products. BAN invested between $50,000 and $500,000 in its initial investments, and could invest more in follow-on rounds. BAN primarily invests in firms that are based within a 100-mile radius of St. Louis. The only exceptions made were for firms whose owners have a current or prior student, faculty or staff relationship to Saint Louis University.

BAN was a university-based angel network, founded in 2008 by Prof. Jerome Katz of the Entrepreneurship Program at Saint Louis University's John Cook School of Business. The university provided a sidecar fund that co-invested with BAN's angel members for initial and follow-on investments. A portion of BAN's member dues helped support the Entrepreneurship Program's educational and co-curricular efforts, and BAN members were obligated to help the Program out at least twice a year. Given its university mission, BAN offered free public workshops to the St. Louis community on funding startups and pitching to angels.

BAN's angels were accredited investors. But one unique aspect of BAN's membership was the group of Billiken Angel Fellows. These Fellows were volunteers from a variety of professions (medicine, law, engineering, finance, retailing, marketing, IT, etc.) who support the angels through assisting in the screening process and performing due diligence on behalf of the angels. In its heyday, BAN was rated as one of the most active angel investing groups in the Midwest by the Angel Resource Institute with the third highest deal flow among Midwestern Venture organizations.

BAN was a member of the Angel Capital Association, the professional trade group of American angel investor organizations.

Companies in which BAN has invested include Aisle411, BusyEvent, and EndoStim, greetabl and Helper Helper.

BAN went into harvest mode in early 2018, no long making new investments. BAN members continued to invest and work with the companies in which they invested. In 2024, a research article reviewing the structure, performance and accomplishments of BAN, "Cultures of Evaluation: Leveraging Academia for Due Diligence in Angel Investments" was published in N. Blacksmith & M. E. McCusker (Eds.). Data-driven decision making in the entrepreneurial ecosystem: Novel analytic techniques to understand and enhance business performance(Taylor & Francis).
