= Fred Pestello =

American sociologist and administrator in higher education

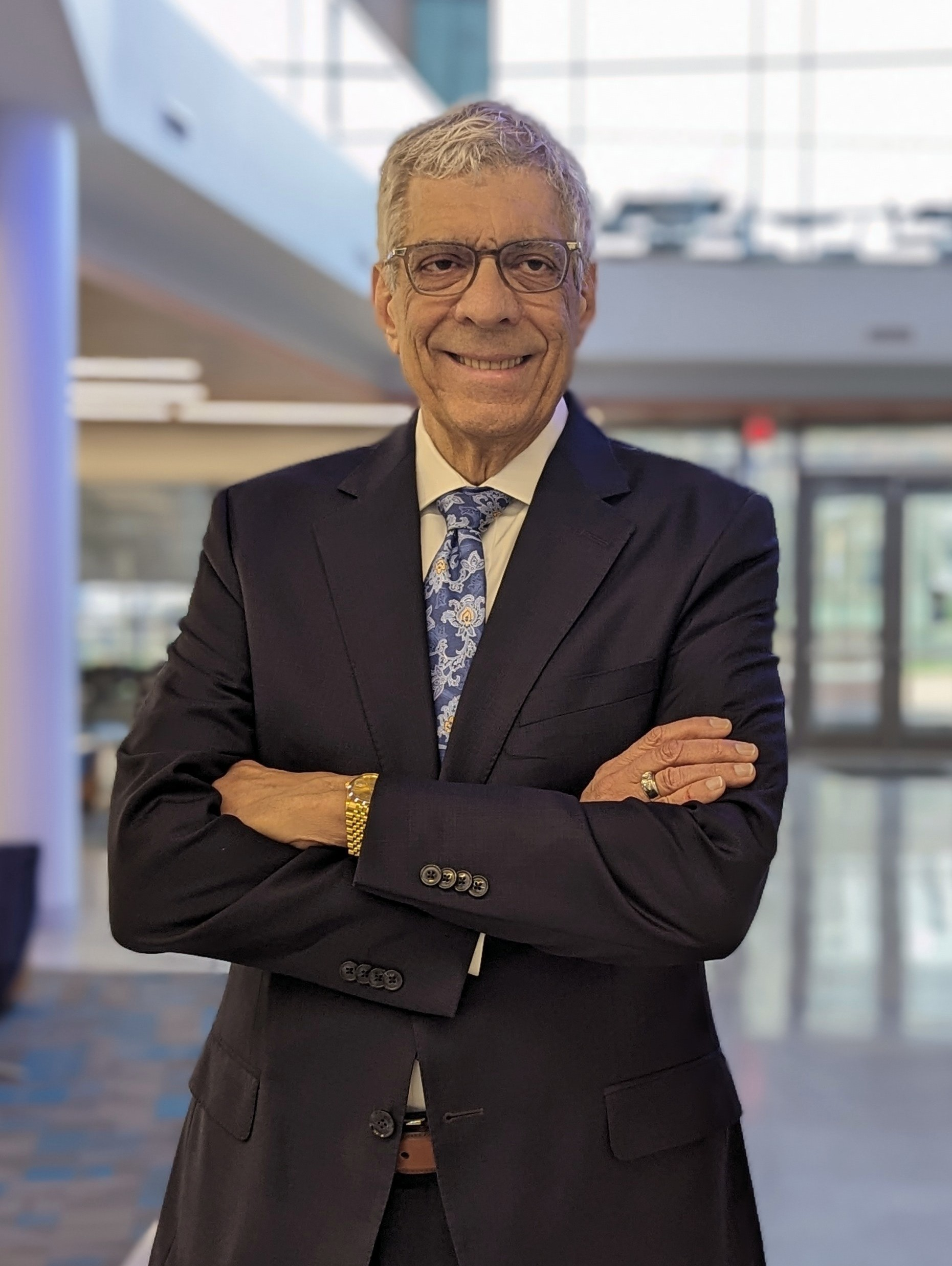

President of Saint Louis University
- In office July 1, 2014 – June 30, 2025
- Preceded by: Lawrence Biondi
- Succeeded by: Edward Feser

Personal details
- Born: June 10, 1952 (age 74) Cleveland, Ohio, U.S.
- Spouse: Frances Pestello
- Education: John Carroll University (BA); University of Akron (MA, PhD)

Fred P. Pestello (born June 10, 1952) is an American sociologist and educator who served as the 33rd president of Saint Louis University in Missouri from 2014 to 2025. He previously served as president of Le Moyne College from 2008 to 2014.

== Biography ==
Pestello was born and raised in Cleveland, Ohio, and received his bachelor's degree in sociology from John Carroll University in 1974, his master's degree in sociology from the University of Akron in 1981, and his doctoral degree from the University of Akron-Kent State University joint Ph.D. program in sociology in 1985.

=== University of Dayton ===
Pestello served at the University of Dayton for 24 years. He began his academic career as professor of sociology at the university, and later became chair of the department of sociology, anthropology, and social work. From there, Pestello took administrative positions as the associate dean of the College of Arts and Sciences. Later, he served as the University of Dayton's Provost and Senior Vice president for Educational Affairs from 2001 to 2008.

Pestello also served the Ohio Partnership for Continued Learning, the Dayton Regional Network, United Way of Greater Dayton, and St. Joseph Children's Treatment Center. From 2003 to 2005, he served on the National Advisory Council Fostering Student Development through Faculty Development, a project funded by the Lilly Endowment, Inc. and the John Templeton Foundation.

=== Le Moyne College ===
Pestello was the first permanent lay leader of Le Moyne College, a Jesuit institution of higher education and the only comprehensive Catholic college in Central New York. As president, Dr. Pestello oversaw stewardship of a record donation to the college: a $50 million bequest from the McDevitt family. He also directed physical improvements on the campus, including renovation of an abandoned building in order to house a bookstore open to the community, and construction of the Coyne Science Center. Pestello implemented changes that increased enrollment, and led two fund-raising campaigns. In September 2008, Pestello initiated a strategic visioning process entitled "OneLeMoyne," culminating in a new strategic plan. In June 2009, Pestello met with the Superior General of the Society of Jesus in Rome, Italy.

=== Saint Louis University ===
Pestello was appointed to serve as president of Saint Louis University by the university's board of trustees on 20 March 2014. On 21 March 2014, Pestello was officially named the 33rd president of Saint Louis University. He replaced Lawrence Biondi.

Since Pestello took office in 2014, SLU has invested in further construction around campus and negotiated an agreement with SSM Health which includes a $550 million investment on the medical campus. After peacefully resolving a weeklong campus encampment known as "OccupySLU" that took place in the wake of the shooting of Michael Brown, Pestello's administration oversaw the implementation of the Clocktower Accords, an agreement made between Pestello and OccupySLU protesters to promote racial equity at SLU.

Pestello also led the Accelerating Excellence fundraising campaign, which launched in November 2018. By its conclusion in 2022, the effort raised $604 million to support the university. On March 21, 2024, Pestello announced that he would be stepping down from the SLU presidency in June 2025.

== Published works ==
=== Books ===
- Sentiments and Acts. (Aldine de Gruyter, 1993). Co-authored with Irwin Deutscher and H. Frances G. Pestello. Book received a Special Recognition Award from the Charles Horton Cooley Committee of the Society for the Study of Symbolic Interaction, 1994.

=== Articles ===
Pestello has published articles on topics ranging from hospices and public policy to faculty hiring practices in Catholic colleges, including:

- "Faculty Attitudes and Hiring Practices at Selected Catholic Colleges and Universities." Current Issues in Catholic Higher Education (2001) with James L. Heft and Ronald M. Katsuyama
- "Discounting." Journal of Contemporary Ethnography (1991)
- "The Social Construction of Grades." Teaching Sociology (1987)
- "White Opposition: To Busing or to Desegregation?" Social Science Quarterly (1982)
