= Robert S. Johnston =

Robert S. Johnston was an American university president. He was president of Saint Louis University from 1930 to 1936. A teacher of classics, English, and mathematics, he worked for four years at Detroit College and then at St. Xavier High School in Cincinnati, from 1901 to 1902.

Johnston's presidency at Saint Louis University was marked by its continued move back into the community at large, a community from which SLU had withdrawn in the 1910s, and by the growing decay of the area surrounding the school, caused by the Great Depression. The most significant event, however, was the departure of the theology faculty, whose members left for St. Mary's College in 1931.

== See also ==
- List of presidents of Saint Louis University
