= Peter Verhaegen =

Belgian Jesuit (1800–1868)

The Very Reverend Peter Verhaegen SJ
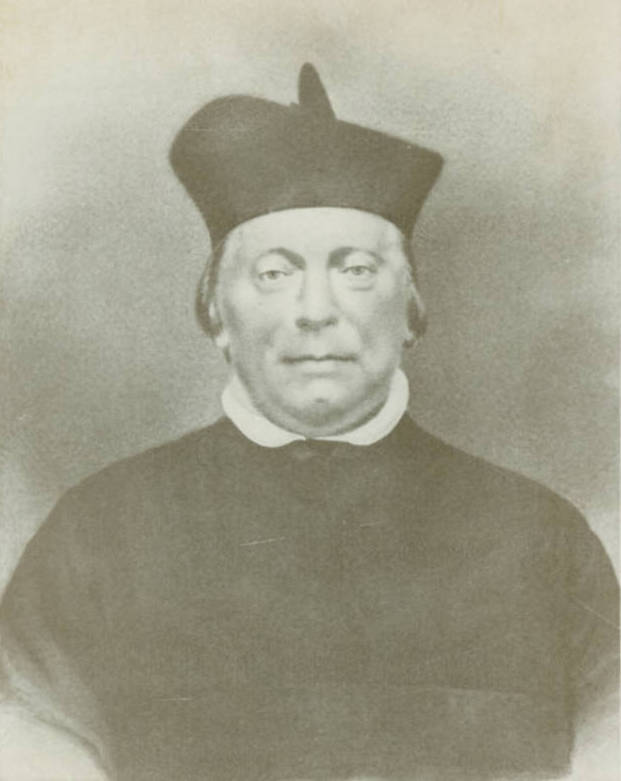
- Verhaegen as president of Saint Louis University

1st President of Saint Louis University
- In office 1829–1836
- Preceded by: Charles Felix Van Quickenborne
- Succeeded by: John A. Elet

Personal details
- Born: Pierre Joseph Verhægen; June 21, 1800 Haacht, Dyle, French Republic
- Died: July 21, 1868 (aged 68) Grand Coteau, Louisiana, United States
- Relations: Pierre-Théodore Verhaegen (brother)
- Education: Major Seminary in Mechelen

Orders
- Ordination: 1826 by Joseph Rosati

Peter Joseph Verhaegen SJ (born Pierre Joseph Verhæegen; June 21, 1800 – July 21, 1868) was a Belgian Catholic priest, Jesuit, and missionary to the Midwestern United States who became the first president of Saint Louis University and St. Joseph's College in Bardstown, Kentucky.

Born in the United Netherlands, Verhaegen traveled to the United States at the age of 21, where he studied at the Jesuit novitiate in Maryland. In 1823, he was sent to Missouri, and eventually became the president of Saint Louis University in 1829, of which the Jesuits had newly assumed responsibility. During his leadership, the college was chartered by the state and was elevated to the status of university. In 1836, Verhaegen became the superior of the Jesuits' Missouri Mission, which was elevated to a vice province in 1839.

In 1845, Verhaegen became the provincial superior of the Jesuits' Maryland Province, where he remained until 1848 when he became the first president of St. Joseph's College in Kentucky. In his later years, he taught theology and preached at Saint Louis University.

== Early life ==
Peter Joseph Verhaegen was born on June 21, 1800, in Haacht, in the department of Dyle, French First Republic (now in Belgium). His brother was Pierre-Théodore Verhaegen, a liberal and freemason, who became the president of the Belgian Chamber of Representatives. He studied theology at the Major Seminary in Mechelen. While there, he and six other seminarians met Charles Nerinckx, who was raising funds for his missions in the Diocese of Bardstown in the United States. They decided to join him, in traveling to the United States, where they would enter the Society of Jesus and become missionaries.

On August 15, 1821, they departed from Texel, traveling in secret because they were required to serve in the military. They arrived in Philadelphia on September 23, and then traveled on to Georgetown in Washington, D.C., and ultimately to White Marsh, Maryland. They entered the Jesuit novitiate there on October 21, 1821.

Under the direction of Charles Felix Van Quickenborne, Verhaegen was sent along with a group of other novices to establish a mission in Missouri. They left White Marsh on April 14, 1823, and St. Louis on May 30. They then traveled up the Missouri River and arrived at the site of the new novitiate, located 17 miles (27 km) from St. Louis, several days later.

Since Verhaegen had nearly completed his studies at the Mechelen seminary, he was responsible for instructing the younger novices in theology and philosophy. Meanwhile, he continued to complete his own studies for the priesthood. He was ordained a priest by Bishop Joseph Rosati of St. Louis in 1826, at St. Mary's of the Barrens Seminary. Verhaegen began his ministry in St. Charles, while also periodically visiting Catholics in St. Louis and elsewhere. At the time, there was only a simple, wooden church in St. Charles, and Verhaegen was involved in the construction of a new, larger, stone church, which opened in 1827.

== Saint Louis University ==
In 1829, the Jesuits assumed control of Saint Louis College. At the same time, Verhaegen was named to succeed Van Quickenborne as the fourth president of the college. During his tenure, the college was formally chartered by the Missouri General Assembly as Saint Louis University, thereby becoming the first university west of the Mississippi River. As such, Verhaegen became the first president of the new university. He oversaw construction of the university's first permanent building, and also designed its curriculum.

According to William Barnaby Faherty, Verhaegen was a key leader in building Catholicism in the West from his arrival 1823. As the first Jesuit president of St. Louis College, he Americanized the Jesuits, created a curriculum to fit frontier needs, integrated the school into Catholic life, moved the school to a bigger campus, and established a medical department.

== Missouri vice provincial ==
In 1836, Verhaegen became the superior of the Jesuits' Missouri mission, thereby resigning his post as president of Saint Louis University, where he was succeeded by John A. Elet. During his leadership, a mission to the Kickapoo tribe was established near Fort Leavenworth, Kansas, in 1836, and a mission to the Pottawatomie tribe was established in Council Bluffs, Iowa, in 1838. The province also took over an existing diocesan mission to the Pottawatomie in Sugar Creek, Missouri, the following year. Verhaegen also sent a group of Jesuits to relieve a contingent of French Jesuits as professors at the newly established St. Charles College in Grand Coteau, Louisiana, for which the Missouri Vice Province assumed responsibility.

The Jesuit Superior General in Rome elevated the Missouri mission to a vice province on December 24, 1839. When news of this decree reached St. Louis on March 9, 1840, Verhaegen was elevated to vice provincial superior. That year, he sent Pierre-Jean De Smet as the first Jesuit missionary to the Native Americans in the Rocky Mountains and Oregon Country. Around 1840, Verhaegen also became the apostolic administrator of the Diocese of St. Louis.

As vice provincial, Verhaegen also saw to the establishment of the Saint Louis University School of Medicine. His tenure in the office came to an end in 1842, and he was succeeded by James Oliver Van de Velde. He spent the next two years as superior of the Jesuit residence in St. Charles, Missouri, and pastor of St. Charles Borromeo Church.

== Later years ==
Verhaegen was made the provincial superior of the Jesuit Maryland province on January 4, 1845, replacing James A. Ryder. He held the position until January 26, 1848, when he returned to Missouri and was succeeded by Ignatius Brocard. In 1848, he became the first president of St. Joseph's College in Bardstown, Kentucky, which was newly under the control of the Missouri Vice Province. He proved to be popular among the students, but his health began to deteriorate, and he resigned the presidency three years later. He once again became the superior of the Jesuit residence in St. Charles.

In 1857, Verhaegen returned to Saint Louis University as the chair of theology and professor of moral and dogmatic theology at the Jesuit scholasticate. He also delivered lectures at St. Francis Xavier College Church. When the scholasticate was removed the following year from the university to College Hill, Verhaegen retired to the residence in St. Charles, where he died on July 21, 1868. He was buried in the Jesuit cemetery in Florissant, Missouri.

Academic offices
Preceded by Charles Felix Van Quickenborne	1st President of Saint Louis University; 1829–1836	Succeeded by John A. Elet
Preceded by –	1st President of St. Joseph's College; 1848–1851	Succeeded by –
Catholic Church titles
Preceded by –	Mission Superior of the Jesuit Missouri Mission; 1836–1839	Succeeded by Himself as Vice Provincial Superior
Preceded by Himself as Mission Superior	Vice Provincial Superior of the Jesuit Missouri Vice Province; 1839–1842	Succeeded by James Oliver Van de Velde
Preceded by James A. Ryder	5th Provincial Superior of the Jesuit Maryland Province; 1845–1848	Succeeded by Ignatius Brocard
