= Jackson Nickerson =

American academic (born 1962)

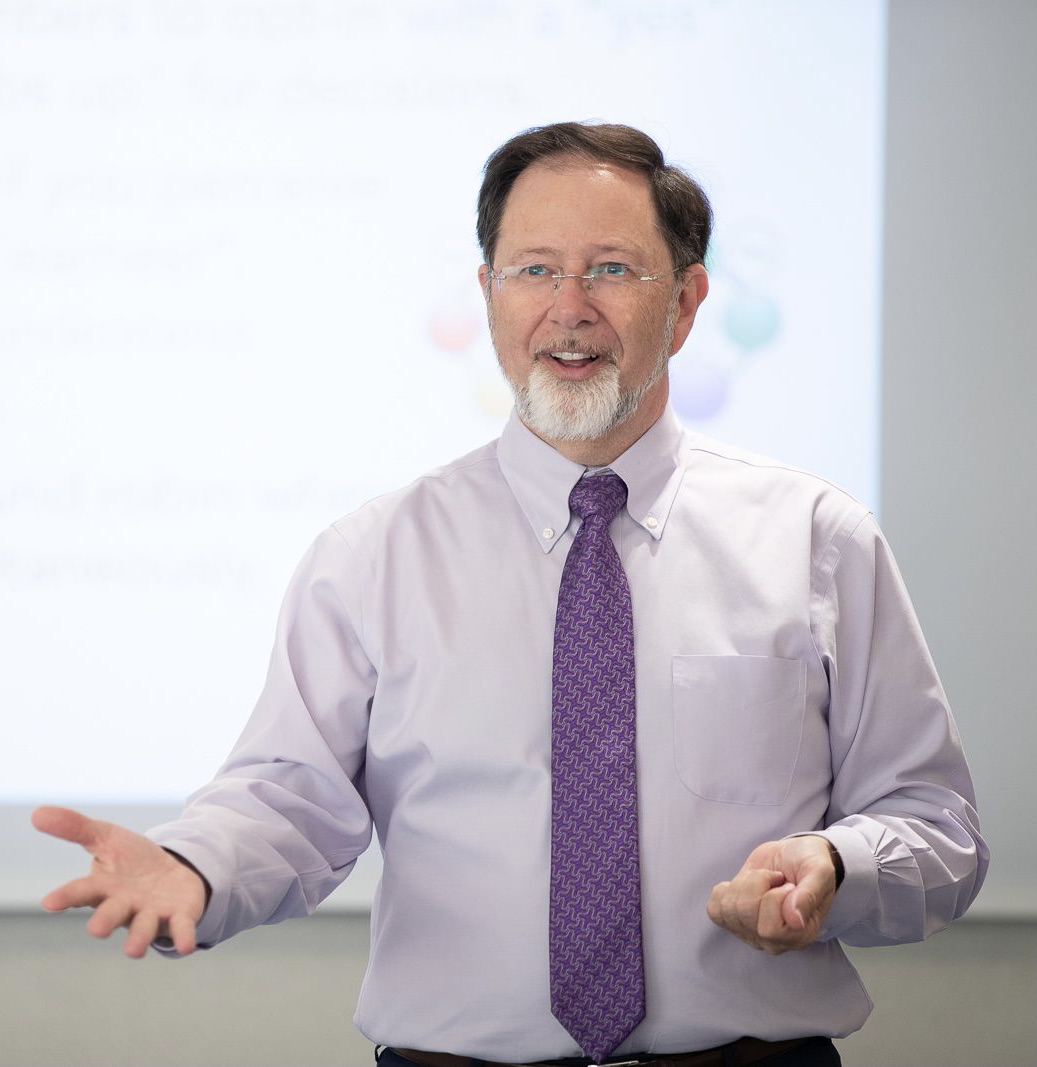
- Born: 1962 (age 63–64); Weymouth, Massachusetts, U.S.
- Education: UC Berkeley; WPI
- Scientific career
- Fields: Leadership education, Transaction Cost Economics
- Workplaces: Saint Louis University (2024-); Washington University in St. Louis (1996-2023)
- Doctoral advisor: Oliver E. Williamson

Jackson Nickerson (born 1962) is an American academic who studies leadership, organizations, and strategy. He is the Edward Jones Dean of the Richard A. Chaifetz School of Business at Saint Louis University. Nickerson was the Frahm Family Professor of Organization and Strategy (Emeritus) in Olin Business School at Washington University in St. Louis. He also was the Associate Dean and Director of Brookings Executive Education from 2009 to 2017, was a non-resident Senior Fellow in Governance Studies at the Brookings Institution from 2010 to 2020, and is a Fellow of the Strategic Management Society.

== Biography ==
Nickerson grew up in Weymouth, Massachusetts, and attended Worcester Polytechnic Institute where he received a Bachelor of Science in Mechanical Engineering, followed by a Master in Mechanical Engineering at University of California, Berkeley. He worked for NASA’s Jet Propulsion Laboratory before returning to Berkeley for a Master in Business Administration from the Haas School of Business. He later returned to Haas for a Ph.D., simultaneously working for six years as a consultant for the Law and Economics Consulting Group.

Nickerson was appointed Assistant Professor at Olin Business School in 1996 and was promoted to associate professor in 2001 and full professor in 2005. He was named the Frahm Family Professor of Organization and Strategy in 2007 and received emeritus status in 2020. After becoming strategy group chair in 2008, he was appointed Director of Brookings Executive Education in 2009 and became its Associate Dean in 2010. In 2009 he became a non-resident Senior Fellow in Governance Studies at the Brookings Institution, and he was the first Senior Visiting Fellow at the Grameen Foundation in 2010 and 2011. From 2013 through 2014, he wrote the leadership column “Ask EIG: Leadership insights for Federal managers” for Government Executive Online. He has been a speaker for the Institute of Management Studies since 2014. In 2019, Nickerson received the Strategic Management Society's Education Impact Award. Melbourne Business School named Nickerson the 2023 Sir Donald Hibberd Lecturer; his lecture addressed the sources and prevention of industrial catastrophes. On July 1, 2024, Saint Louis University appointed him Edward Jones Dean of the Chaifetz School of Business.

== Research Areas ==
Nickerson's early research built upon Oliver Williamson’s transaction cost economics to predict the antecedents and performance consequences of organizational choices in a wide variety of empirical settings and industries. Along with Todd Zenger, he introduced the concepts of organizational vacillation and envy as foundations for firm boundaries. He is also credited with introducing the Problem-Finding and Problem-Solving Perspective, which provides a knowledge-based foundation for a theory of firm boundaries, organizational choice, entrepreneurship, and the design of group processes to overcome biases.

== Entrepreneurship ==
In 1995, Nickerson co-founded the Intellectual Capital Management Group. In 2006, he co-founded NFORMD.NET. The company, through its subsidiary StudentSuccess.org, provided sexual assault prevention training at over 350 colleges and universities and to the US Army. Between 2009 and 2012, he was a board member of Clean Tech Bio-fuels. He also is a co-founder of Acquilang LLC and EPC Learning Labs LLC.

== Curriculum innovations ==
Nickerson is a co-creator of Critical Thinking@Olin, an approach to teaching critical thinking that won the inaugural MBA Roundtable Innovator Award. The approach was taught to other business schools as part of AACSB's Curriculum Development Series. In conjunction with AACSB, he developed Leading in the Academic Enterprise, an approach for developing leaders in academia. Through Brookings Executive Education, he developed and launched Leading Thinking, an approach to leadership in which inquiry and critical thinking are central. In a video accompanying his 2019 Strategic Management Society Educational Impact Award, Nickerson described the differences between pedagogy, andragogy, and mbagogy.

== Books ==
- Leading in Government: Practical advice to leadership questions from the front lines'.ASIN 0692752935 J.A. Nickerson, Brookings Executive Education, 2016.
- Leading Change from the Middle: A Practical Guide to Building Extraordinary Capabilities'.ASIN B00II90HX0 J.A. Nickerson, Brookings Press, 2014.
- Tackling Wicked Government Problems: A Practical Guide for Enterprise Leaders. J.A. Nickerson and R. Sanders (eds.), Brookings Press, 2013.ASIN 0815726392
- Jackson Nickerson (25 September 2013). Leading Change in a Web 2.1 World: How ChangeCasting Builds Trust, Creates Understanding, and Accelerates Organizational Change. Brookings Institution Press. ISBN 978-0-8157-2542-8.
- Economic Institutions of Strategy. J. A. Nickerson and B. S. Silverman (eds.), Advances in Strategic Management (Vol. 26), Emerald Group Publishing Limited, 2009.ASIN 1848554869
