= Aisle411 =

American consumer service

aisle411
- Industry: Mobile application development
- Founded: 2008
- Founders: Nathan Pettyjohn, Matthew Kulig
- Headquarters: St. Louis, Missouri
- Website: aisle411.com

aisle411 Inc. is a St. Louis-based company that has developed a phone application called aisle411, which allows customers to search retail stores for specific product. aisle411 entered the market in August 2009, co-founded by Nathan Pettyjohn and Matthew Kulig in 2008.

== History ==
In August 2009, aisle411 launched its service for Ace Hardware and Price Cutter stores in the St. Louis and Springfield, MO areas. In 2010, aisle411 launched its mobile smartphone service with Shop 'n Save, a grocery chain owned by Supervalu and Schnucks grocery stores in the St. Louis, MO area. In September 2011, WinCo Foods partnered with aisle411 to include its stores in the application. In December 2011, Hy-Vee, a grocery chain of 235 store locations, added its stores into aisle411. In September 2012, Walgreens connected over 7,800 locations to the aisle411 platform.

In September 2012, aisle411 acquired the technology assets of WiLocate to implement indoor positioning technology to its mobile application. In September 2013, aisle411 raised $6.3 million in its first round of financing - led by St. Louis-based Cultivation Capital - to help the company scale, meet demand and expand retail partnerships. Billiken Angels Network has invested in aisle411.

== Services ==
aisle411 application allows consumers to use smartphone to pull up a map pinpointing the aisle and location of an object in a particular store. The aisle411 platform is made available for licensing to retailers, and 3rd parties through an API and Map SDK. Shoppers can also use the app to scan barcodes to read product reviews and find out about in-store discounts and promotions.
