= Paul C. Reinert =

Paul C. Reinert President, St. Louis University 1949-1974
- Born: August 12, 1910; Boulder, Colorado
- Died: July 22, 2001 (aged 90); St. Louis, Missouri
- Occupations: Catholic university administrator Jesuit priest
- Awards: Forty honorary doctorates

Academic background
- Education: University of Chicago

Rev. Paul Clare Reinert, S.J., (August 12, 1910 – July 22, 2001) was the president of Saint Louis University for twenty-five years and a community leader in St. Louis, Missouri, USA.

== Life and works ==
Paul Reinert was born in Boulder, Colorado, on August 12, 1910, to Francis and Emma Reinert. In 1927, he entered the Society of Jesus. Two of his brothers, James and Carl, also became Jesuit priests. Paul was ordained to the priesthood in 1940 and received both an A.B. (1927) and a M.A. (1934) from Saint Louis University. He then served as register at St. Mary’s College in Kansas before earning a Ph.D. from the University of Chicago (1944). After completing his Ph.D., he returned to Saint Louis University to serve as the Dean of the College of Arts and Sciences (1944–1948), vice-president (1948–1949), and president (1949–1974). After retiring from the presidency, he served as chancellor (1974–1991) and chancellor emeritus (1991–2001) until his death in 2001.

During his twenty-five year tenure as president, Reinert transformed the university and was a vocal advocate for social justice. Reinert’s presidency of Saint Louis University marked a seminal period in the history of the university, Catholic education, and American education in general. He faced an increased post-war enrollment in higher education and the necessary changes in curriculum. Under his administration, the university admitted women as regular students. In addition, while a junior administrator, he worked for the admission of the first African-American students to the university in 1944. Saint Louis University thus became the first historically white university in a former slave state to admit African-American students.

As the country’s cities faced increased racial tensions and urban universities dealt with the dilemma of the "white flight", Reinert committed the institution to remain in urban St. Louis, as other American universities left their urban origins. As a result, Reinert became a leader in the revitalization of the inner city of St. Louis and the promotion of higher education on the divide line between the north, black part of the city and south, all-white neighborhoods. His 1958 appointment to the Missouri Governor’s Committee of Education beyond High School eventually led to the formation of the St. Louis Junior College District in 1962 upon the recommendation of Dr. Ernest V. Hollis of the U.S. Department of Education and Edward B. Shils. He also was the member of other important state, federal, and Catholic education committees that established policies that set the standard for education in his time.

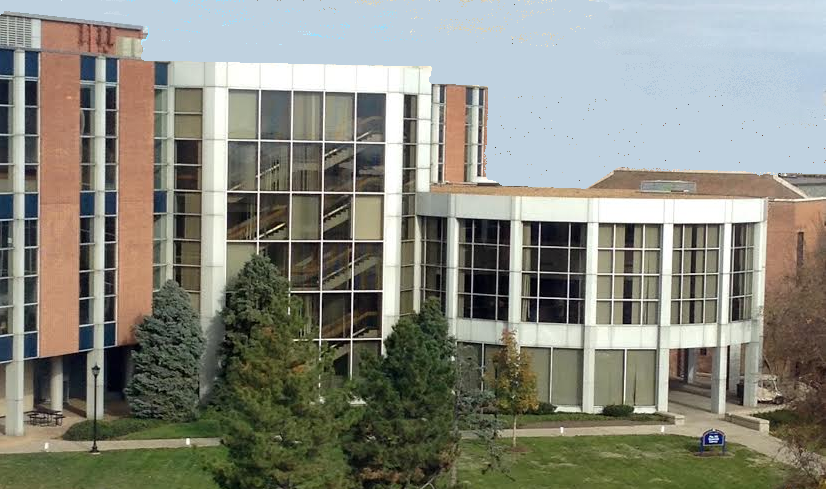
Pius XII Library, east entrance

As a national leader in Catholic education, Reinert remained confident in the advantages that private Catholic colleges and universities offered to their communities. He sought to expand Saint Louis University’s campus and to create programs that would attract minority students to a historically white university. After building the spacious Pius XII library on campus, he negotiated the microfilming of the Vatican's rare manuscripts collection, adding to the research facilities of the university.

Under Reinert’s direction in 1967, Saint Louis University became the first Catholic university to include lay member on its board of trustees. This reorganization initiated a trend that transformed Catholic higher education in America. In addition to this reorganization, he appointed lay professionals to high-ranking administrative positions in the university. Even though critics believed that Reinert’s decision conflicted with his position as a Jesuit and diluted the university’s Jesuit nature, Reinert and others believed that the changes both reaffirmed the Ignatian educational mission and broadened the university’s vision for the future. Moreover, his reorganization of the university demonstrated the increased status of the university and its dedication to serving the community. He continued to serve the community after his retirement as president in 1974.

In 1962, across Grand Boulevard from the University 22 acres were purchased to accommodate Busch Student Center, sports fields, a large classroom building, and a three-building science complex with a large hall under its courtyard. In 1969 an SLU campus was opened in Madrid.

Reinert’s publications include two books concerning the status of Catholic higher education, The Urban Catholic University (1970) and To Turn the Tide (1972), and a history of the university since the war, Seasons of Change: Reflections on Half a Century of Saint Louis University, co-authored with Paul Shore (1996).

Reinert died July 22, 2001, in St. Louis, Missouri. Reinert Hall, a residence hall at St. Louis University, is named in his honor, in addition to the Reinert Center for Teaching Excellence. For his work, Reinert has been honored with a star on the St. Louis Walk of Fame. He also was the recipient of nearly forty honorary doctorates and countless awards for his service,
