= Jeff Geerling =

American YouTuber

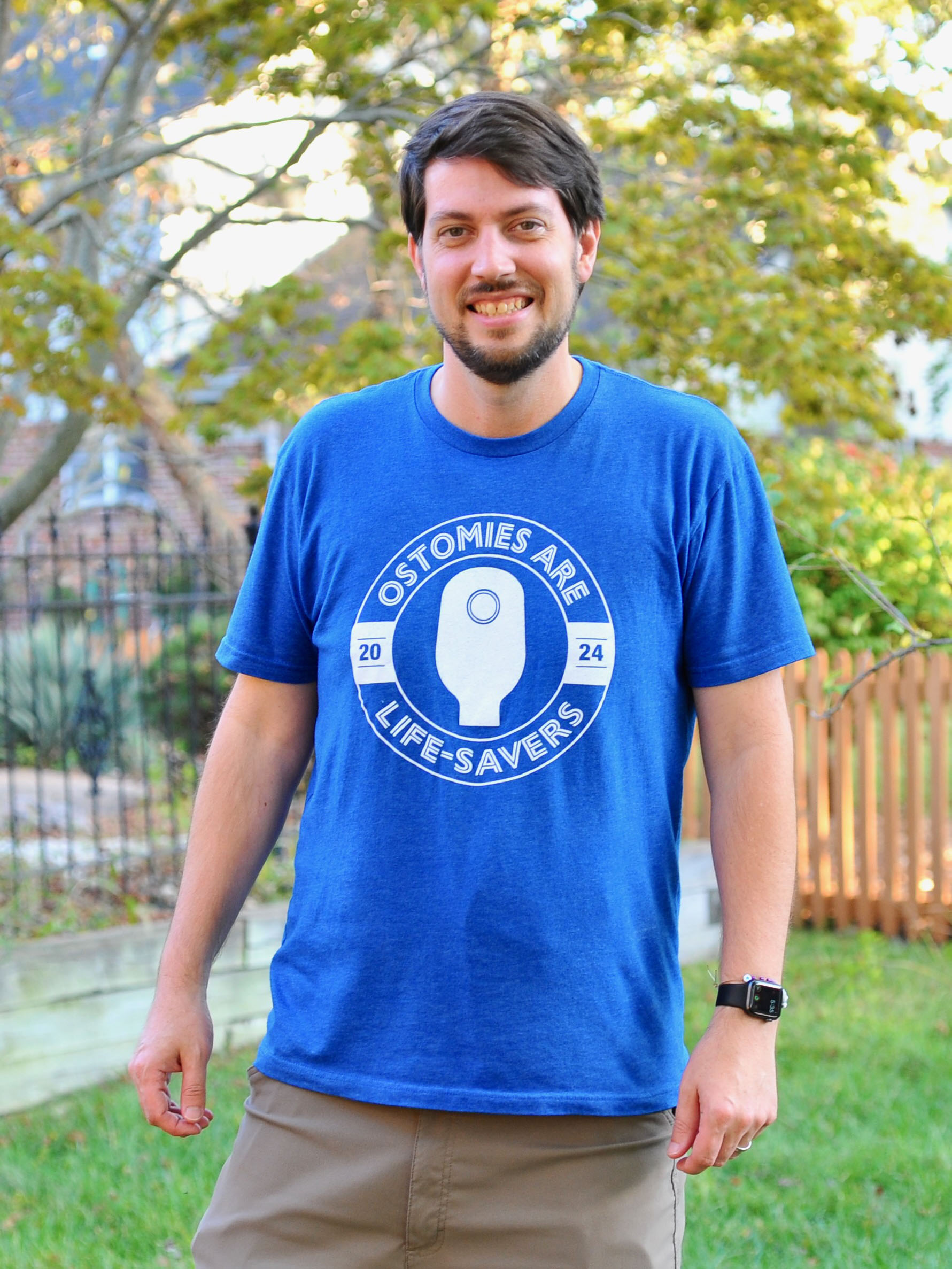
- Born: Jeff Geerling
- Education: St. Louis University; Kenrick–Glennon Seminary

YouTube information
- Channels: Jeff Geerling; Level 2 Jeff; Geerling Engineering
- Years active: 2019–present
- Genre: Engineering
- Subscribers: 1.05 million (JeffGeerling); 152 thousand (Level 2 Jeff); 131 thousand (Geerling Engineering)
- Views: 195 million (JeffGeerling); 15.6 million (Level 2 Jeff) 12 million; (Geerling Engineering)
- Last updated: March 12, 2026
- Website: www.jeffgeerling.com github.com/geerlingguy

Jeff Geerling is an American author, open-source software developer, and hardware reviewer best known for his YouTube channel.

== Career ==
Geerling has worked as a web developer, beginning his career building a website that displayed song titles and artists for radio station KYKY for his father. He is also an author of books on Ansible and Kubernetes.

=== YouTube ===
Geerling became a full-time content creator in 2021 for his self titled Jeff Geerling YouTube channel, focusing on single-board computers, software programming, and home servers and supported by sponsorships and Patreon members. In particular, he has become recognized for his various projects using Raspberry Pi computers with very large storage arrays, high-performance compute, clusters, and external GPUs.

Geerling later started a second YouTube channel Geerling Engineering to discuss radio engineering with his father, who is a radio engineer.

In 2024, Geerling received attention after noticing his voice was cloned without consent by the electronics manufacturer Elecrow, and the company subsequently apologized and removed the offending content. Geerling's experience was cited as a case meant to be addressed by YouTube's likeness-detection technology when it was released in 2025.

== Personal life ==
Geerling intended to become a priest, attending at St. Louis University and Kenrick–Glennon Seminary, before leaving the seminary to get married. As of 2024, he is married and has children.

Geerling was diagnosed with Crohn's disease and had ileostomy surgery in 2018 to treat it. He subsequently wrote a book about life with the disease.
