= Sridhar Condoor =

- Born: Nellore, India
- Education: Ph.D. (Mechanical Engineering) (Texas A&M University), M.S. (Design Engineering) (Indian Institute of Technology), B.S. (Mechanical Engineering) (Jawaharlal Nehru Technological University)
- Known for: Weekly Innovation Challenge program, iScholars program
- Awards: Kern Entrepreneurship Education Network Excellence Award (2013), Kern Entrepreneurship Education Network Best in Class Award (2012)
- Scientific career
- Workplaces: Parks College of Engineering, Aviation and Technology

Sridhar Condoor is an Indian American academic who is the Chair of the Aerospace and Mechanical Engineering department at Saint Louis University's School of Science and Engineering. He is a KEEN fellow, a Coleman Fellow, the editor of the Journal of Engineering Entrepreneurship.

Condoor is spearheading Technology Entrepreneurship education at Saint Louis University via Weekly Innovation Challenges, iScholars program, Idea to Product (I2P), and funded research. He is the Principal Investigator for the Kern Entrepreneurship Education Network (KEEN) Program Development Grants to foster the spirit of innovation in engineering students.

== Research ==
Condoor is the inventor VayuWind, a hubless wind turbine for urban environments. VayuWind is a Vertical Axis Wind Turbine (VAWT) which deploys airfoils parallel to the rotational axis. It improves on the traditional VAWT by using a ring frame leaving the central portion open for other uses. This feature enables VayuWind to extract wind power using existing structures such as utility poles, commercial buildings and skywalks with minimal noise pollution. VayuWind adds space saving and aesthetics to the benefits of the traditional VAWT (changing wind directions and bird-friendly nature) making it an ideal turbine for urban environment.

== Honors and awards ==
- Kern Entrepreneurship Education Network Excellence Award (2013). The award recognizes "Innovation Challenges" iBook as an outstanding innovative educational practice that can be transferable to other educational institutions.
- Saint Louis University Faculty Excellence Award (2012)

== Notable publications ==
- Condoor, S. S., & Keogh, G. (2012) "Weekly Innovation Challenge: Mind Workouts for Teams".
- Condoor, Sridhar; Kroll, E. (May 2008). "Parameter analysis for the application of the principle of direct and short transmission path: a valve-actuator design case study". Journal of Engineering Design. 19 (4): 337–357. doi:10.1080/09544820701452042. S2CID 109525520.
- Kroll, E., Condoor, S. S., & Jansson, D. G. (2001). Innovative conceptual design: theory and application of parameter analysis. Cambridge Univ Press. ISBN 0521778484.
