= Richard Cusimano =

American historian

- Born: Richard Charles Cusimano; October 17, 1939; New Orleans, Louisiana, U.S.
- Died: May 28, 2024 (aged 84); Lafayette, Louisiana, U.S.
- Education: Saint Louis University; University of Georgia
- Occupation: Historian

Richard Charles Cusimano (October 17, 1939 – May 28, 2024) was an American historian.

== Life and career ==
Cusimano was born in New Orleans, Louisiana, the son of Frank and Grace Cusimano. He attended and graduated from Jesuit High School. After graduating, he attended Saint Louis University, earning his master’s degree. He also attended the University of Georgia, earning his PhD degree in European history.

Cusimano served as a professor in the department of history at the University of Louisiana at Lafayette from 1970 to 2004. During his years as a professor, in 2004, he was named a distinguished professor.

== Death ==
Cusimano died on May 28, 2024, in Lafayette, Louisiana, at the age of 84.
