= Logical access control =

In computers, logical access controls are tools and protocols used for identification, authentication, authorization, and accountability in computer information systems. Logical access is often needed for remote access of hardware and is often contrasted with the term "physical access", which refers to interactions (such as a lock and key) with hardware in the physical environment, where equipment is stored and used.

== Models ==
Logical access controls enforce access control measures for systems, programs, processes, and information. The controls can be embedded within operating systems, applications, add-on security packages, or database and telecommunication management systems.

The line between logical access and physical access can be blurred when physical access is controlled by software. For example, entry to a room may be controlled by a chip and PIN card and an electronic lock controlled by software. Only those in possession of an appropriate card, with an appropriate security level and with knowledge of the PIN are permitted entry to the room. On swiping the card into a card reader and entering the correct PIN code.

Logical controls, also called logical access controls and technical controls, protect data and the systems, networks, and environments that protect them. In order to authenticate, authorize, or maintain accountability a variety of methodologies are used such as password protocols, devices coupled with protocols and software, encryption, firewalls, or other systems that can detect intruders and maintain security, reduce vulnerabilities and protect the data and systems from threats.

Businesses, organizations and other entities use a wide spectrum of logical access controls to protect hardware from unauthorized remote access. These can include sophisticated password programs, advanced biometric security features, or any other setups that effectively identify and screen users at any administrative level.

The particular logical access controls used in a given facility and hardware infrastructure partially depend on the nature of the entity that owns and administrates the hardware setup. Government logical access security is often different from business logical access security, where federal agencies may have specific guidelines for controlling logical access. Users may be required to hold security clearances or go through other screening procedures that complement secure password or biometric functions. This is all part of protecting the data kept on a specific hardware setup.

Militaries and governments use logical access biometrics to protect their large and powerful networks and systems which require very high levels of security. It is essential for the large networks of police forces and militaries where it is used not only to gain access but also in six main essential applications. Without logical access control security systems highly confidential information would be at risk of exposure.

There is a wide range of biometric security devices and software available for different levels of security needs. There are very large complex biometric systems for large networks that require absolute airtight security and there are less expensive systems for use in office buildings and smaller institutions.
