= Michelle Mainelli =

American meteorologist

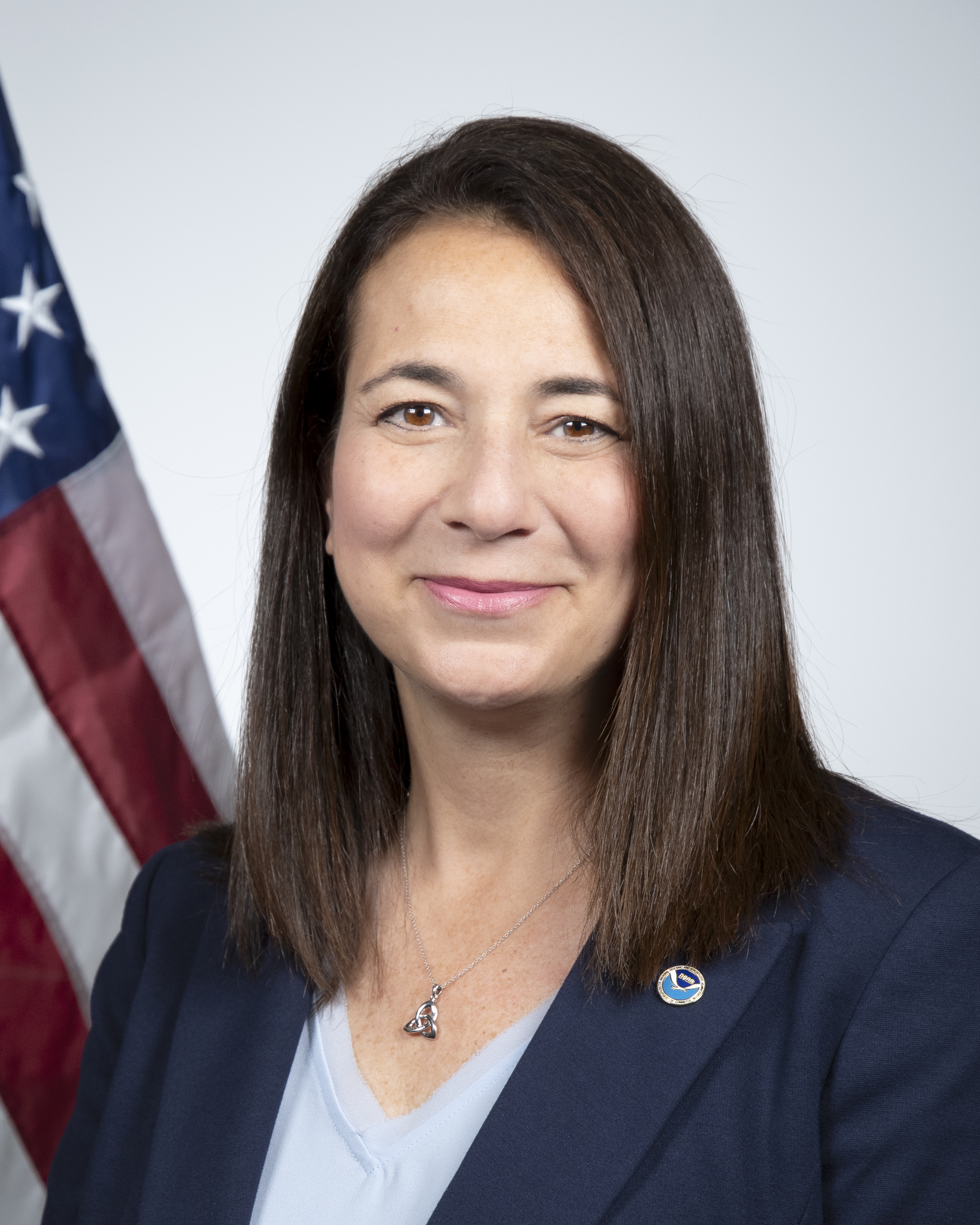
- Official Portrait

Deputy Director of the National Weather Service
- Incumbent
- Assumed office November 5, 2023
- Preceded by: Mary C. Erickson

Personal details
- Born: Providence, Rhode Island, U.S.
- Children: 2
- Education: St. Louis University; University of Miami; Phoenix University
- Occupation: Meteorologist

Michelle M. Mainelli-McInerney (born September 9, 1970), usually known as Michelle Mainelli and previously known as Michelle Mainelli Huber, is an American meteorologist and government official. She currently serves as deputy director of the National Weather Service (NWS).

== Early life and education ==
Mainelli grew up in Providence, Rhode Island, where she developed an interest in weather after experiencing the Blizzard of 1978 as a child. She also has attributed her interest in meteorology to her father, who maintained weather instruments on the roof of their house during her childhood.

Mainelli attended St. Louis University, where she studied meteorology under Dr. James T. Moore, among others, and graduated in 1992 with a Bachelor of Science degree in the subject. She also holds a Master of Science degree in meteorology and physical oceanography from the University of Miami, as well as an MBA in Technology Management from the University of Phoenix.

== Career ==
Mainelli began her career with NWS while still in college, serving as a meteorologist intern at the St. Louis Weather Forecast Office (WFO) beginning her junior year. After graduating, she was hired full-time at the St. Louis WFO and continued to work there until 1993, when she began working at the National Hurricane Center (NHC) in Miami, Florida, initially as a meteorologist programmer. She transitioned to the Tropical Satellite Analysis and Forecasting unit (now the Tropical Analysis and Forecast Branch) of NHC the following year. In 2006, she became the center’s first female hurricane specialist. She has described drawing surface analyses for the tropics as “therapeutic.”

After 15 years at NHC, she moved to the NWS National Centers for Environmental Prediction (NCEP), where she worked in various roles at NCEP Central Operations, including as the deputy director from 2014 to 2016.

In 2016, she moved to NWS Headquarters in Silver Spring, Maryland, where she initially worked as a program manager in the Office of Dissemination Services, where she served as director from 2018 to 2023. In 2023, Mainelli was named deputy director of NWS.

== Honors and awards ==
Among the honors and awards Mainelli has received throughout her career are the following:

- Presidential Rank Award (2022)
- Senior Executives Association Spirit of Excellence in Diversity, Equity, Inclusion and Accessibility Award (2022)
- Department of Commerce Silver Medal (2015, 2005)

== Personal life ==
Mainelli is married to Mark McInerney, a meteorologist and climate scientist who works for NASA’s Earth Science Data and Information System (ESDIS) Project and has served as director of unidentified anomalous phenomena (UAP) research at NASA. The couple has a teenage daughter together. Mainelli also has an adult daughter from a previous marriage who is an elementary school teacher.
