= Jerome Katz =

Jerome A. Katz
- Born: Memphis, Tennessee, U.S.
- Education: Rhodes College (BA); University of Michigan (PhD)
- Occupation: Professor
- Employer: Saint Louis University
- Title: Robert H. Brockhaus Endowed Chair of Entrepreneurship
- Predecessor: Robert Brockhaus
- Website: entrepreneurshipeducation.info

Jerome A. Katz is an American professor, consultant and author who specializes in entrepreneurship. He is the Robert H. Brockhaus Endowed Chair of Entrepreneurship at Saint Louis University in St Louis, Missouri and Director of the Billiken Angels Network.

== Education ==
Katz attended Rhodes College in Memphis earning a BA in psychology. His PhD in organizational psychology from the University of Michigan was awarded in 1981.
