= Richard Chaifetz =

American businessman

Richard A. Chaifetz
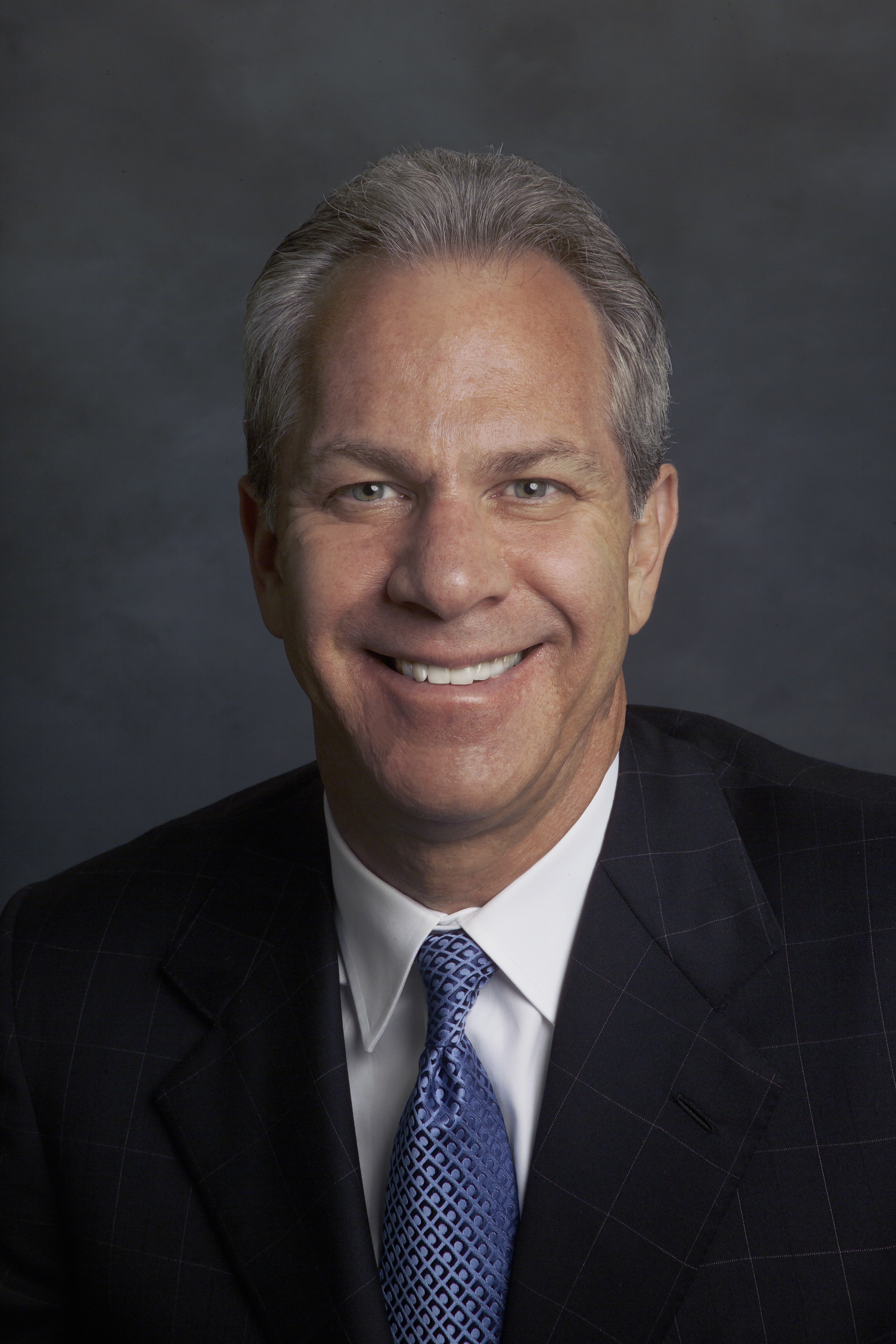
- Dr. Richard A. Chaifetz
- Born: August 1953 (age 73); Brooklyn, New York
- Education: Saint Louis University; Illinois School of Professional Psychology
- Occupations: Founder and Chairman, ComPsych Corporation; Chairman, Chaifetz Group; Partner and Co-Owner, San Francisco Giants; Co-Owner and Executive Partner, Portland Trail Blazers
- Known for: Business; Philanthropy; Investment; Sports

Richard A. Chaifetz (born August 1953) is an American billionaire businessman, investor, licensed neuropsychologist, and philanthropist with an approximate net worth ranging between $1.4 billion and $2.8 billion, as of 2024.

He is the Founder and Chairman of Chicago-based ComPsych Corporation, the world's largest provider of employee assistance programs. He is also the founder of the Chaifetz Group, a private investment firm focusing on venture and private equity, real estate, and sports investments.

He is the Co-Owner and Executive Partner of the Portland Trail Blazers, and is a Partner of the San Francisco Giants.

He appears regularly in The Wall Street Journal, USA Today, Bloomberg Businessweek, and Time. He has been listed in the Crain’s Chicago Business annual Who's Who list annually since 2004. He is the naming donor of Saint Louis University's Richard A. Chaifetz School of Business, Chaifetz Arena, and Chaifetz Center for Entrepreneurship.

Chaifetz is a principal-driven entrepreneur, and in 2024 penned an Entrepreneur Op-Ed detailing the 7 Guiding Principles I Used to Build My Billion-Dollar Business.

Chaifetz is a Saint Louis University Alumnus of the Year, and was inducted into the university’s Entrepreneurial Alumni Hall of Fame in 2007. Chaifetz Arena, located on the campus of Saint Louis University, was named after him following his $12 million donation to the university. In February 2018, Chaifetz donated another $15 million to Saint Louis University, bringing his total contribution to $27 million. The university has named the business school after him, the Richard A. Chaifetz School of Business, as well as the entrepreneurship center as the Chaifetz Center for Entrepreneurship, in recognition of his gift. His donations to Miami University funded the creation of the Chaifetz Trading Center at the school’s Farmer School of Business.

== Early life ==
Chaifetz was born in 1953 and is the oldest of four children. His parents divorced when he was 13. The family lived in Long Island, New York on his mother’s school teacher salary. Chaifetz went to Eastern Military Academy, an ROTC high school in Long Island.

Chaifetz was motivated to achieve early success after watching his mother struggle to raise four children after the divorce. At Eastern Military Academy he was a lacrosse player and one of two cadets from his class to receive appointments to the United States Military Academy at West Point, New York. He declined the appointment, choosing instead to attend Saint Louis University. During Chaifetz’s second semester of his freshman year of college, his father, with whom he had limited contact, suddenly stopped paying his tuition. Richard pleaded with the university’s president to remain in school. He said that if the university allowed him to stay, he would repay his tuition and "pay back the university in an even bigger way as soon as he became successful." Chaifetz was allowed to stay and worked a variety of jobs in order to meet his tuition obligations. He graduated magna cum laude with a degree in psychology in 1975. He received his doctorate from the Illinois School of Professional Psychology in 1981.

== Career ==
Chaifetz founded ComPsych Corporation, now the world's largest provider of employee assistance programs (EAPs), in 1984. Prior to that and immediately after graduation, he opened more than a dozen outpatient and inpatient treating centers serving the general public for the full range of mental health issues. As he expanded the centers with the goal of franchising the operation, he saw the market change from direct insurance reimbursement to an HMO model, prompting him to significantly change the focus of the business. ComPsych then began providing psychological services directly to employers on a capitation fee basis.

In addition to EAP services, ComPsych began to expand its offerings over the years to include work-life services, legal and financial resources, behavioral health and outsourced HR services. By 2012 ComPsych was serving more than 17,000 organizations and 45 million individuals worldwide. By 2018, the company reportedly covered more than 100 million workers in 160 countries and more than 45,000 employers.

In 2011, Chaifetz launched and became the founding chairman of the Chaifetz Group, a venture capital and private equity firm focusing on venture capital and growth investing. In 2014, The Chaifetz Group invested in Pixel Press, a St. Louis-based company that allows users to turn drawings into video games. Additional Chaifetz Group investment holdings include Fooda, Cargo, 15Five, ParkWhiz (now Arrive), Repurpose, Factor 75, BacklotCars and SaveWave Energy.

He is a member of The Economic Club of Chicago, and The Executives’ Club of Chicago. He has served on the board of directors of several public and private corporations including Pixel Press, Kennet Partners, Access MediQuip, Trading Partners Holdings, Amerihost Properties, and NueVista Holdings. He also serves on the boards of non-profit organizations including The Field Museum of Natural History Board of Trustees, the Miami University Farmer School of Business, Saint Louis University Board of Trustees, the Illinois Holocaust Museum, the Brain Research Foundation and TCS Education System.

== Philanthropy ==
Chaifetz donated $12 million to Saint Louis University in 2007. The donation was the lead gift used to build Chaifetz Arena, an $80 million 10,600-seat sports facility which houses the university’s men’s and women’s basketball teams. Chaifetz was named Saint Louis University’s Alumni of the Year and was inducted into the University’s Entrepreneurial Alumni Hall of Fame later that year.

Chaifetz and his wife Jill donated $3 million to Miami University in November 2007. The donation funded the Chaifetz Trading Center at the Miami University's Farmer School of Business. The Chaifetzes also donated to the Field Museum of Natural History in 2008. The amount of the donation was not released to the public, but the couple is listed among donors giving $1 million to $2 million in the museum’s 2008 annual report.

Chaifetz was awarded the 2014 Frederic A. Gibbs Discovery Award in Philanthropy by the Brain Research Foundation.

In 2017, he was given the Humanitarian Award from the Illinois Holocaust Museum and Education Center, honoring his contribution to society through his business endeavors and his philanthropic activities.

In February 2018, Chaifetz donated another $15 million to Saint Louis University. The university has now named the business school after him, the Richard A. Chaifetz School of Business as well as the entrepreneurship center as the Chaifetz Center for Entrepreneurship.

== Sports ==
Chaifetz has been linked to attempts to buy multiple professional sports franchises. He was named as a potential buyer of the St. Louis Rams professional football team in 2010. The Rams were eventually sold to Stan Kroenke in August of that year.

In 2014, Chaifetz was an interested party to purchase the Milwaukee Bucks professional basketball team. Reportedly, Chaifetz became interested in the franchise due to his longtime friendship with basketball coach and Wisconsin native Rick Majerus, who had been the head coach of the Saint Louis University men’s basketball team in 2007 when Chaifetz donated $12 million to help build the team’s new arena. Chaifetz was also involved in a bid to acquire an additional unnamed National Basketball Association team, according to the Chicago Tribune in 2012.

In July 2017, it was reported that billionaire Chaifetz had backed out of a bid for the MLB's Miami Marlins that included Derek Jeter. Chaifetz, who was reported to contribute "multiple-hundreds of millions of dollars" to the group's bid, was uncomfortable with Jeter seeking a leadership role with the team while not investing much of his own capital.

In 2022, Chaifetz Group announced an investment in Team Liquid, a global esports organization. Team Liquid is the winningest and most watched esports team of all team, holding claim to 120+ major gaming tournament Championships and the most prize money earned in esports history.

In early 2023, the Chaifetz family announced that it had acquired an expansion franchise in Major League Pickleball, the St. Louis Shock. The Shock is wholly owned by the Chaifetz family and overseen by Richard's son, Ross Chaifetz. The Shock are regarded as MLP's marquee franchise, and are the 2025 MLP Cup Champions.

In June 2023, Chaifetz Group acquired a minority stake in the Alpine F1 Team, which competes in Formula One. The US-based investor group including Redbird Capital, Ryan Reynolds, Michael B. Jordan, Rob McElhenney and others reportedly acquired a 24% interest for $220mm, valuing the team at approximately $900mm.

In 2025, Chaifetz led a WNBA expansion bid which included a group of prospective owners including businessman David Hoffman and NBA player Jayson Tatum. Chaifetz reportedly remains interested in bringing a WNBA team to St. Louis.

In January 2026, Chaifetz Group announced that Richard Chaifetz had invested in and become a Partner and Co-Owner of the MLB's San Francisco Giants.

Chaifetz is Co-Owner and Executive Partner of the Portland Trail Blazers NBA franchise, which he acquired alongside Tom Dundon in March 2026.. He also serves as a Member of the team's Board of Directors, Member of the Executive Committee, and Head of the Executive Hiring Committee.
