= Chaifetz Arena =

Arena in St. Louis, Missouri, US

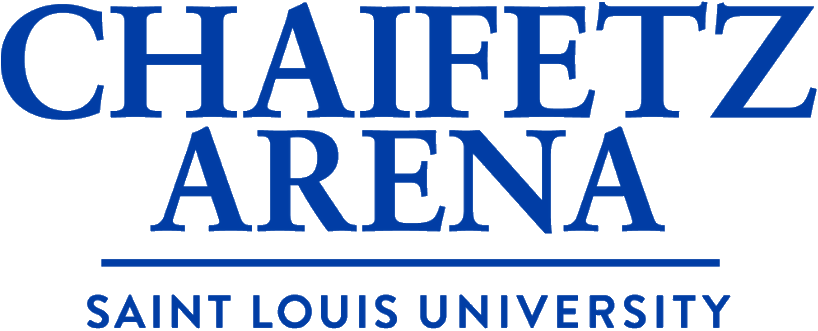

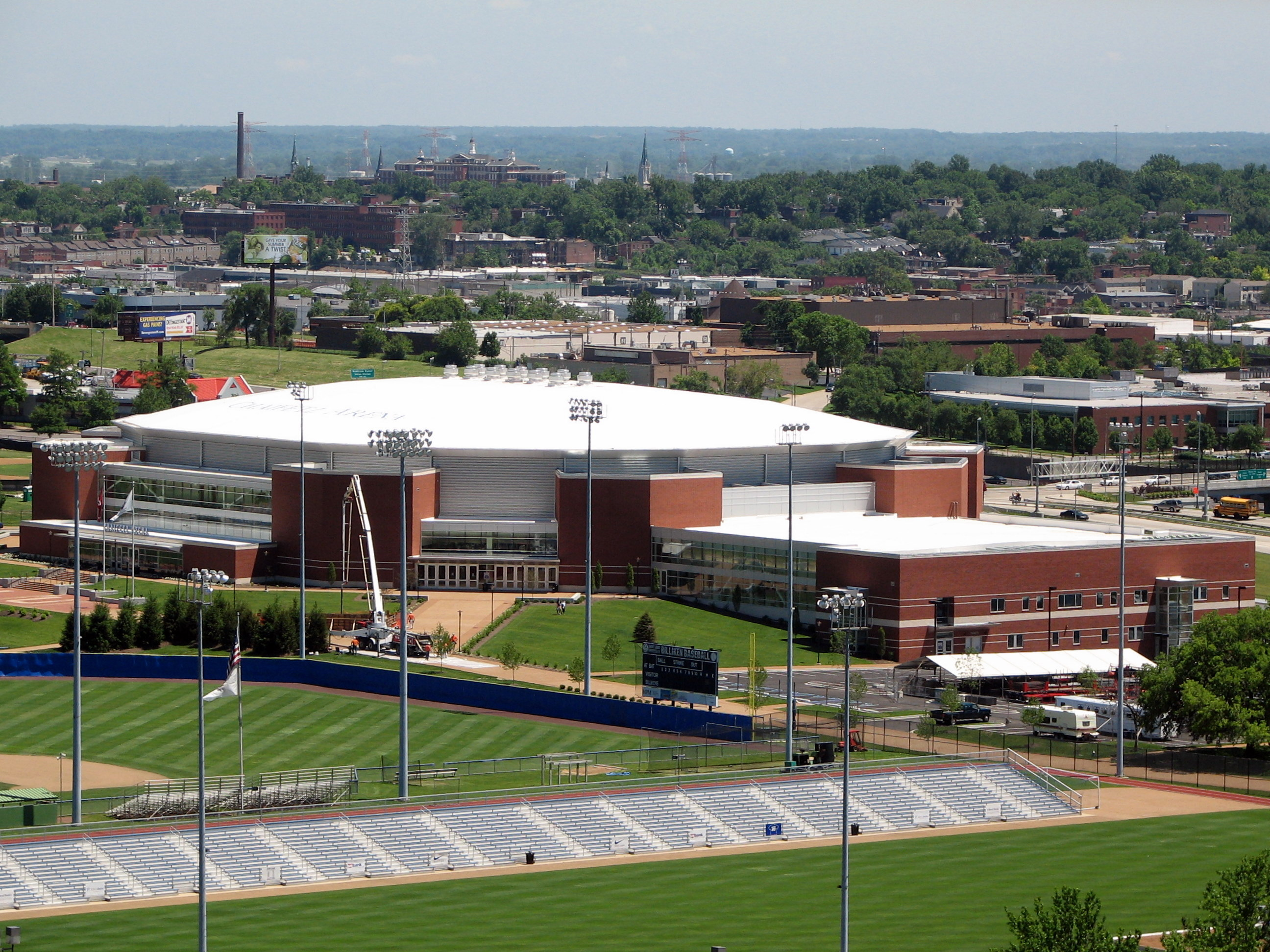
- Exterior view of the arena in 2008
- Interactive map of Chaifetz Arena
- Address: 1 South Compton Avenue
- Location: St. Louis, Missouri, U.S.
- Coordinates: 38.63246°N 90.22797°W
- Owner: Saint Louis University
- Operator: Spectra by Comcast Spectacor
- Capacity: 10,600
- Surface: Multi-surface
- Record attendance: 11,727 (Sabrina Carpenter; October 17, 2024)
- Public transit: MetroBus

Construction
- Groundbreaking: August 28, 2006
- Opened: April 10, 2008
- Cost: $80.5 million ($120 million in 2025 dollars)
- Architects: Sink Combs Dethlefs; Mackey Mitchell Associates
- Structural engineers: Alper Audi, Inc.
- General contractor: Clayco Construction

Tenants
- Saint Louis Billikens (NCAA teams: men's and women's basketball (2008–present)

Website
- chaifetzarena.com

Chaifetz Arena (/ˈʃeɪfɛts/ SHAY-fets), is a 10,600 seat multi-purpose arena in St. Louis, Missouri, located on the Saint Louis University campus. The arena began construction on August 28, 2006, and opened on April 10, 2008.

In February 2007, Chicago-based businessman Richard Chaifetz, CEO of ComPsych Corporation and 1975 graduate of SLU, made a $12 million donation to the university, which named the arena in his honor.

Since the 2008–09 season, it has been the home of the Saint Louis University men's and women's basketball teams. Additionally, the attached Chaifetz Pavilion includes a two-court basketball and volleyball practice facility that also serves as an 800-seat venue that is the home for the university's volleyball teams. The arena, known as "the Jewel of Midtown," includes a three-story athletic office. Former VCU coach Shaka Smart called Chaifetz Arena the toughest venue to play in the Atlantic 10 Conference.

== Record attendances ==
Men's basketball records at Chaifetz Arena:

Year	Conference record	Overall	Win.%	Head coach	Att.
2008–2009	6–2	14–3	.824	Rick Majerus	7,627
2009–2010	6–2	18–4	.818	Rick Majerus	7,149
2010–2011	4–4	9–7	.563	Rick Majerus	6,299
2011–2012	7–1	15–1	.938	Rick Majerus	7,757
2012–2013	7–1	17–2	.895	Jim Crews	7,673
2013–2014	6–2	14–3	.824	Jim Crews	8,428
2014–2015	3–6	9–9	.500	Jim Crews	7,032
2015–2016	3–6	7–11	.389	Jim Crews	6,757
2016–2017	5–4	10–8	.556	Travis Ford	5,593
2017–2018	6–3	12–6	.667	Travis Ford	6,235
2018–2019	7–2	15–2	.882	Travis Ford	6,890
2019–2020	7–2	15–3	.833	Travis Ford	6,880
2020–2021	5–1	12–1	.923	Travis Ford	
2021–2022	8–1	14–5	.737	Travis Ford	5,517
2022–2023	8–1	15–3	.833	Travis Ford	7,088
2023–2024	2–7	8–8	.500	Travis Ford	5,640
2024–2025	7−2	14−3	.824	Josh Schertz	5,966
TOTALS	97–47	218–79	.734		

== Events ==
The first event held at the venue was a Harlem Globetrotters game against the Washington Generals, played on April 11, 2008.

Music acts such as Barry Manilow, Bruce Springsteen, Britney Spears, Tool, Taylor Swift, Adele and Sabrina Carpenter have performed at the arena; the lattermost breaking the attendance record with a crowd of 11,727.

The first student concert was held on April 26, 2008, featuring artists Tyler Hilton, Chingy, The Starting Line, Jo Dee Messina, and Augustana.

Saint Louis University held its first commencement ceremony on campus in 60 years at the arena on May 17, 2008. Fox Sports personality and native St. Louisan Joe Buck delivered the Commencement Address.

The first political rally at the Arena was on October 2, 2008, for Republican vice presidential candidate Sarah Palin. She appeared to supporters after the 2008 vice presidential debate held at Washington University in St. Louis.

FIRST Robotics Competition has held its St. Louis FRC Regional at Chaifetz Arena for several years.

American Idols Live! made its Chaifetz Arena debut in 2009, having previously been held at the Enterprise Center (2002) and Family Arena (2003–2008). Chaifetz Arena also became the St. Louis stop for Champions on Ice and Cirque du Soleil, also in 2009.

The arena hosted the Monster Truck Spectacular Fall Nationals on October 17, 2009.

The USA Gymnastics Championships occurred June 7–10, 2012 at the Chaifetz Arena.

TNA No Surrender took place at the arena on September 12, 2013,

The 2016 Men's U.S. Olympic Trials and P&G Gymnastics Championships were held at Chaifetz Arena June 23–26, 2016. The 2018 SEC Gymnastics championships were held at the arena.

WWE held its first show there on July 21, 2018.

League of Legends North American LCS spring finals was held on April 13, 2019, at the Chaifetz Arena.

Professional wrestling promotion All Elite Wrestling held an episode of their weekly television show AEW Rampage at the arena on November 5, 2021. On January 20, 2024, AEW held an episode of their weekly television show AEW Collision. On April 21, 2024, All Elite Wrestling held Dynasty at the arena. On October 18, 2025, AEW returned to the arena for their PPV event WrestleDream.

Tim McGraw performed a benefit concert at Chaifetz Arena on April 29, 2023. Proceeds from the show went to benefit Cardinal Glennon Children's Hospital in St. Louis. The show was sold out. The Zac Brown Band performed on April 6, 2024 for Cardinal Glennon.

On June 13, 2026, Real American Freestyle will present RAF 10 at the venue, an event that will be broadcast live on Fox Nation.
