= Michael G. Brandt =

United States Air Force general

Michael G. Brandt is a former brigadier general and commander of the Missouri Air National Guard.

== Career ==
Brandt originally joined the United States Air Force in 1970 and underwent training at Lackland Air Force Base, Laughlin Air Force Base and George Air Force Base. In 1972, he was stationed at Homestead Air Force Base. The following year, Brandt was assigned duty in Iceland. He remained there until 1975, when he returned to George Air Force Base as an instructor pilot. Aside from a brief time at Luke Air Force Base followed by Nellis Air Force Base, Brandt was stationed there until 1978.

From 1978 to 1979, Brandt was a weapons officer at Kunsan Air Base in South Korea. Afterwards, he returned to Nellis Air Force Base as a fighter weapons instructor.

Brandt transferred to the Missouri Air National Guard in 1980. He served as commander from 1992 to 1996. Later, he became operations group commander, vice commander, wing commander, and chief of staff.

Awards he received during his career include the Legion of Merit, the Meritorious Service Medal, the Air Medal, the Air Force Commendation Medal, the Air Force Achievement Medal, the Joint Meritorious Unit Award, the Air Force Outstanding Unit Award, the Combat Readiness Medal, the National Defense Service Medal, the Armed Forces Expeditionary Medal, the Vietnam Service Medal, the Global War on Terrorism Service Medal, the Armed Forces Service Medal, the Air Force Overseas Short Tour Service Ribbon, the Air Force Longevity Service Award, the Armed Forces Reserve Medal, the Air Force Training Ribbon, the Vietnam Gallantry Cross and the Vietnam Campaign Medal.

== Education ==
- Saint Louis University
- Squadron Officer School
- Air War College
