= Richard A. Chaifetz School of Business =

Business school of Saint Louis University

Saint Louis University Richard A. Chaifetz School of Business
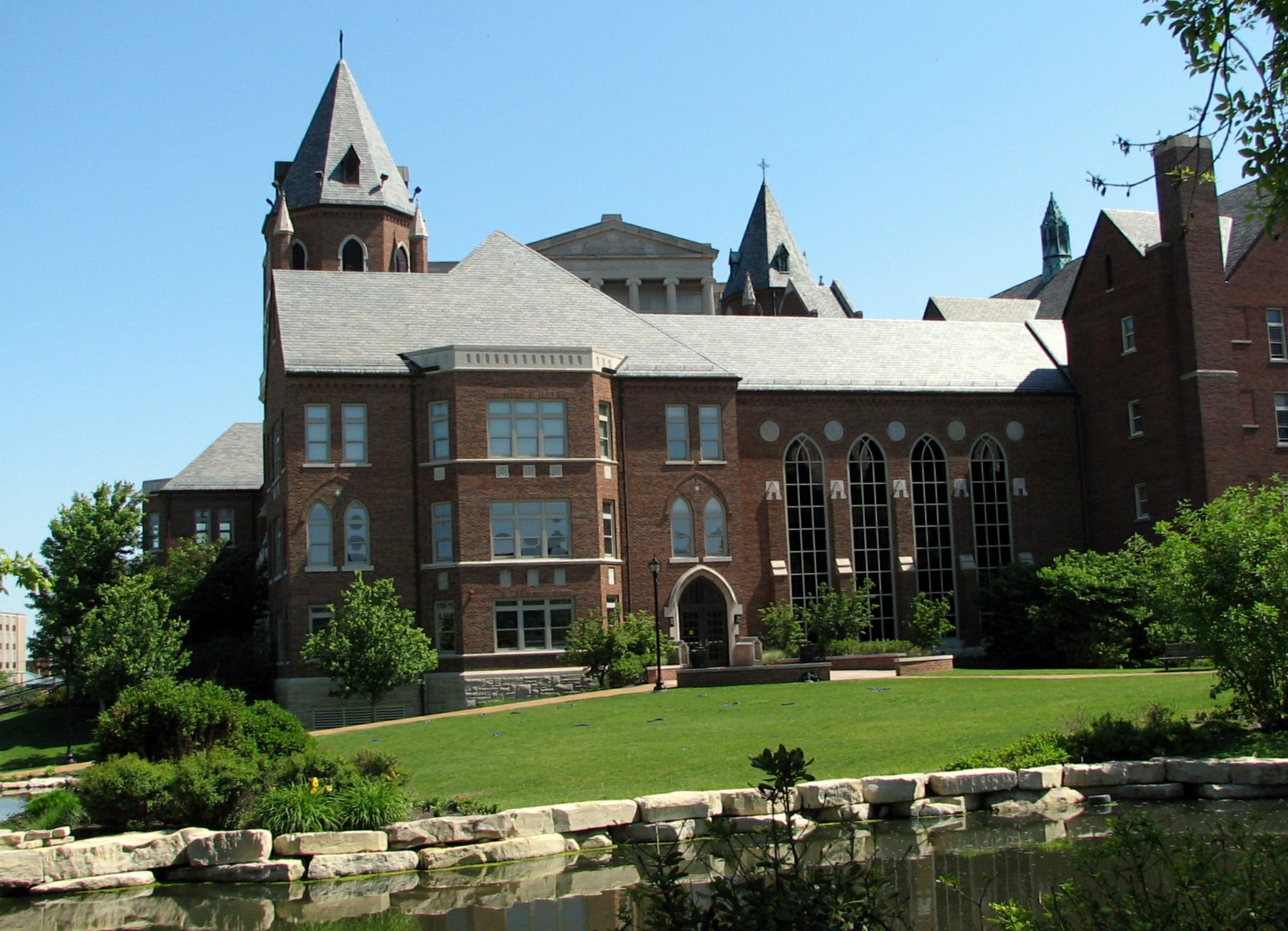
- Richard A. Chaifetz School of Business, seen from the central mall.
- Type: Private
- Established: 1910
- Parent institution: St. Louis University
- Dean: Jackson Nickerson, Ph.D.
- Students: 1700+
- Location: Midtown, St. Louis, Missouri, U.S. 38°38′15″N 90°14′09″W
- Campus: Urban
- Website: business.slu.edu

Richard A. Chaifetz School of Business is an American business school that is part of Saint Louis University, a Jesuit, Catholic university located in St. Louis, Missouri.

It is named after Richard Chaifetz, chairman and C.E.O. of ComPsych Corp., following his $27 million gift to the university. By 2009, the school's Richard A. Chaifetz Center for Entrepreneurship ranked in the Top 10 and, and in 2010, was ranked "Top 5 for Entrepreneurs" by Fortune (magazine). The school's undergraduate business program ranked #71 in the US according to U.S. News & World Report. In 2019, four of the school's graduate programs were internationally ranked, including Entrepreneurship (No. 12), International Business (No. 13), Supply Chain Management (No. 15), and Accounting (No. 28).

As of 2010, the student body included more than 1,700 undergraduates and graduates.

== History ==
The business school was founded in 1910. The Richard A. Chaifetz School of Business undergraduate and graduate programs are accredited by AACSB International—the Association to Advance Collegiate Schools of Business, the premier accrediting agency for degree programs in business—in which it earned accreditation in 1948. Less than 5% of business schools worldwide have earned accreditation.

== Building ==
In 2000, the business school opened John and Lucy Cook Hall. The building is large and houses a 280-seat auditorium. The school is home to the Boeing Institute of International Business, U.S. Bank Advancing Women in Leadership Program, Emerson Ethics Center, Smurfit-Stone Center for Entrepreneurship, Simon Center for Regional Economic Forecasting & Center for Supply Chain Management.

== Academics ==
=== Undergraduate programs ===
Through a comprehensive curriculum including studies in Arts & Science, all business disciplines, as well as advanced courses in a specific concentration.

=== Graduate programs ===
The Richard A. Chaifetz School of Business offers five graduate business programs. Additionally, graduates have the option of pursuing joint degrees. MBA dual degrees are offered with the Law School and the Medical School.

=== Executive Education ===
The school offers a variety of executive education programs, namely the Executive Masters of International Business [EMIB] program. It is a 21-month program in which students are exposed to several areas of business coursework.

=== Certification in Ethics and Compliance Management ===
As of 2012, the business school offers a certification program in ethics and compliance management. Successful completion of the course and final exam will result in the Certified in Ethics and Compliance Management (CECM) credential.

=== Center for Supply Chain Management Studies ===
The center is dedicated to supply chain management education and workshops and affiliated with leading companies and organizations such as NCMA, APICS, CSCMP to name a few.

== Rankings ==
Business school rankings

U.S. MBA Rankings
- Bloomberg (2025): NC (full-time); 32 (part-time)
- U.S. News & World Report (2026): 81 (full-time); 37 (part-time)

The MBA program at SLU's Richard A. Chaifetz School of Business climbed from #94 in 2012 to #81 in 2013 as published by U.S. News. U.S. News has also ranked the Richard A. Chaifetz School of Business' Entrepreneurship, International Business, and Supply Chain Management programs in the top 20, and its undergraduate program among the top 100 in the United States. Specifically, in 2012, U.S. News has ranked SLU's MBA in entrepreneurship at No. 13 in the nation, and SLU's undergraduate entrepreneurship program at No. 13, while its Entrepreneurship program has also been ranked highly by Entrepreneur Magazine. Fortune ranked SLU's entrepreneurship program as one of the "Top 5 for Entrepreneurs" in 2010.

The Part-Time MBA Program was ranked by U.S. News at No. 14 in the nation in 2012, but fell to No. 37 in 2013. Bloomberg Businessweek ranks SLU's Richard A. Chaifetz School of Business Part-time MBA at #5 in the Midwest.
