= Ugly American =

Ugly American or similar may refer to:

- The Ugly American, a 1958 novel by William Lederer and Eugene Burdick
- The Ugly American (film), a 1963 film starring Marlon Brando, based on the 1958 novel
- Ugly American (pejorative), a term used to refer to perceptions of arrogant behavior by Americans abroad
- Ugly Americans (band), an American rock band
- The Ugly American (album), a 2002 album by Marc Eitzel
- Ugly Americans (book), a 2004 book by Ben Mezrich
- Ugly Americans (TV series), a 2010 television series
