= Thomas Anthony Dooley III =

American physician (1927–1961)

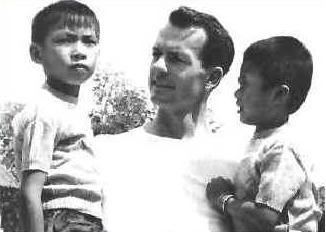
- Thomas A. Dooley, M.D.
- Born: January 17, 1927; St. Louis, Missouri, U.S.
- Died: January 18, 1961 (aged 34); New York City, New York, U.S.
- Education: University of Notre Dame
- Occupations: Physician, author

Thomas Anthony Dooley III (January 17, 1927 – January 18, 1961) was an American physician who worked in Southeast Asia at the outset of American involvement in the Vietnam War. While serving as a physician in the United States Navy and afterwards, he became known for his humanitarian and anti-communist political activities up until his early death from cancer. After his death, the public learned that he had been recruited as an intelligence operative by the Central Intelligence Agency, and numerous descriptions of atrocities by the Viet Minh in his book Deliver Us From Evil had been fabricated.

Dooley has been called "a key agent in the first disinformation campaign of the Vietnam War," garnering support for the US government's growing involvement there. Dooley, one critic said, is an example of "celebrity sainthood" and the "intersection of show business and mysticism occupied the space where Tom Dooley was perhaps most at home"; nevertheless, he "helped to pull American Catholicism away from its insular, angry anti-Communism" and he lived a life that does not "invite facile judgment."

Dooley authored three popular books that described his activities in Vietnam and Laos: Deliver Us From Evil, The Edge of Tomorrow, and The Night They Burned the Mountain.

== Early life ==
Dooley was born January 17, 1927, in St. Louis, Missouri, and raised in a prominent Roman Catholic Irish-American household. He attended St. Roch Catholic Elementary School and St. Louis University High School; at both he was a classmate of Michael Harrington. He then went to college at the University of Notre Dame, but completed only five semesters of course work. In 1944, he enlisted as a hospital corpsman in the United States Navy, serving in a naval hospital in New York City. In 1946, he returned to Notre Dame, but left without receiving a degree. Later, on June 5, 1960, Notre Dame presented him with an honorary degree. He entered the Saint Louis University School of Medicine. When he graduated in 1953, after repeating his final year of medical school, he joined the Navy. He completed his residency at Marine Corps Base Camp Pendleton, California, and then at Yokosuka, Japan. In 1954, he was assigned to the USS Montague, which was traveling to Vietnam.

== Humanitarian, author, and intelligence operative ==
In May 1954, the Geneva Agreements divided Vietnam at the 17th parallel north into two political zones. People north of the 17th parallel lived under the Viet Minh government, and those south of the 17th parallel lived under the government of Ngo Dinh Diem. Hanoi and Haiphong remained free zones until May 1955. In August 1954, Dooley transferred to Task Force Ninety, a unit participating in the evacuation of over 600,000 North Vietnamese known as Operation Passage to Freedom. Here he served as a French interpreter and medical officer for a Preventive Medicine Unit in Haiphong. He eventually oversaw the building and maintenance of refugee camps in Haiphong until May 1955, when the Viet Minh took over the city. He returned to Yokosuka, Japan in June 1955.

=== CIA recruitment and Deliver Us From Evil ===
Dooley was assigned to the medical intelligence task force sponsored by the Military Advisory Assistance Group, whose leader, Lt. Gen. John W. O'Daniel, was an active ally of Ngo Dinh Diem. His official duties involved collecting samples for epidemiological work, "but his primary role was as a liaison between the refugee campaign...Operation Passage to Freedom and American reporters and politicians with an interest in Southeast Asia." In return for his work as a "spokesman", the doctor was awarded the highest presidential honor by Diem. During this period, he wrote numerous letters to his mother, many of which she shared with reporters; the letters were then printed in the local press, including the St. Louis Globe-Democrat. Most of the letters exaggerated his personal contribution to the refugee work. Despite his self-promotion, he "was indefatigable in taking care of his patients." Concerning the "self-aggrandizement" aspect of his personality, he said that to be a humanitarian in the modern world "you've gotta run it like a business. You've gotta have Madison Avenue, press relations, TV, radio...and of course you get condemned for being a publicity seeker;" he argued that being able to care for 100 people per day, between 1954 and 1958, with MEDICO later treating 2,000 per day, justified this approach to humanitarianism.

Dooley was soon recruited as an operative by Lieutenant Colonel Edward G. Lansdale, head of the CIA office in Saigon. He was chosen as a symbol of Vietnamese-American cooperation, and was encouraged to write about his experiences in the refugee camps. The CIA, USAID, and several other agencies "conducted fund-raising campaigns for the refugees" later described in his books. The Pentagon Papers would later note that he "significantly aided" in the gathering of intelligence information.

William Lederer, author of The Ugly American, helped initiate this phase of Dooley's career. Lederer, who was at the time serving as a Navy press officer attached to the admiralty, appreciated the eloquence of Dooley's situation reports, and suggested that he write a book. Immediately prior to publication, he and Lederer spent two weeks living together polishing the manuscript. Lederer was also on "special assignment" for the CIA during this period.

In 1956, Dooley's book Deliver Us from Evil became a best-seller, establishing him as an icon of American humanitarian and anti-communist activities abroad. His vivid accounts of communist atrocities committed on Catholic refugees were not verifiable. It has been alleged that Dooley was passing along descriptions of events that had been created by Landsdale and his team. In 1956, U.S. officials who were stationed in the Hanoi-Haiphong area during his tour of duty submitted a lengthy report to the U.S. Information Agency holding that Deliver Us from Evil was "not the truth" and that the accounts of Viet Minh atrocities were "nonfactual and exaggerated." However, these reports remained classified for nearly thirty years. James Fisher allows that the U.S. Information Agency report was "valid," but he also argues it "must be viewed with some suspicion" because they were preparing to "discredit Dooley" as "an insurance policy against a renewed outbreak of anti-internationalism."

Dooley's book featured exceptionally gory tales of religious persecution. The doctor claimed the Viet Minh jammed chopsticks into the ears of children to keep them from hearing the Lord's Prayer and regularly mutilated Catholic instructors. Most sensationally, he fabricated a story of the Viet Minh pounding nails into the head of a priest—"a communist version of the crown of thorns, once forced on the Savior of whom he preached." He also claimed that Ho Chi Minh's forces had "disemboweled more than 1,000 native women in Hanoi." Thirty years after his death, in response to a journalist's question, Lederer said that "the atrocities the doctor described 'never took place." At the time, however, Lederer brokered a deal with Reader's Digest to publish Dooley's claims and he used him as the "real-life model" for Father John Finian, a heroic character in The Ugly American. Critics noted the book's ability to describe horror and suffering, but one noted that "His book is less happy when he attempts to fill in the historical background." Dooley's grasp of the geo-political situation was superficial.

Commenting on these allegations, Seth Jacobs wrote that although Dooley "may have exaggerated or fabricated," this was not done to make his book more sensational. Instead, these atrocity stories grew out of a period of immersion in refugee life, from September 1954 to May 1955, a period during which he drove himself so mercilessly that he went from 180 to 120 pounds, "nearly died of malarial fever, acquired four types of intestinal worms, and suffered so acutely from sleep deprivation that he frequently hallucinated." Whereas Dooley had previously avoided responsibility, now "he could not get enough of it": he regularly performed major surgery and lobbied pharmaceutical companies.

=== Naval discharge and Laotian activities ===
Dooley was on a promotional tour for this book when he was investigated for participating in homosexual activities. It seems that what the Navy discovered about his private life resulted in a negotiated agreement that he would announce he was leaving the Navy in order to serve the people of Vietnam.

After leaving the Navy, Dooley and three former Navy corpsmen established a hospital near Luang Namtha, Laos, with the sponsorship of the International Rescue Committee. At this time, the International Rescue Committee had a secret working relationship with the CIA in Southeast Asia, coordinated by Joseph Buttinger. In an article entitled "Why I'm A Jungle Medic," printed in Think magazine, June 1958, he said they chose Laos because the country, with 3,000,000 people, had only one "bonafide" doctor. He explained to the Laotian Minister of Health that he wished to work in an area near the Chinese border because "there are sick people there and furthermore people who had been flooded with potent draughts of anti-Western propaganda from Red China."

Dooley founded the Medical International Cooperation Organization (MEDICO) under the auspices of which he built hospitals at Nam Tha, Muong Sing (five miles south of the Chinese border), and Ban Houei Sa. The plan for MEDICO was that it would build, stock, supply, and train staff for small hospitals; after 16 months, MEDICO planned to turn over these hospitals to the host country's government. During this same time period, he wrote two books, The Edge of Tomorrow and The Night They Burned the Mountain, about his experience in Laos, including further descriptions of atrocities he said were committed by communist soldiers. In the latter book, he voiced strong political opinions about the Laotian crisis of 1960, defending the right-wing coup led by "one of his closest friends," Phoumi Nosavan. He also wrote that the rigging of elections "cut through the red tape and kibbosh you get involved with in Asia," asserting that "Democracy, as championed in the US, does not translate well into Lao...Not yet."

While Dooley was providing medical care to Lao refugees, he also collected intelligence for the CIA, tracking civilian movements, and he provided cover for United States Special Forces medics who posed as civilian doctors. Dennis Shephard, a physician who worked with him, claimed that he would round up as many of his former patients as he could whenever potential sponsors came to tour the Vientiane clinic, giving the impression that he had a full and active clinic. Shephard remembered local CIA officers coming by often to find out if Dooley had picked up anything about the movement of Chinese troops, as well as to ensure that the weapons he had brought up with his medical supplies were well-hidden and secure. Shephard helped him establish a clinic at Vang Vieng; His obituary records that he was a guest when he was featured on This Is Your Life and that he traveled with him "from village to village, where they treated illness and injuries, and taught Laotians about sanitation and medication."

=== Televised cancer surgery, death, and Peace Corps ===
In 1959, Dooley returned to the United States for cancer treatment. He agreed to Fred W. Friendly's request that his melanoma surgery be the subject of a CBS News documentary. On April 21, 1960, Biography of a Cancer was broadcast; it was hosted by Howard K. Smith, and included the surgery and an interview with him. In response to Smith's suggestion that his attitude toward his cancer was "blithe", he replied: "I'm scared to death of this thing becoming maudlin; I'm scared to death of somebody saying 'a clutching, agonizing sort of a thing'...I don't want anyone to get sloppy over this; I don't like anything that says 'a dying doctor's anguish bit'; that's stupid." He proceeded to say that he agreed to the televising of his surgery to help reduce American ignorance and fear of cancer, and so that he could promote MEDICO. After the surgery was performed, he described it candidly and revealed that his prognosis was bad; he died less than a year later.

According to James Fisher's comprehensive biography, Dooley remained a devout Catholic until his death. At his funeral, U.S. Sen. Stuart Symington described him as "One of those rare Americans who is truly a citizen of the world." After his death, John F. Kennedy cited his example when he launched the Peace Corps. He was also awarded a Congressional Gold Medal after his death. He was buried in Calvary Cemetery in St. Louis.

== Importance and legacy ==
In 1961 Gallup Poll named Dooley the third most admired man in the world according to the American public, behind only President Dwight D. Eisenhower and Pope John XXIII. Later, his legacy became intertwined with controversy surrounding the Vietnam War. As a result, writers continue to struggle with the doctor's record of philanthropy and the later American war in Southeast Asia.

During the height of the Vietnam War, when attention began to be given to the propaganda aspect of Dooley's work, one journalist charged that he was responsible "for helping to create 'a climate of public misunderstanding that made the war in Vietnam possible.'" More than a decade later, after examining more than 500 unclassified CIA documents, another writer argued that although he did provide the CIA with some information, he never initiated contact with them, he took no money, his motivation was patriotism, and he hoped this would afford him "more freedom to do his work and a little less harassment."

Despite Dooley's problematic descriptions of Southeast Asia, Prince Souphan of Laos said that he was "known to his grateful Lao admirers as 'Thanh Mo America' (Dr. America)". He himself was frequently critical of United States actions in the region. He observed: "We are hated in most of the Orient. ... They think freedom means freedom of the capitalist to exploit the Oriental people. No Americans have ever gotten down to their level." At the same time, he opposed concrete reforms to foreign aid in Laos when Congress proposed them, defending the "first-class administrators" at the US embassy. He also rejected all compromises with communists, even when the Laotian public supported them, going so far as calling the popular neutralist leader Kong Le "an idiot."

MEDICO depended primarily upon volunteers and private donations; by 1960 over 2000 physicians had applied to serve as volunteers, and new teams for medical assistance were established in Haiti, Cambodia, and Afghanistan. According to Ted Hesburgh, Dooley refused Dwight D. Eisenhower's offer to use government funds to assist in his work. Eisenhower did, however, personally raise funds for MEDICO. After Dooley died, funding for MEDICO dried up and it was taken over by CARE.

Dooley's principal biographer, James Fisher, wrote that he "tried never to forget what this man's toil and suffering meant to untold people of all backgrounds." Nearly four years after his death, The New York Times wrote that his work was "more active than it was even at the time of his death." Although medical experts criticized his approach as naive and simplistic, numerous people have been inspired by Dooley to do similar work:

- Verne Chaney, a surgeon who worked with him, founded the Dooley Intermed International – Medical Aid Around the World, an organization that provides medical equipment, supplies, personnel and financial support for the improvement of health services in underdeveloped countries.
- Betty Tisdale, who met him and was inspired by his work, founded H.A.L.O. (Helping And Loving Orphans). Just prior to the fall of Vietnam, she orchestrated the evacuation and adoption of 219 Vietnamese orphans to homes in the US. Betty Tisdale and H.A.L.O. continue his work not only in Vietnam, but also in other countries.
- Teresa Gallagher, a volunteer who worked with him, along with his brother, Malcolm, established The Dr. Tom Dooley Foundation that is dedicated to delivering medical care to people of the Third World. Dr. Jerry Brown, a 2013 graduate of an affiliated program in Cameroon was among the "Ebola Fighters" named as the Time Person of the Year for 2014.
- Davida Coady, an activist pediatrician, who was also inspired by Dooley, devoted herself to caring for impoverished people in Africa, Central America, Asia; she was involved in the famine relief efforts in Biafra, the hunting down of the last smallpox cases in India, and the rebuilding of medical infrastructure in Nicaragua.

The Dr. Tom Dooley Foundation has an endowed scholarship at the St. Louis University Medical School intended "to inspire students to follow the footsteps of Dr. Tom Dooley." Dooley is memorialized at the University of Notre Dame's Grotto of Our Lady, with a statue as well as an engraved copy of a letter he wrote to former Notre Dame president Ted Hesburgh.

== Decorations ==
- Congressional Gold Medal: On May 27, 1961, Congress authorized the issuance of a gold medal to honor Dooley and his work. President John F. Kennedy presented the medal to Dooley's mother, Agnes Dooley, in a White House ceremony on June 7, 1962. Kennedy commended him for providing a model of American compassion before the rest of the world.
- Legion of Merit
- National Order of Vietnam, 4th Class (Degree of Officer)
- The Saint Francis Xavier Medal: Distinguished achievement award of Xavier University
- Key to the City of Mishawaka, Indiana
- Rotary Club of Hong Kong Pennant
- Key to the City of South Bend, Indiana
- Key to the City of Baltimore, Maryland
- Key to the City of Worcester
- Christopher Award: 1956
- Christopher Award: 1961
- Mutual of Omaha-Criss Award: At the 1959 awards dinner in Omaha, the speakers were General James Doolittle, Fred Astaire, and Charles Mayo, son of one of the founders of the Mayo Clinic. The awards ceremony was televised nationally by ABC and Dooley received $10,000.
- Franklin D. Roosevelt Award: awarded by Midwood High
- Seal of Boston College, 4th Class (Degree of Officer)
- Canisius College - Medal of Honor: 1961
- St. Louis College of Pharmacy & Allied Sciences
- Notre Dame Alumni Assoc. Distinguished Service Award
- Claude Bernard Medal
- The City of New York Medal: 1960
- Barat Hall - Man of the Year Award: 1970
- The Religious Heritage of America, Inc., Churchman of the Year: 1960
- Tulsa Jr. Chamber of Commerce Appreciation Certificate
- Legion of Merit Citation
- St. Louis Medical Society Honorary Membership
- The Chesterton Club: Youngstown, Ohio, Honorary Membership
- Dr. Dooley Day Proclamation, St. Louis, Missouri: 1959
- Honorary Degree of Doctor of Science, University of Notre Dame, Indiana - 1960
- Honorary Degree of Doctor of Science, Loyola University: 1959
- Honorary Citizen Award; Nashville, Tennessee: 1959
- Good Shipmate Certificate USS Montague: August, 1954
- Honorary Membership, St. Louis Jr. Chamber of Commerce: 1958
- Honorary Citizen Award, Fort Worth, Texas: 1958
- Catholic Physicians' Guild of Pittsburgh Recognition Award, 4th Class (Degree of Officer)
- Honorary Citizen Award, Lubbock, Texas: 1958
- Lincoln, Indiana, Meritorious Service Citation: 1961
- Jr. Chamber International Senate Membership: 1960
- Jr. Chinese Catholic Club of Honolulu Honorary Membership: 1958
- National Order of Viet-Nam Conferral, Deptartment of Navy: 1960
- United States Navy; Honorable Discharge: 1956
- Allegheny County Council of AMVETS; Award: 1957
- St. Louis University; Honor Citation: 1959
- TWA Ambassadors Club Membership Certificate: 1959
- AMVETS; Certificate of Merit
- City of Worcester; Recognition Certificate: October 26, 1959
- National Press Club Certificate of Appreciation, Washington, D.C.: 1960

== Media appearances ==
- On November 22, 1959, Dooley was a guest on the long-running television program, What's My Line? where he was presented with a $5,000 check by host John Daly on behalf of the Damon Runyon Foundation to support his work in Laos.
- Dooley was also a guest on Jack Paar's The Tonight Show, Ralph Edwards' This Is Your Life, and Arthur Godfrey's radio show.
- From 1959-1960, he hosted a weekly, Sunday night radio program, That Free Men May Live, for KMOX.
- Dooley was profiled by Time magazine, Life magazine, and Look magazine.
- In about 1959, Dooley was a guest on the Irv Kupcinet Interview Show broadcast in Chicago.

== Publications ==
- Dooley, Thomas A., Deliver Us from Evil: The Story of Vietnam's Flight to Freedom (New York : Farrar, Straus and Cudahy, 1956).
- Dooley, Thomas A., The Edge of Tomorrow (New York, New York : New American Library, 1958) ISBN 0-374-14648-9.
- Dooley, Thomas A., The Night They Burned the Mountain (New York : Farrar, Straus & Cudahy, 1960) ISBN 0-374-22212-6.

== See also ==
- Dr. America
- Sexual orientation and the United States military

== Sources ==
- Barber, Melanie Gordon, The third anniversary : anatomy and progress : in memory of Doctor Thomas Anthony Dooley, January 17, 1927-January 18, 1961 (Taconic, Connecticut : Bardon Press, 1965)
- Fisher, James T., Dr. America: The Lives of Thomas A. Dooley, 1927-1961 (Amherst : University of Massachusetts Press, 1997) ISBN 1-55849-067-1
- Gallagher, Teresa, Give joy to my youth; a memoir of Dr. Tom Dooley (New York, Farrar : Straus and Giroux, 1965)
- Monahan, James, Before I sleep; the last days of Dr. Tom Dooley (New York : Farrar, Straus and Cudahy, 1961)
- Selsor, Lucille, "Sincerely, Tom Dooley" (New York : Twin Circle, 1969)
- Shilts, Randy (1993). Conduct Unbecoming: Gays & Lesbians in the U.S. Military Vietnam to the Persian Gulf. New York, St. Martin's Press. ISBN 0-312-09261-X
- February 2000 Fisher, J.T. Dooley, Thomas Anthony, III. American National Biography Online
