= Sandra Church =

American actress and singer (born 1937)

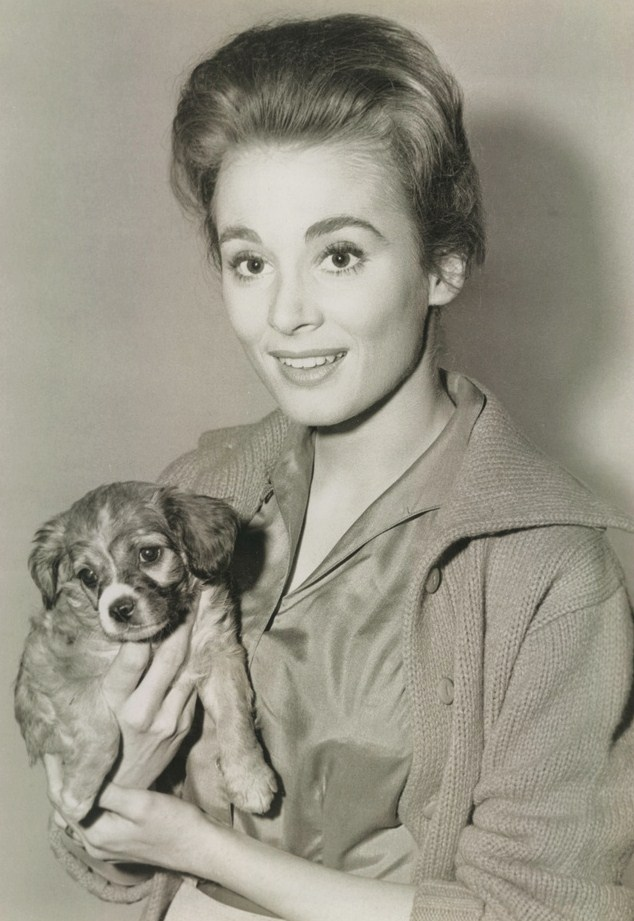
- Church in Eleventh Hour (1963)
- Born: January 13, 1937 (age 89); San Francisco, California, U.S.
- Occupations: Actress, singer, artist
- Years active: 1944–1964
- Known for: Gypsy
- Spouses: Norman Twain (m. 1964; div. 1975) Albert H. Clayburgh (m. 1992; died 1997)
- Relatives: Mary Florence Denton (great-aunt)

Sandra Church (born January 13, 1937) is an American actress and singer. She is best known for her performance as the original Gypsy Rose Lee in Gypsy (1959), for which she was nominated for a Tony Award for Best Featured Actress in a Musical. She also co-starred with Marlon Brando in The Ugly American (1963).

== Early years ==
Church was born in San Francisco. She was raised by her mother after her father's death before she was 2 years old. Outside of her work as a nurse, her mother focused on preparing Church for a career in entertainment, including dancing lessons beginning "almost as soon as I could walk". Church's childhood included abstaining from "anything sweet, heavy, or starchy" to eat, wearing high, laced shoes "to keep my ankles small", and wearing sunbonnets. Her hair was braided in long pigtails because her mother said they made a young girl more photogenic. Her physical activity was minimal to avoid the possibility of injury. She had to regularly practice tongue-twisters to improve her enunciation.

Church's education included classe at an acting school and at Immaculate Heart. She and her mother moved to Hollywood when Church was 5 because her mother "was certain that I was going to be a great big movie star." During her childhood her mother took her for screen tests, resulting in small parts in several films. With the help of Queenie Smith she replaced Janice Rule in Picnic, leaving Immaculate Heart during her junior year to take that role on Broadway.

== Career ==
=== Theatre ===
From 1953 to 1959, Church played various ingénue roles in theatrical plays. In 1953, Church made her Broadway debut in the role of Madge Owens, replacing Janice Rule, in William Inge's Picnic with Ralph Meeker. Her next performance was playing Sonya in Uncle Vanya (1956), an off-broadway production with Franchot Tone and Signe Hasso, followed by roles as Betsy Dean in Holiday for Lovers (1957) and Helen White in Winesburg, Ohio.

Church's breakout performance came in 1959 as the original Gypsy Rose Lee in Gypsy (1959), for which she was nominated for a Tony Award for Best Featured Actress in a Musical. In his autobiography, playwright Arthur Laurents states: "It came down to between Suzanne Pleshette and Sandra Church. Suzanne was the better actress, but Sandra was the better singer. We went with Sandra." In Gypsy, Church introduced the popular standard "Let Me Entertain You." Church obtained that role after five auditions. During the times between auditions she observed a performance by Tempest Storm, had a stripper teach her "the stripper's walk" and had a choreographer develop a routine for her.

Following Gypsy, Church appeared in the 1960 Broadway play Under the Yum Yum Tree, directed by Joseph Anthony.

=== Films and television ===
Church's first on-screen appearance was on the Producers' Showcase, followed by the role of Jeannie in The Mugger (1958). She subsequently guest starred on the television series Look Up And Live (1959), as well as The DuPont Show of the Month in 1960. Three years later, she played Marion MacWhite in the film adaptation of Eugene Burdick and William Lederer's novel, The Ugly American (1963). Also in 1963, she appeared on television in The Eleventh Hour and Kraft Suspense Theatre.

== Personal life ==
In October 1961 it was widely reported that Church and Gypsy composer Jule Styne would marry, although this was untrue. In November 1964, she married Broadway play producer Norman Twain in Bridgetown, Barbados at the home of stage designer Oliver Messel. She was married to Albert H. 'Bill' Clayburgh from 1992 until his death in 1997.

Church's great-aunt was educator Mary Florence Denton, a long-time faculty member at Doshisha University in Kyoto.

== Discography ==
Year	Title	Label
1959	Gypsy: A Musical Fable (Original Broadway Cast Recording)	Columbia Records
1959	Let Me Entertain You	Columbia Records
2011	Gypsy Meets Gypsy	Sepia Records
