= The Ugly American (film) =

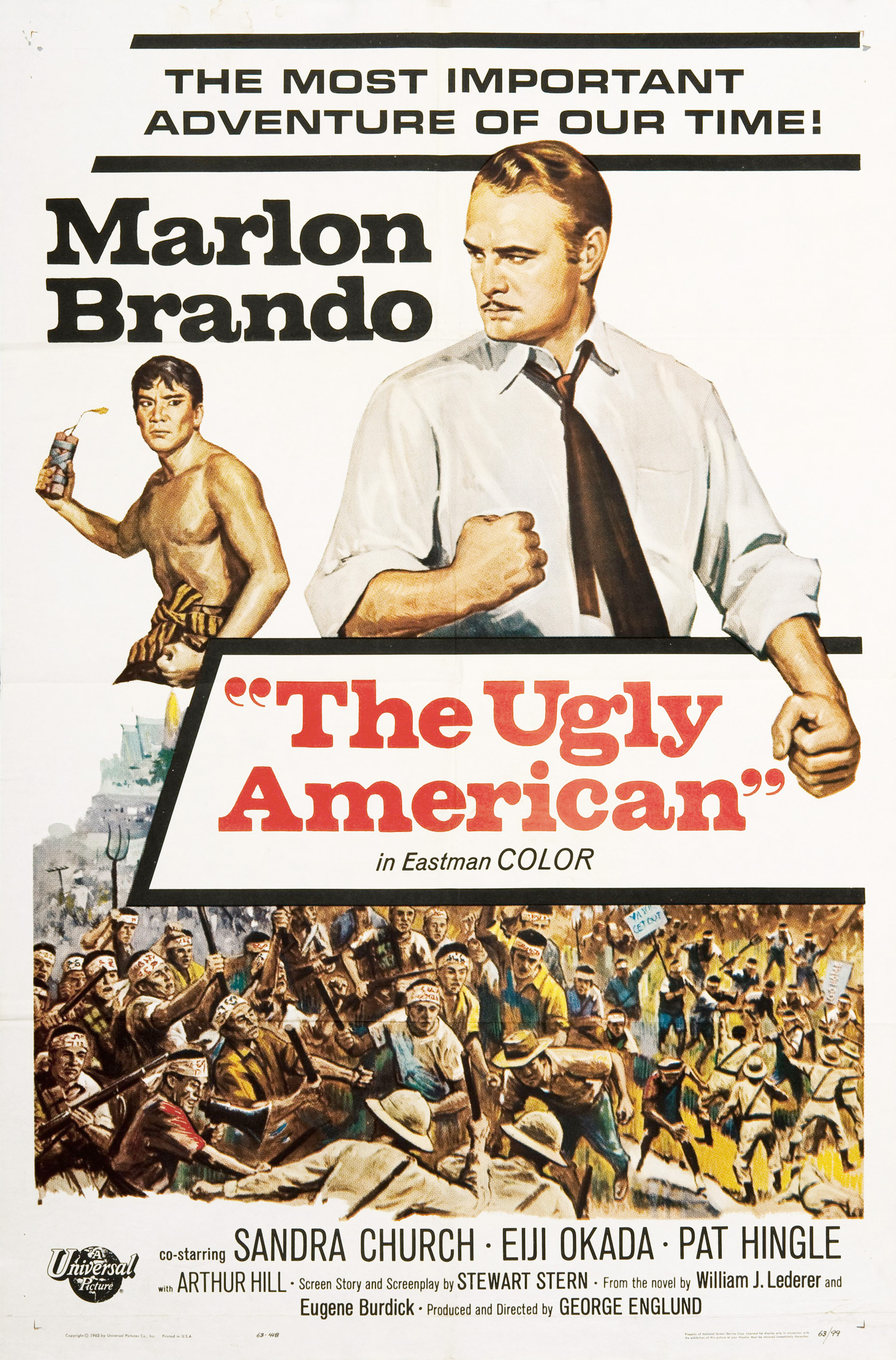
- Theatrical release poster by Renato Fratini
- Directed by: George Englund
- Screenplay by: Stewart Stern
- Based on: The Ugly American; 1958 novel by Eugene Burdick; William Lederer
- Produced by: George Englund
- Starring: Marlon Brando; Sandra Church; Eiji Okada; Pat Hingle; Judson Pratt; Reiko Sato; Arthur Hill
- Cinematography: Clifford Stine
- Edited by: Ted J. Kent
- Music by: Frank Skinner
- Distributed by: Universal-International
- Release date: April 2, 1963
- Running time: 120 minutes
- Country: United States
- Language: English
- Box office: $3,500,000

The Ugly American is a 1963 American political film directed by George Englund, written by Stewart Stern, and starring Marlon Brando, Sandra Church, Eiji Okada, Pat Hingle, Judson Pratt, Reiko Sato, and Arthur Hill. It is based on the 1958 novel The Ugly American by Eugene Burdick and William Lederer. The film was released on April 2, 1963, by Universal Pictures.

== Plot ==
The setting is the present day in Sarkhan, a fictional Southeast Asian country roiled by civil unrest and divided between the Communist North Sarkhan and South Sarkhan. Americans and Sarkhanese are building a "Freedom Road" in Sarkhan, which anti-American Sarkhanese view as an exercise in American imperialism of no value to the people. As the film begins, saboteurs murder a U.S. worker on the highway and send his truck plunging down an embankment, making it look as if he were drunk. A local worker is killed. One of the saboteurs rails against the death and ascribes it to American imperialism.

In Washington, hearings are held on a new American ambassador to Sarkhan. The nominee is Harrison MacWhite, a journalist and World War II veteran who had become acquainted with Sarkhan during the war. At the hearing, Senator Brenner grills MacWhite about his qualifications, including his links to Deong, an old friend of MacWhite he had met during the war. Deong has become Sarkhan's most prominent revolutionary leader. Brenner reads an article quoting Deong sounding hostile and anti-American; MacWhite says the quote is old and taken out of context and that he believes Deong is a man of honor.

When MacWhite and his wife arrive in Sarkhan, a mob of rebels swarms the airport and attacks his car, even using a wooden post as a battering ram, smashing it through the window close to his wife. The furious MacWhite asks why his staff didn't warn him about the danger and threatens to fire them if they fail again.

That night, MacWhite is pleased to reunite with Deong at his home. They get drunk together and discuss politics, leaving MacWhite disturbed. He drives around the city, thinking about it. When MacWhite returns to Deong's home late that night, the men fight bitterly over politics; MacWhite leaves believing Deong is a Communist.

MacWhite decides that the Freedom Road should be rerouted north to a more provocative location, close to the border with North Sarkhan. He convinces the Sarkhanese government to go along with this. Its prime minister reluctantly agrees, on condition that the U.S. Seventh Fleet intervene if necessary.

MacWhite and his wife travel to the countryside where they encounter Homer and Emma Atkins, a benevolent American couple running charity operations benefitting the people. Homer tells him that the Freedom Road the Americans are helping to build is seen by many Sarkhanese as an imperialist project. He says the planned rerouting of the road is a bad idea, and suggests it be routed instead to a hospital America could build to help the populace---but MacWhite insists on continuing the route north to the border with North Sarkhan.

Deong secretly visits Communist leaders―Soviet, Chinese, North Sarkhanese―in a forest, saying he'll consider their offers of arms and other aid. He demands that they eschew violence.

Rebel cadres led by Deong set off multiple explosions and engage in a gun battle with government troops, sabotaging the Freedom Road opening attended by Sarkhan's king and by MacWhite and his wife. The opening is a fiasco with many people killed. It is reported that there are also simultaneous, coordinated attacks across the country.

Parachutists from North Sarkhan land in Sarkhan, and indigenous Communist guerillas start executing local government leaders. Deong issues an ultimatum, demanding that the prime minister step down and accept him as the country's new leader. The prime minister asks MacWhite for American military intervention, and he proves to MacWhite (displaying as proof a captured Communist colonel who had been interrogated and tortured) that there is a Communist plot to assassinate Deong after Deong has seized power. He says that Deong has been betrayed; he is not a Communist but a "dupe". The prime minister is willing to form a coalition government with Deong, who is holding a vigil demanding the immediate ousting of the government.

MacWhite visits Deong in his headquarters and convinces him that the Communists plan to kill him. Deong expresses willingness in forming a coalition government with the prime minister, but he is then shot by his closest, trusted aide in front of MacWhite; as he dies, Deong tells a deputy to form a coalition government.

The Seventh Fleet intervenes. MacWhite realizes he misjudged Deong, was too simplistic and arrogant about his own beliefs, and had not credited Deong with the same drive for independence as held by America's own founders. MacWhite discusses this during a television address in an appeal to every American; as he is about to discuss what would be good American policy, an "average American" TV viewer turns off the address in mid-speech.

== Cast ==
- Marlon Brando as Ambassador Harrison Carter MacWhite
- Eiji Okada as Deong
- Sandra Church as Marion MacWhite
- Pat Hingle as Homer Atkins
- Arthur Hill as Grainger
- Jocelyn Brando as Emma Atkins
- Kukrit Pramoj as Prime Minister of Sarkhan
- Judson Pratt as Joe Bing
- Reiko Sato as Rachani, Deong's Wife
- George Shibata as Munsang
- Judson Laire as Senator Brenner
- Philip Ober as Ambassador Sears
- Yee Tak Yip as Sawad, Deong's Assistant
- Carl Benton Reid as Senator at Confirmation Hearing
- Simon Scott as Johnson
- Frances Helm as TadRed
- James Yegi as Berg
- John Daheim as Her (credited as John Day)
- Leon Lontoc as Lee Pang
- Bill Stout as Tyler, NBC Reporter
- Stefan Schnabel as Andrei Krupitzyn

== Production and screenplay ==
The film version of the novel was made in 1963 and starred Marlon Brando as Ambassador Harrison Carter MacWhite. Reiko Sato was cast as Rachani at the urging of Brando, who had dated her years prior.

The screenplay was written by Stewart Stern, and the film was produced and directed by George Englund. The film was shot mainly in Hollywood, with Thailand serving as the inspiration for the background sceneries. Parts of the film were also shot on locations in Bangkok, Thailand, including at Chulalongkorn University, one of the leading institutes of higher learning of the country.

In its review of the film, The New York Times stated that the film bore little resemblance to the novel upon which it is based.

== Critical reaction ==
The Ugly American received mixed reviews and was completely overwhelmed by a number of more popular films that year. The film won no Golden Globes and was not nominated for an Oscar. It did poorly at the box office and was not among the top 25 grossing films of 1963. The review aggregator Rotten Tomatoes gives the film an overall rating of 67% with a rating average of 6.1/10. Of twenty-three reviews examined by historian Jon Cowans, fourteen were positive, five negative, and four neutral or mixed.

The New York Times reported that Brando “moves through the whole picture with authority and intelligence,” and that he "comes through with an intricate and charming revelation of a decent, daring man who wants to be fair and constructive but is hobbled by his own naïveté." But the Times reviewer said that after a strong beginning it "subsides into some devious plot maneuvers that are just too corny, calculated and naïve."

The New York Daily News said it was “one of Brando’s best performances.” But the negative view was reflected by the critic in Time who wrote that Brando “attempts an important voice but most of the time he sounds like a small boy in a bathtub imitating Winston Churchill” and called it a “lousy picture.”

Only a few mentioned the point that, as The Dallas Morning News put it, one should “not assume that nationalism is inevitably anti-American,” and The New Republic was unusual in adding that “American blindness ... has driven many people particularly Asians, towards communism.” Some called Senator Brenner the real “ugly American” and objected to his McCarthyite tactics. The New York Post wrote that the film presented the dilemma that when Americans supported dictators, the Communists “make common revolutionary cause with the downtrodden.” Many East Coast reviews, however, objected to the film's “oversimplification” of the issues.

The Washington Post wrote it was “nothing more than a western about the bad guys and the good guys.” TV Guide in a review says 'Although well-intentioned, THE UGLY AMERICAN simply isn't a very good film. Part of the problem is that producer-director George Englund, a friend of star Brando, isn't much of a director, and as a result the film is static and ponderous. Brando once again turns in an interesting performance, but as demonstrated in many of his films of this period, one good performance does not a good film make'.

== Political impact ==
Kukrit Pramoj, a Thai politician and scholar, was hired as a cultural expert/advisor to the film and later played the role of Sarkhan's Prime Minister "Kwen Sai". Later on, in 1975, he, in fact, became the 13th Prime Minister of Thailand. Probably because of this, the word "Sarkhan" entered the Thai language as a nickname of Thailand itself, often with a slight self-deprecating or mocking tone. Much of the 'Sarkhanese' spoken in the film is actually Thai.
