= The Edge of Tomorrow =

The Edge of Tomorrow or Edge of Tomorrow may refer to:

- Edge of Tomorrow, originally All You Need Is Kill, a 2004 novel by Hiroshi Sakurazaka
  - Edge of Tomorrow, a 2014 science fiction film based on the book
- The Edge of Tomorrow (Asimov book), a 1985 collection by Isaac Asimov
- The Edge of Tomorrow (Dooley book), a 1958 book by Thomas A. Dooley
- Edge of Tomorrow, a fictional TV series in the sitcom Hot in Cleveland
- The Edge of Tomorrow, a 1961 short story collection by Howard Fast

== See also ==
- Edge of Tomorty: Rick Die Rickpeat, a 2019 episode of the television series Rick and Morty
