= Edward Maisel =

- Born: August 16, 1917; Buffalo, New York, United States
- Died: March 21, 2008 (aged 90)
- Occupation: Writer

Edward Maisel (August 16, 1917, Buffalo, New York – March 21, 2008) was an internationally known writer on music and tai chi.

He went to Harvard University where he graduated magna cum laude; he was also Phi Beta Kappa. He lived in New York City for most of his life.

He wrote Charles T. Griffes: the Life of an American Composer, the first definitive and still influential biography of this major early American composer. The CD The Songs of Charles T. Griffes was produced by Maisel. The Kennedy Center's Terrace Theater presented Maisel's production of Griffes' final but unfinished masterpiece Salut au Monde.

Maisel wrote the classic Yang form of tai chi using the title Tai Chi for Health. The book was published in the early 60s and is probably the original introduction to the movement art to Western enthusiasts. His wife, Betty Cage, an administrator at the New York City Ballet, operated a tai chi class at the affiliated School of American Ballet until her death in 1999. Maisel was Director of the American Physical Fitness Research Institute and a consultant to the President's Council on Physical Fitness.

Maisel worked extensively with the Alexander Technique and wrote an introduction to a compendium of Alexander's writings he himself selected.

In his book Dr. America: The Lives of Thomas A. Dooley, 1927-1961, James T. Fisher acknowledges receipt of copies of medical files from Maisel on suspected cases of AIDS prior to 1980 (e. g. 1968 U. S. AIDS virus infection documentation). Maisel obtained the files from Robert Galagan, MD, Hawaii.
