= A Nation of Sheep =

A Nation of Sheep may refer to books by:

- William Lederer in 1961
- Andrew Napolitano in 2007
