= Reiko Sato =

American dancer and actress (1931–1981)

- 佐藤怜子
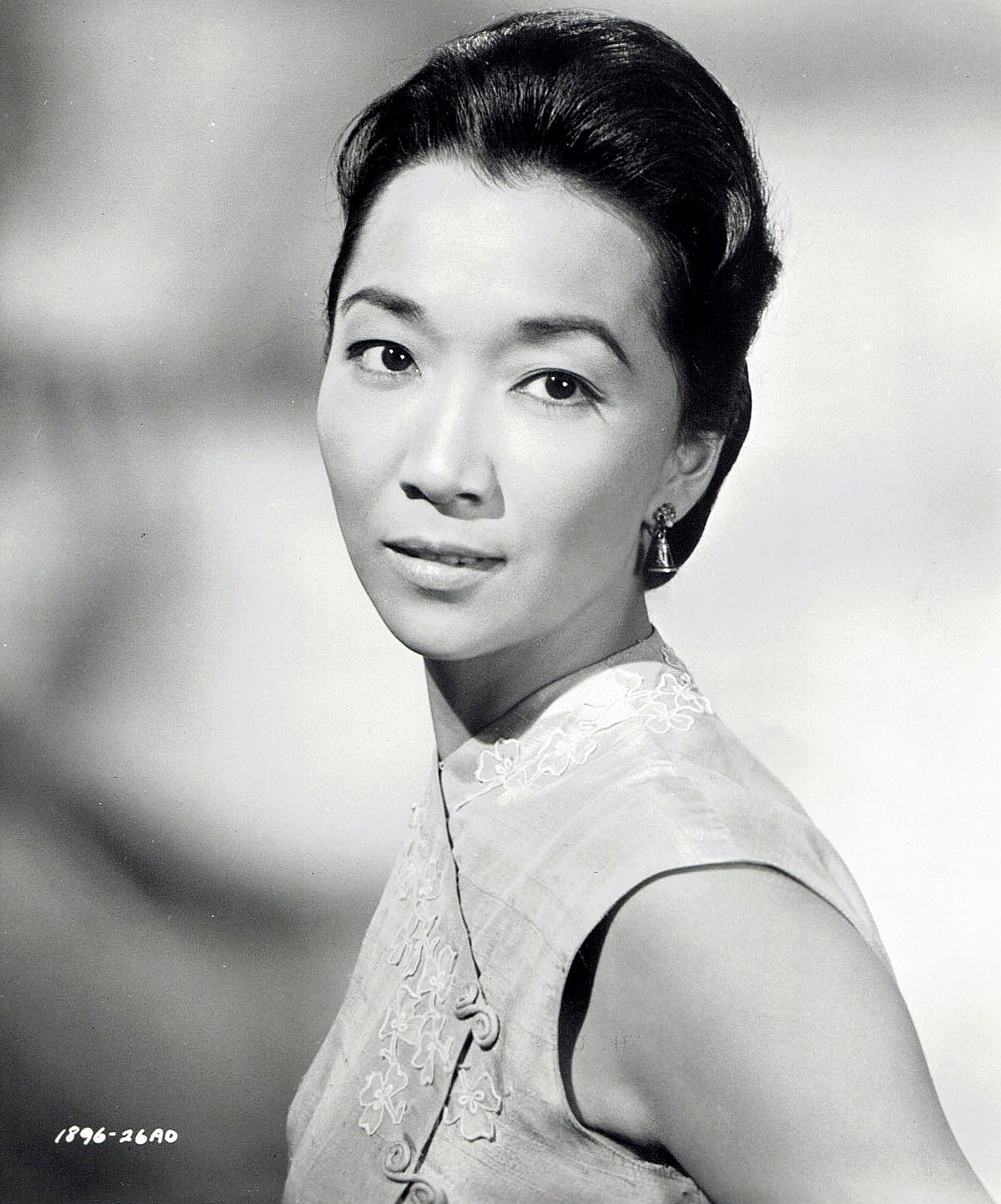
- Sato in a publicity photo for The Ugly American (1963)
- Born: December 19, 1931; Los Angeles, California, US
- Died: May 28, 1981 (aged 49); Los Angeles, California, US
- Years active: 1950–69

Reiko Sato (Japanese: 佐藤 怜子; December 19, 1931 – May 28, 1981) was an American dancer and actress.

== Early life ==
Sato was born in Los Angeles, California, to an issei Zen Buddhist priest, Ken-ichi Sato and his wife Chieko. She and her family were incarcerated at the Gila River War Relocation Center during World War II following the signing of Executive Order 9066. Her mother became a real estate investor after the war; Reiko also had an older brother, Keiichiro, and a younger brother, Koji. She graduated from Belmont High School in 1949, later attending Los Angeles City College where she continued her studies in ballet.

== Career ==
Sato is best known for playing seamstress Helen Chao in the 1961 feature film Flower Drum Song. She also had a dramatic role in The Ugly American, receiving personal coaching from actor Marlon Brando with whom she had a relationship. She had been on contract with Fox and Universal, but nothing materialized, and she retired from Hollywood.

She had performed as the original Princess of Ababu in the Broadway production of Kismet, as well as the movie. In 1955, she played the female lead of Lotus Blossom in the second national tour of John Patrick's play The Teahouse of the August Moon opposite Larry Parks. She was also in the Broadway play, Destry Rides Again, having two roles. Sato was scheduled to return to Broadway as part of a 1966 musical Chu Chem, but its chaotic Philadelphia tryout led to the production being cancelled before reaching New York.

She participated in regional theater as well, performing in the Valentina Oumansky Dramatic Dance Ensemble on September 24, 1970, in Hilo, Hawaii. Her last film was Now It Can Be Told, which was never completed and remains lost.

== Final years ==
Sato spent her final years involved in various organizations promoting equality for Asian-American performers. She lived on Mulholland Drive. She died of a brain aneurysm on May 28, 1981. Half of her ashes were sent to a Buddhist temple. The other half were "spirited away" to Marlon Brando's private island.

== Filmography ==
Year	Title	Role	Notes
1949	On the Town	Dancer	Uncredited
1950	Mother Didn't Tell Me	Suki	Uncredited
1950	Woman on the Run	Susie	
1953	Target Hong Kong	Dice Girl	Uncredited
1955	House of Bamboo	Charlie's Girl	Uncredited
1955	Kismet	1st Princess of Ababu	
1957	Sûpâ jaiantsu - Kaiseijin no majô		
1960	Hell to Eternity	Famika	
1961	Flower Drum Song	Helen Chao	
1963	The Ugly American	Rachani, Deong's Wife	(final film role)
