= Mary Florence Denton =

American educator

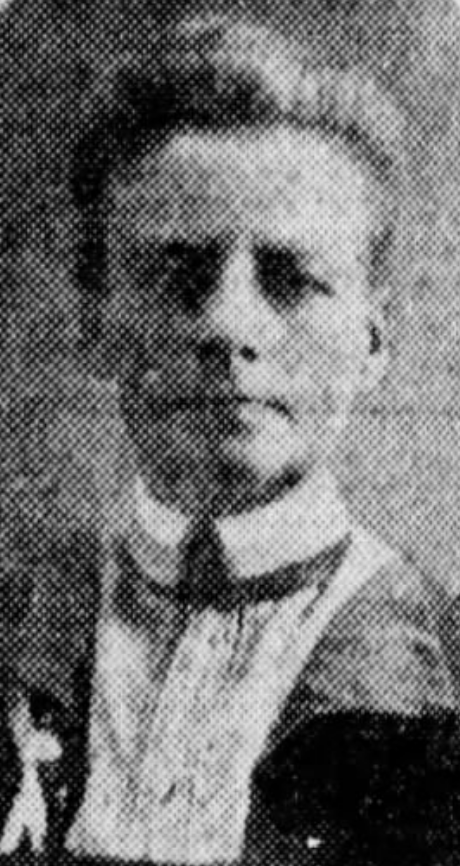
- Mary Florence Denton, from a 1918 newspaper.
- Born: July 4, 1857; Nevada County, California, United States
- Died: December 24, 1947 (aged 90); Kyoto, Japan
- Occupation: Educator

Mary Florence Denton (July 4, 1857 – December 24, 1947) was an American educator in Japan, and a longtime member of the faculty at Doshisha University in Kyoto.

== Early life ==
Mary Florence Denton was born in Grass Valley, California, the daughter of Edward Michael Denton and Mary Mehitable Strobridge Denton.

== Career ==
As a young woman, Denton was a teacher and temperance activist in Pasadena. She went to Japan in 1888, supported by the American Board of Commissioners for Foreign Missions, and taught English, Bible study, and cookery classes for many years at the Doshisha University in Kyoto. She raised funds for the school from American benefactors, lectured on Japan during her few furlough visits to the United States, and encouraged Doshisha students, including Hisa Nagano and Taki Handa, to pursue further study abroad. She was also active in the Red Cross, the WCTU and the YWCA in Japan, serving on the YWCA's national committee from 1910 to 1927. She retired from active teaching in 1928. In 1931, she was granted an honorary doctorate from Williams College, in recognition of her lifetime of teaching.

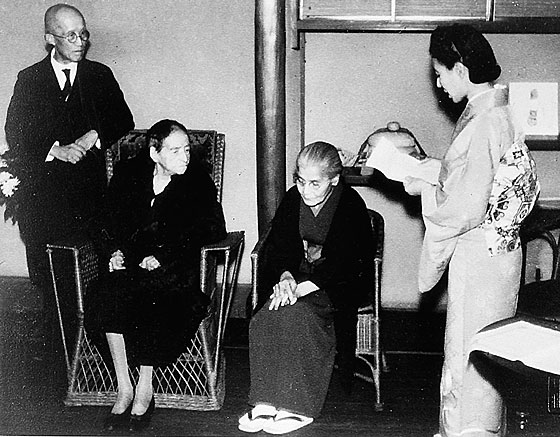
A photograph taken at Mary Florence Denton's 80th birthday celebration in 1937.

While living on the Doshisha campus, she often hosted American visitors to Japan, including Charles Lindbergh and Anne Morrow Lindbergh. In 1936, she hosted a visiting American art collector, Lilla Cabot Perry, who wrote about Denton, "She is doubtless in her late eighties, but made of wire and steel." Denton lived in Japan through World War II, despite several orders for Americans to leave the country. Because of her advanced age and frailty, and out of respect for her long service to the school, Doshisha College arranged for her to stay in her home, officially on house arrest, for the war's duration. Her family in the United States had no news from her during the war, only learning of her survival from an Associated Press report in October 1945.

== Personal life ==
Denton died from bronchitis in 1947, aged 90 years, in Kyoto. Her remains were buried in the common grave of missionary teachers, in the college cemetery. Her library was donated to the Doshisha University Library, and a building on the Doshisha campus is named Denton Hall in her memory. In 2008, the college celebrated the 150th anniversary of Denton's birth, with a program including two of her great-nieces, and a few people who had known Denton in her later years. One of her great-nieces was actress Sandra Church.
