= Dr. America =

1997 book by James Terence Fisher

Dr. America: The Lives of Thomas A. Dooley, 1927–1961
- Cover
- Author: James T. Fisher
- Language: English
- Genre: Biography
- Published: January 1997 (University of Massachusetts Press)
- Publication place: United States
- Media type: Print (Hardback & Paperback)
- Pages: 304 p. (paperback edition)
- ISBN: 1-55849-154-6; 978-1-55849-154-0

Dr. America: The Lives of Thomas A. Dooley, 1927–1961 is a book written by James T. Fisher, providing a historical discussion of Thomas Anthony Dooley III, an American medical missionary who worked in Vietnam and Laos in the 1950s and early 1960s. The book itself is viewed not only as a statement on Dooley's "lives" as a medical missionary, but it is also a socially scientific analysis of his life. A central argument of the book is that Dooley's work laid the ideological foundation for U.S. entry into Vietnam. Other important topics discussed are Dooley's personal journey towards becoming a "Jungle Doctor," Dooley's similarities and differences from Albert Schweitzer, Dooley as a contemporary Jesus or a redeemed man, and Dooley as a "historical bridge" between anticommunist McCarthyism and the President Kennedy's Vietnam policy. The biography is one volume of a series titled Culture, Politics, and the Cold War edited by Christian G. Appy.

== Themes ==
=== Historical bildungsroman towards a "Jungle Doctor of the New Age" ===
Fisher presents Dooley's life as a historical bildungsroman towards a "Jungle Doctor of a New Age," and he makes it clear that he will do so when he says that Dooley went from an "Irish-American rake" to a worldwide celebrity who served as a "historical bridge" between McCarthyism and the change in Vietnam policies started under President Kennedy in the early 1960s. Dooley goes from a boy, adolescent, and bachelor who disregards rules and remains unaware of the sociopolitical forces shaping his character to a medical officer of the military acting as a political pawn and finally to a "Jungle Doctor" who seeks to transcend political agendas while bridging the older age of anticommunism with the newer age of the focus on the advance of communism in Vietnam starting with the Kennedy administration.

At the start of Fisher's historical narrative, Dooley appears as an adolescent who defies the rules of his Catholic high school yet manages to get away with his wrongdoings because of his likable personality. Fisher presents Dooley as naive and unaware that he was being indoctrinated with Catholic values, and this aspect of his personality remains static throughout his college life. He points out that Dooley's disregard for rules contributed to his becoming a pawn for US intelligence operations in Vietnam (Dooley's expulsion from medical school compelled him to join the military and serve as medical officer). Dooley was just the man needed to establish a friendship between the United States and South Vietnam, and US intelligence officers such as Edward Lansdale exploited Dooley's personality to enhance US anticommunist presence in Indochina. Dooley's time in the military allowed him to medically aid the destitute from North Vietnam, thereby allowing him to effectively cultivate a friendship with the emerging political leader in the South Ngo Dinh Diem. Fisher also cites Dooley's membership in the Vietnam Lobby as evidence for the idea that Dooley was exploited as a political tool for Cold War interests.

But Fisher then points out that after Dooley's expulsion from the military because of his homosexuality, Dooley sought to transcend the idea of a political pawn by learning to serve as an actual "Jungle Doctor." Like Albert Schweitzer, Dooley learned how to market himself to the public, a crucial characteristic of the "Jungle Doctor" archetype that Albert Schweitzer had already established. Fisher proposes that through media and showbiz, both of which were facilitated by Dooley's experience as a pawn advancing Cold War agendas, Dooley gave himself enough of the publicity attached with assuming the "Jungle Doctor" identity that government officials were taking Dooley's plans into consideration when constructing their political agendas (unlike before, when Dooley was instructed to follow what he was told by CIA officers). Dooley obtained an avenue for self-marketing when, during his time in the military, intelligence officers connected him with William J. Lederer, a public information officer who helped Dooley publish Deliver Us from Evil.

Fisher reveals how Dooley latched onto the "Jungle Doctor" identity when he adopted his first civilian mission: Operation Laos. After Dooley met with Albert Schweitzer, the exemplar of the "Jungle Doctor" archetype, to learn from Schweitzer's work, Dooley began establishing clinics in Laos which were financially fortified by donations including those from Catholic congregations. During these missions, Dooley was portrayed as an altruist who genuinely cared about the people whom he served, a portrayal consistent with the "Jungle Doctor" identity.

Fisher clearly mentions that Dooley's journey through life terminates not simply in his becoming a "Jungle Doctor" but also in his becoming a "Jungle Doctor" of a new age. Fisher points out that Dooley served as the "historical bridge" between the older era of McCarthyism and the newer age of Irish Catholic John F. Kennedy, and he uses two facts to support this claim. First, Dooley was friends with Kennedy's father and president Kennedy himself, and second, Dooley was also an Irish Catholic (like President Kennedy) who used showbiz to promote his work.

Ultimately, Fisher presents a bildungsroman in real life: Thomas Dooley, a man who builds himself into a "Jungle Doctor of a New Age" from an "undisciplined Irish-American rake."

=== Thomas Anthony Dooley III and Albert Schweitzer as two sides of the same coin ===
Although Dooley explicitly claims that he and Schweitzer have different, somewhat opposite philosophies as to how they approach their medical missionary work, Fisher portrays the two medical missionaries as two opposites who make similar global impacts. Whereas Fisher shows Schweitzer as a Protestant missionary from a family of intellectuals including his cousin (philosopher Jean-Paul Sartre), Dooley comes from a family of corporate businessmen of the 1920s. Schweitzer was a Protestant missionary, whereas Dooley was Irish Catholic. Whereas Schweitzer did not uniquely identify with a specific nationality while performing his medical missionary work as a whole, Fisher cites Dooley as someone who claims to bring uniquely American values to Southeast Asia. In fact, Fisher points out that Dooley's objective was to show the Laotians how good the Americans were in going to help improve their medical well-being. Fisher also presents how effective this was, citing the Laotian term Thanh Mo America (Dr. America) used to address Dooley. Not only did Schweitzer not explicitly identify with the values of his German and French background, but he also expressed his dislike for Dooley's identification with American principles. And not only did Schweitzer dislike some of the ways Dooley approached his medical missionary work, but Fisher also cites Dooley distinguishing himself from aspects of Schweitzer's identity. Whereas Schweitzer was claimed to harbor racist, colonialist, and paternalist attitudes towards the people whom he helped, Dooley explicitly mentioned in Fisher's biography that he was not racist, not colonialist, and not paternalist.

However, Fisher points out that despite their differences, the two ultimately arrive at similar types of work, achieve similar results, and harbor many personal similarities. Dooley and Schweitzer showed self-righteous behavior, Schweitzer in his love for the camera and Dooley in benefiting from an eponyme song by the Kingston Trio, or even by giving media coverage to his surgical intervention for cancer to sensitize donators in favour of his foundation (Medico). Both gained world fame, as evidenced by the Nobel Peace Prize awarded to Schweitzer in 1954 and by Dooley claimed to have attained "world fame" in his obituary in Time magazine. Both establish clinics (Schweitzer in French equatorial Africa and Dooley in Laos), and Fisher shows both Schweitzer and Dooley as characteristic of the "planner" model of medical missionary work described in William Easterly's The White Man's Burden: Why the West's Efforts to Aid the Rest Have Done So Much Ill and So Little Good (unlike Leader Stirling, who adopted more of the "searcher" perspective that Easterly describes). Also, Fisher mentions that both Schweitzer and Dooley were criticized for being so absorbed with self-marketing and public image that they were absent for long periods of time from where they were performing their medical missionary work.

=== Contemporary Jesus or simply a redeemed man? ===
When evaluating Dooley, Fisher presents the question of whether Dooley is best seen as a contemporary Jesus or simply as an individual redeemed by his good works in Laos. Fisher cites a letter by a third grader to Dooley claiming that Dooley is "just like Jesus." Teresa Gallagher names Dooley a "little flower of Jesus" in her prayer for him. However, Fisher also presents Dooley as an egotist who loves the media; Jesus, on the other hand, has been considered a selfless individual who surrenders his will to God's. Fisher also shows Dooley as a man with personal vices (such as an unawareness of the political forces shaping his character) who seeks to redeem himself from falling prey to United States political agendas. As Dooley switches from more militarily based missionary work to civilian missionary work, Fisher points out that Dooley's motivations become more religious rather than political. He points to Dooley's ardently professed Catholicism in his later life as evidence supporting this notion. While Fisher does not assess which of these two presentations is more valid, the latter portrayal of Dooley is consistent with the fact that medical missionary work has been seen as a heroic or redeeming endeavor.

=== Dooley as a "historical bridge" ===
Fisher proposes that Dooley serves as a "historical bridge" between anticommunist McCarthyism and the focus on the advance of communism in Vietnam starting with the administration of John F. Kennedy. At the end of the book, Fisher states, "in the end he [Dooley] provided the bridge between Joe McCarthy and Jack Kennedy, to the great benefit of the latter....that accomplishment...ushered in a new dispensation in American life, rich in the kind of tragedy and hope this 'old romantic' had so ardently cultivated in his own brief lifetime." The author points to two major points that support his claim: first, Fisher claims that Dooley's motivation to serve as a medical missionary during his time in the military was fueled by his desire to eradicate communism from South Vietnam and to establish a democracy there. This ideology was consistent with the domino theory that motivated the US to enter Vietnam. Second, Dooley had a strong friendship with Kennedy's father, and both Dooley and Kennedy were young Irish Catholics. The fact that both anticommunism and the young Irish Catholic spirit of Kennedy were embodied in Dooley supports Fisher's claim of Dooley serving as a "historical bridge" between these two time periods.

Fisher also develops the notion that Dooley's actions, principles and commitments fueled the transition from the era of a confessional help to the poor towards a post-confessional, i.e. humanitarian help, as a consequence of the shift from the colonial era towards the cold war era, a humanitarian action which is linked to political and economical interest to the third-world populations. J.F. Kennedy would invoke Dooley's actions when creating the American Peace Corps, conceived as a tool to diffuse a pro-American feeling through a direct person to person interaction in the social field, as advocated by T. A. Dooley.

== Significance and reception ==
=== Significance of the biography ===
Dr. America: The Lives of Thomas A. Dooley, 1927–1961 is the first historical biography of Dooley that has been claimed to evenhandedly evaluate him as a historical figure. Most pieces written about Dooley have either praised or condemned him. As for praise, in People magazine 18 years after Dooley's death, a priest claimed that Dooley "was a saint" and not a "CIA spook". In addition, in the April 20, 1958, issue of the New York Times Magazine, Dooley is claimed to have provided a novel "human touch" to foreign aid. Dooley's obituary also describes him positively, namely as someone who "won world fame" tending to the medical needs of Laotians and the Vietnamese. More critical assessments of Dooley have also been made. Some of the 1950s media condemned him as an absentee missionary who was simply attracting attention to an organization that he did not directly supervise. However, Fisher's biography provides a more neutral view of Dooley, claiming that Dooley, although in some way constrained to his "missionary position" by his successive evictions from medical exercise in the US and from the Army, was a "historical bridge" between anticommunism and the focus on the advance of communism in Vietnam starting with the Kennedy administration.

The biography is also one of the few books that even-handedly evaluate Dooley in the context of medical missionary publications. Most publications about medical missionaries make an overall judgment about their work or their character, and the prose of these publications adheres to such judgments. Tracy Kidder, in Mountains Beyond Mountains, provides a generally favorable view of Paul Farmer as a medical missionary. In the foreword to Albert Schweitzer's The Primeval Forest, William Foege portrays a generally positive view of Schweitzer, saying that his book "is the story of a gifted scholar who had golden opportunities to enrich himself." Publications making more negative statements of medical missionaries are also present. Toni Morrison's bestselling novel Song of Solomon provides an unfavorable view of Schweitzer, presenting him as someone who didn't care about Africans but who was "in a laboratory testing himself." Fisher's publication ultimately remains as one of the few that provide an even-handed portrayal of a medical missionary.

=== Contemporary reception ===
The biography received generally positive reviews. Kirkus Reviews magazine described the book as "an accomplished biography of an almost forgotten, but important, player in American Vietnam War policy-making in the 1950s," calling it "insightful and enlightening." Washington Post Book World affirmed the book's evenhanded portrayal of Dooley. The reviewer said that Fisher "gives us, as his subtitle promises, many 'lives': a vain, arrogant, self-promoting, ambitious, manipulative storyteller who knew how to exaggerate, tell small fibs and big lies; but also a sensitive, generous, idealistic and compassionate doctor who put himself on the line, under difficult circumstances for the most needy of people."

=== Disagreements with Fisher's analysis ===
One review published in The Catholic Historical Review disagrees with Fisher's analysis of Dooley's personality. Reviewer William D. Sharpe said that Fisher mistakenly pointed to Dooley's homosexuality as Dooley's personal flaw. Sharpe said that Dooley's personal flaw was his "lying, egocentricity, manipulativeness, and lack of close human relationships," not his unconventional relationships with his other men.

Also, while Fisher calls Dooley an "authentic spy," a priest quoted in People magazine claims that Dooley was "a CIA informant, not a spy."

In addition, while Fisher presents Dooley's life as growth into a "Jungle Doctor," he presents quotations claiming that Dooley remains an "overgrown kid" throughout his life.

== General references ==
- Fisher, J.T. (1997) Dr. America: The Lives of Thomas A. Dooley, 1927–1961. University of Massachusetts Press
