= Ugly American (pejorative) =

Stereotype about American citizens

"Ugly American" is a stereotype depicting American citizens as exhibiting loud, arrogant, self-absorbed, demeaning, thoughtless, ignorant, and ethnocentric behavior mainly abroad, but also at home. Although the term is usually associated with or applied to travelers and tourists, it also applies to U.S. corporate businesses in the international arena.

The Collins English Dictionary defines an Ugly American as "a stereotypical representation of an American tourist as a brash and insensitive philistine." The Merriam-Webster dictionary’s definition is: "an American in a foreign country whose behavior is offensive to the people of that country."

== Origin ==
The term made its appearance through the title of the 1958 book, The Ugly American. The book was a thinly fictionalized chronicle of American diplomatic insensitivity, ineptness, and bungling in Southeast Asia. (Note: In the book, "the titular ugly American is actually a kind, practical, wealthy engineer who is humble, speaks the local language, and works with people in their villages solving local problems — the exact opposite of what the term has come to mean.") The message of the book was that American officials abroad were ignorant of local customs, social norms, and culture, and consequently losing influence to communism in the region, during the period of the Cold War.

Since then, the term "ugly American" has become shorthand for the stereotype of loud, boorish American behavior abroad. Although the 1958 novel was about diplomacy and made no reference to American tourists, the evolution of the term's usage to refer to ill-mannered Americans in foreign countries took place rapidly. In December 1959, Newsweek magazine referred to "poorly oriented" American study-abroad students in Europe as "the 'ugly' ones," and in June 1960, the mass-circulation Parade magazine ran an article about tourism titled "Don't Be an Ugly American," written by Frances Knight, director of the U.S. Passport Office.

== Usage ==
=== Sports ===
The term has also been widely used in the international sporting arena. The term was invoked after Justin Leonard holed a 45-foot putt on the 17th green at the 33rd Ryder Cup held in September 1999, resulting in extensive and adverse media coverage.

Later, at the 2000 Sydney Olympics, the term was widely used after members of the US 4 × 100 relay team pranced around the stadium, flexing their muscles and making poses with the American flag, after winning a gold medal. One foreign journalist called the incident "one of the most cringe-making exhibitions that the Olympics has seen". This event was heavily criticized even by the American press and public. The members of the relay team were contrite and apologized for the incident the same day. Then, at the 2006 Winter Olympics in Turin, the term was regularly used after the skiing superstar Bode Miller, who bragged about skiing drunk before the Olympics, was adversely compared to the term "Miller time", and went home with no medals. A lesser-known teammate was sent home for fighting in a bar.

In tennis, the term was used in regard to players at the 1987 Davis Cup for unsportsmanlike conduct. John McEnroe was regularly cited in the media as being an "Ugly American" for his on-court tantrums and off-court negative comments about London and Paris. In contrast, Andre Agassi who early in his tennis career was labeled a "potential ugly American", managed to transform himself into a crowd favourite. In women's tennis, Serena Williams's outburst at the 2009 US Open semifinal against Kim Clijsters, and again at the 2018 tournament reiterated the "Ugly American" label.

After the United States women's national soccer team lost to Sweden in the quarterfinals of women's football of the 2016 Summer Olympics in Brazil, Hope Solo called the Swedish team cowards unleashing multiple Twitter references associating her with this term. At the same Olympics, Gold medalist Ryan Lochte was named the ugly American by media outlets after falsely reporting a robbery at gunpoint during the tournament. Local police investigation showed that he and fellow swimmers in fact caused damage to a petrol station in Rio and were required to pay for the damage.

=== Politics ===
In May 2008, the US House sub-committee passed a bill (House Resolution 4080) that would allow more foreign fashion models to work in the United States, and was subsequently dubbed the "ugly American bill". George W. Bush was often referred to as "The Ugly American" in part because of his stance on foreign policies. In 2007, Presidential hopeful John McCain outlined a series of measures to roll back Bush policies and counter the "ugly American" image. Numerous opinion pieces have accused President Donald Trump of behaving in a way that fits the "Ugly American" stereotype, including in The New York Times, The Washington Post, Forbes, The Nation, Financial Times, The Sydney Morning Herald, and the Financial Post.

=== Popular culture ===
The "ugly American" tourist stereotype has been heavily depicted in films, with characters such as Sheriff J.W. Pepper in The Man with the Golden Gun, the Griswald family in National Lampoon's European Vacation, the crude tourists in If It's Tuesday, This Must Be Belgium, the high-ranking executive C.R.MacNamara in One, Two, Three, the energy analyst Bryan Woodman in Syriana, Ralph Jones in King Ralph, and the boorish businessman Wendell Armbruster in Avanti!. The 2004 film EuroTrip was originally slated to be named "The Ugly Americans" due to its depiction of stereotypical American tourists in Europe. The producers changed the title shortly before its release. A study carried out in 2002 revealed that Hollywood also contributes to the "Ugly American" image. The study found that the more access other countries had to American programs, the higher their negative attitudes toward Americans tended to be.

The 2008 black comedy film In Bruges has the two protagonists, Irish hitmen hiding out in the Belgian city of Bruges, encounter obese American tourists who fit the "ugly American" stereotype, being crude, ignorant, loud and boorish. The movie Sex and the City 2 has been cited as a typical portrayal of the "ugly American" image, where Samantha makes fun of Middle Eastern culture and women in traditional dress during a visit to the United Arab Emirates.

The Simpsons episode "The Regina Monologues" had the Simpson family getting into all sorts of trouble in England due to their boorish behavior, which results from ignorance of and unconcern for the local culture.

== See also ==
- American exceptionalism
- Americentrism
- Anti-American sentiment
- Occidentalism
- Plastic Paddy
- Stereotypes of Americans
- The Quiet American
- Ugly Americans (TV series)
- Ugly Americans: The True Story of the Ivy League Cowboys Who Raided the Asian Markets for Millions
