= Charles Tomlinson Griffes =

American composer (1884–1920)

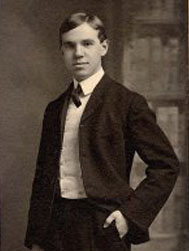
- Charles Griffes at the beginning of the twentieth century
- Born: September 17, 1884; Elmira, New York
- Died: April 8, 1920 (aged 35); New York City
- Resting place: Bloomfield Cemetery, Bloomfield, Essex County, New Jersey, U.S.
- Education: Stern Conservatory
- Occupation: Composer
- Years active: 1910–1919

Charles Tomlinson Griffes (US: /ˈɡrɪfəs/ GRIFF-fiss; September 17, 1884 – April 8, 1920) was an American composer for piano, chamber ensembles and voice. His initial works are influenced by German Romanticism, but after he relinquished the German style, his later works make him the most famous American representative of musical Impressionism, along with Charles Martin Loeffler. He was fascinated by the exotic, mysterious sound of the French Impressionists, and was compositionally much influenced by them while he was in Europe. He also studied the work of contemporary Russian composers such as Scriabin, whose influence is also apparent in his use of synthetic scales.

== Musical career ==
Griffes was born in Elmira, New York. He had early piano lessons with his sister Katherine and later studied piano with Mary Selena Broughton, who taught at Elmira College. Broughton had a profound impact on his personal and musical development. After early studies on piano and organ in his home town, on recommendation of Broughton, he went to Berlin to study with pianist Ernst Jedliczka and Gottfried Galston at the Stern Conservatory. Although recognised as a performer, Griffes grew more interested in composition. Despite being advised against it by Broughton, he left the conservatory and was briefly taught by composer Engelbert Humperdinck. During his time in Berlin he composed several German songs and the Symphonische Phantasie for orchestra.

On returning to the U.S. in 1907, he became director of music studies at the Hackley School for boys in Tarrytown, New York, a post which he held until his early death thirteen years later. His post has been described as "grim and unrewarding", though it gave him financial stability. He continued to compose at Hackley in his free time and promoted his music during the summer.

His most famous works are the White Peacock, for piano (1915, orchestrated in 1919); his Piano Sonata (1917–18, revised 1919); a tone poem, The Pleasure Dome of Kubla Khan, after the fragment by Coleridge (1912, revised in 1916), and Poem for Flute and Orchestra (1918). He also wrote numerous programmatic pieces for piano, chamber ensembles, and for voice. The amount and quality of his music is impressive considering his short life and his full-time teaching job, and much of his music is still performed.

His unpublished Sho-jo (1917), a one-act pantomimic drama based on Japanese themes, is one of the earliest works by an American composer to show direct inspiration from the music of Japan.

He was friends with the Japanese dancer Michio Ito, and the two men were associated with theatrical ventures during the last three years of Griffes' life. In 1918, Ito gave three dance recitals interpreting White Peacock, with Griffes at the piano.

== Personal life ==
Griffes died of influenza in New York City during the 1918 worldwide Spanish flu pandemic at the age of 35 and is buried in Bloomfield Cemetery in Bloomfield, New Jersey. His papers passed to his younger sister Marguerite, who chose to destroy many that explicitly related to his life as a homosexual. Donna Anderson (1935–2018) was his literary executor. Griffes kept meticulous diaries, some in German, which chronicled his musical accomplishments from 1907 to 1919, and also dealt honestly with his homosexuality, including his regular patronage of the gay bathhouses at Lafayette Place and the Produce Exchange.

Charles Tomlinson Griffes was drawn into the gay world by the baths not just because he had sex there, but because he met men there who helped him find apartments and otherwise make his way through the city, who appreciated his music, who gave him new insights into his character, and who became his good friends. The gay world became a central part of his everyday world, even though he kept it hidden from his nongay associates.

— George Chauncey, Gay New York, 1994, p. 224

During his time as a student in Berlin, he was devoted to his "special friend" Emil Joèl (aka "Konrad Wölcke"). In later life, he had a long-term relationship with John Meyer (biographer Edward Maisel used the pseudonym Dan C. Martin), a married New York policeman.

== Musical compositions ==
External audio
- You may hear Griffes' Poem for Flute and Orchestra (1918) played by Joseph Mariano and Howard Hanson's Eastman-Rochester Orchestra in 1942 Here on Archive.org
- You may hear Griffes' The White Peacock (1915) played by Myra Hess in 1929; Here on DAHR

=== Stage works ===
- The Kairn of Koridwen (dance drama in two scenes, after E. Schuré), fl, 2 cl, 2 hn, hp, cel, pf, 1916, New York, February 10, 1917; arr. pf, 1916
- Sho-jo (Japanese pantomime in one scene), fl, ob, cl, hp, Chin. drum, tam-tam, timp, 4 str, 1917, rev. ?1919, Atlantic City, NJ, August 5, 1917
- Sakura-sakura (Japanese folkdance arrangement), fl, cl, hp, 2 vn, vc, db, ?1917, Atlantic City, NJ, August 5, 1917
- The White Peacock (solo ballet, arrangement of piano work), orchestra, ?1919, New York, June 22, 1919
- Salut au monde (festival drama in three acts, after Walt Whitman), fl, cl, 2 hn, tpt, 2 trombones, timp, drums, 2 hp, pf, 1919, incomplete, New York, April 22, 1922

=== Orchestral works ===
- Overture, c1905
- Symphonische Phantasie, 1907, arranged for 2 pianos, ?1910
- The Pleasure-Dome of Kubla Khan, Op. 8, 1917, Boston Symphony Orchestra, cond. P. Monteux, Boston, November 28, 1919 [version of piano piece, 1912]
- Notturno für Orchester, ?1918, Philadelphia Orchestra, cond. L. Stokowski, Philadelphia, December 19, 1919; arr. piano and string orch.
- Poem, flute and orchestra, 1918, G. Barrère, New York Symphony Orchestra, cond. W. Damrosch, November 16, 1919
- Bacchanale, ?1919, Philadelphia Orchestra, cond. Stokowski, Philadelphia, December 19, 1919 [version of Scherzo for piano, 1913]
- Clouds, ?1919, Philadelphia Orchestra, cond. Stokowski, Philadelphia, December 19, 1919 [version of piano piece, 1916]
- The White Peacock, ?1919, Philadelphia Orchestra, cond. Stokowski, Philadelphia, December 19, 1919 [version of piano piece, 1915]
- Nocturne, 1919 [version of 2nd movement of Piano Sonata, 1917–18]
- Notturno, strings [version of orchestral piece, ?1918]

=== Chamber music ===
- Three Tone-Pictures, woodwinds and harp, 1915, nos. 1–2 Barrère Ensemble, New York, December 19, 1916; arr. wind quintet, str qnt, pf, ?1919, New York Chamber Music Society, Greenwich, Connecticut, June 4, 1920 [versions of piano pieces, 1910–12]
1. The Lake at Evening
2. The Vale of Dreams
3. The Night Winds
- Komori uta, Noge no yama, fl, ob, cl, hp, 2 vn, vc, db, ?Chin. drum, ?1917 [Japanese melodies]
- Two Sketches based on Indian Themes: Lento e mesto, Allegro giocoso, str quartet, 1918–19; ?première, Flonzaley Quartet, New York, November 24, 1920

=== Piano ===
- Six Variations, Op. 2, 1898
- Four Preludes, Op. 4, 1899–1900
- Three Tone-Pictures, Op. 5: The Lake at Evening, 1910, L. Hodgson, New York, April 3, 1914; The Vale of Dreams, 1912; The Night Winds, 1911; arr. ens, 1915, arr. orch. 1919
- Fantasy Pieces, Op. 6: Barcarolle, 1912, Griffes, Lowell, Massachusetts, November 3, 1914; Notturno, 1915; Scherzo, 1913, orchestrated as Bacchanale, ?1919
- Roman Sketches, Op. 7: The White Peacock, 1915, W. Christie, New York, February 23, 1916, orchestrated ?1919; Nightfall, 1916; The Fountain of the Acqua Paola, 1916; Clouds, 1916, orchestrated ?1919
- Children's pieces, first published under name of Arthur Tomlinson: 6 Short Pieces, 1918; 6 Patriotic Songs, 1918; 6 Bugle-Call Pieces, 1918; 6 Familiar Songs (1919); 6 Pieces for Treble Clef (1919)
- Mazurka, 1898–1900
- Sonata, f, ?1904, Griffes, Berlin, June 22, 1905
- Sonata, D, 1 movement, ?1910
- Symphonische Phantasie, 2 pf, ?1910 [version of orchestra piece, 1907]
- Sonata, D, 2 movements, ?1911
- The Pleasure-Dome of Kubla Khan, 1912, rev. 1915, orchestrated 1917
- Sonata, f, ?1912
- Rhapsody, b, 1914
- Piece, B, ?1915
- De profundis, 1915
- Legend, 1915
- Piece, d, 1915
- Winter Landscape, c1912
- Piece, E, 1916
- Dance, a, ?1916
- Sonata, 1917–18, Griffes, New York, February 26, 1918, 2nd movement orchestrated as Nocturne, 1919
- Three Preludes, 1919
- Notturno [arr. of orchestral piece, ?1918]
- Arrangement of J. Offenbach: Barcarolle, Belle nuit, o nuit d'amour, piano solo, perf. 1910
- Arrangement of E. Humperdinck: Hänsel und Gretel, overture, 2 pianos, 1910

=== Organ ===
- Chorale on ""Allein Gott in der Höh sei Ehr", 1910

=== Songs ===
- Tone-Images, Op. 3
1. La fuite de la lune (Oscar Wilde), 1912
2. Symphony in Yellow (Wilde), 1912
3. We'll to the Woods, and Gather May (W. E. Henley), 1914
- Two Rondels, Op. 4, c1914
1. This Book of Hours (W. Crane)
2. Come, Love, across the Sunlit Land (C. Scollard)
- Four Impressions (Wilde)
1. Le jardin, 1915
2. Impression du matin, 1915
3. La mer, 1912, new setting 1916
4. Le réveillon, 1914
- Three Poems, Op. 9, 1916
1. In a Myrtle Shade (William Blake)
2. Waikiki (R. Brooke), E. Gauthier, M. Hansotte, New York, April 22, 1918
3. Phantoms (A. Giovannitti)
- Five Poems of Ancient China and Japan, Op. 10; E. Gauthier, Griffes, New York, November 1, 1917
1. So-fei Gathering Flowers (Wang Chang-Ling), 1917
2. Landscape (Sada-ihe), 1916
3. The Old Temple among the Mountains (Chang Wen-Chang), 1916
4. Tears (Wang Seng-Ju), 1916
5. A Feast of Lanterns (Yuan Mei), 1917
- Two Poems (J. Masefield); E. Gauthier, M. Hansotte, New York, April 22, 1918
1. An Old Song Re-Sung, 1918
2. Sorrow of Mydath, 1917
- Three Poems of Fiona MacLeod, Op. 11, 1918; V. Janacopulos, Griffes, New York, March 22, 1919; orchestrated 1918, M. Dresser, Philadelphia Orch, cond. T. Rich, Wilmington, DE, March 24, 1919
1. The Lament of Ian the Proud
2. Thy Dark Eyes to Mine
3. The Rose of the Night
- Si mes vers avaient des ailes (V. Hugo), 1901
- Sur ma lyre l'autre fois (C.A. Sainte-Beuve), ?1901
- German Songs, c1903–1909
1. Am Kreuzweg wird begraben (Heinrich Heine)
2. An den Wind (Nikolaus Lenau)
3. Auf ihrem Grab (Heine)
4. Auf dem Teich, dem Regungslosen (Lenau)
5. Auf geheimen Waldespfade (Lenau)
6. Das ist ein Brausen und Heulen (Heine)
7. Das sterbende Kind (Emanuel Geibel)
8. Der träumende See (Julius Mosen)
9. Des müden Abendlied (Geibel)
10. Elfe (J. von Eichendorff)
11. Entflieh mit mir (Heine)
12. Es fiel ein Reif (Heine)
13. Frühe (Eichendorff)
14. Gedicht von Heine (Mit schwarzen Segeln)
15. Ich weiss nicht, wie's geschieht (Geibel)
16. Könnt’ ich mit dir dort oben gehn (Mosen)
17. Meeres Stille (J. W. von Goethe)
18. Mein Herz ist wie die dunkle Nacht (Geibel)
19. Mir war, als müsst’ ich graben (Das Grab) (Christian Friedrich Hebbel)
20. Nacht liegt auf den fremden Wegen (Heine)
21. So halt’ ich endlich dich umfangen (Geibel)
22. Winternacht (Lenau)
23. Wo ich bin, mich rings umdunkelt (Heine), c1903–11
24. Wohl lag ich einst in Gram und Schmerz (Geibel)
25. Zwei Könige saßen auf Orkadal (Geibel), before 1910
- The Water-Lily (J.B. Tabb), 1911
- The Half-Ring Moon (Tabb), 1912
- Nachtlied (Geibel), 1912
- Pierrot (S. Teasdale), 1912
- Les ballons (Wilde), ?1912, rev. 1915
- Cleopatra to the Asp (Tabb)
- Evening Song (S. Lanier)
- The First Snowfall (Tabb)
- Phantoms (Tabb), c1912
- The War-Song of the Vikings (F. MacLeod), 1914
- Two Birds flew into the Sunset Glow (Rom. trad.), 1914
- Song of the Dagger (Rom. trad.), 1916
- In the Harem (Chu Ch′ing-yü), ?1917
- Hampelas, Kinanti, Djakoan (Javanese trad.), c1917

=== Choral works ===
- Passionlied ("O Haupt voll Blut und Wunden") (P. Gerhardt), SSATB, 1906
- Lobe den Herren (J. Neander), SSATB, 1906
- Dies ist der Tag (I. Watts), SSATB, 1906
- These things shall be (J. A. Symonds), unison chorus, 1916
