= Ugly Americans (book) =

2004 book by Ben Mezrich

Ugly Americans: The True Story of the Ivy League Cowboys Who Raided the Asian Markets for Millions
- Paperback edition
- Author: Ben Mezrich
- Language: English
- Subject: Finance, trading
- Publisher: William Morrow and Company
- Publication date: May 4, 2004
- Publication place: United States
- Media type: Print, e-book
- Pages: 288
- ISBN: 0-060-57500-X

Ugly Americans: The True Story of the Ivy League Cowboys Who Raided the Asian Markets for Millions is a book by Ben Mezrich that recounts the exploits of an American called John Malcolm (a pseudonym) arbitraging index futures in Japan in the 1990s. The book was released on May 4, 2004 by William Morrow and Company.

By 2008 Kevin Spacey's Trigger Street Productions has the film rights to the book.

== Plot summary ==
In 1992, twenty Ivy League football players visit Japan, to play an exhibition match against Japanese college kids. On this trip, Princeton University's contribution to that all-star-Ivy team, John Malcolm, encountered a Princeton alum, Dean Carney (also a pseudonym). Carney was an executive in Kidder Peabody's Tokyo office, and he suggested Malcolm contact him about a job if his pro football career did not pan out.

When it did not, and following a job search on Wall Street, Malcolm contacted Carney in 1993. Malcolm then became one of KP's two Osaka-based traders. This lasted until April 1994, when KP discovered a $350 million "accounting glitch," and assigned responsibility for the glitch to one of its managing directors, Joseph Jett. KP (and its corporate parent, General Electric) made sweeping cutbacks in their trading operations as a result. Both Carney and Malcolm—neither of whom had anything to do with Jett's accounting trickery—were out of jobs, and they went their separate ways.

Malcolm took a position with a venerable English bank, Barings. He was again to work out of Osaka, but this time his orders were coming from Singapore, where Barings' star trader, Nick Leeson, held court. Leeson, though, was making huge unauthorized trades during this period. In January 1995 he made an enormous bet on a rise in the key Japanese stock exchange index, known as the Nikkei (large enough so that if he won, he would recover all his losses). However, the huge bet went against him, due to the Kobe earthquake (January 17) and its devastating effects on Japan's economy. After a brief period as a fugitive, Leeson was captured and did prison time. Meanwhile, Barings suffered historic loses from the gamble, and later went into receivership.

For the second time in eight months, a superior's malfeasance had cost Malcolm a job. He called Carney for help. Carney, meanwhile, had founded a hedge fund, and Malcolm was soon trading for it, primarily index arbitrage. In 1994, the Hong Kong government created a tracker fund for the Hang Seng (the Hong Kong equivalent of the Dow Jones or the Nikkei; see Tracker Fund of Hong Kong). In 1995, after Malcolm was settled into his Tokyo job, a company named Pacific Century Cyberworks (PCC) merged with Hong Kong Telecom, and under the terms of the tracker funds' charter, its managers had to buy $225 million worth of PCC stock. This was widely known, and so several traders were "front running" this deal, i.e. buying PCC stock ahead of the fund's expected purchases.

Malcolm, though, discovered that the tracker fund was not going to buy the PCC stock through the exchanges at all. It made a private off-exchange deal with PCC's founder Richard Li. This meant that, when the day of the expected fund purchases arrived and no purchases took place, there'd be a strong downward pressure on the stock price. Accordingly, on Malcolm's suggestion, Carney's hedge fund took a "short" position on $100 million of PCC stock. In the event, the tracking fund did not make the expected purchases, and the price dropped dramatically—Malcolm covered the short position, winning his firm more than twenty million dollars. This one deal made Malcolm a star, known to expat western traders throughout east Asia as their "hot young gunslinger."

The ending of the book turns on another, quite similar, but even larger deal involving the addition to the Nikkei index of several high-tech firms. This is the deal that justifies the book—Malcolm made Carney's firm five hundred million dollars in cash out of the restructuring of the Nikkei. Disillusioned, Malcolm then leaves Carney's employ and heads for semi-retirement in Bermuda, where he still does light trading.

Other elements which Mezrich intertwines into the narrative with the main characters include the sex industry in Japan and the role of the Yakuza in Japanese society and finance.

== See also ==
- Roman à clef
- Ugly American (disambiguation)
- Other works about traders and trading
  - Category:Books about traders
  - Category:Trading films
