= The Edge of Tomorrow (Dooley book) =

- First edition
- Author: Thomas A. Dooley
- Language: English
- Publisher: Farrar, Straus and Cudahy
- Publication date: 1958
- Publication place: United States
- Pages: 208
- OCLC: 1161450

The Edge of Tomorrow is a 1958 book by American physician Thomas A. Dooley about his humanitarian mission Operation Laos in the country of Laos. Dooley wrote about the "shaky beginnings" of his team's formation in the Laotian capital of Vientiane and the team's trips to Vang Vieng and Nam Tha, from which he had a "triumphant departure". James T. Fisher, who published a biography about Dooley, said, "The Edge of Tomorrow was even more successful than [Dooley's previous book] Deliver Us from Evil; a best-seller, it also won virtually universal critical acclaim." Seth Jacobs, writing in a chapter of Making Sense of the Vietnam Wars, said, "The Edge of Tomorrow and [Dooley's other book] The Night They Burned the Mountain, attracted almost as wide a readership as Dooley's debut." The United States Information Agency distributed The Edge of Tomorrow (along with Deliver Us from Evil) globally "as part of its cultural diplomacy efforts".

Fisher described the book, "The Edge of Tomorrow is both an American adventure story and a journal of the spirit that evokes the 'little way' of St. Thérèse of Lisieux... and other participants in the 'lay apostolate' of the era." According to the biographer, Dooley exhibited a "naive idealism" about foreign aid to Laos amidst "the yawning void of" Laos–United States relations in the 1950s. Dooley asked if foreign aid planners' inability to relate to his mission was due to "spiritual barrenness". The royalties from sales of The Edge of Tomorrow enabled Dooley to help his brothers financially.
