= The Ugly American =

1958 political novel by Eugene Burdick and William Lederer

- First edition cover
- Author: Eugene Burdick; William Lederer
- Language: English
- Genre: Political fiction
- Set in: Sarkhan
- Published: 1958 by Norton
- Publication place: United States
- Media type: Print
- Pages: 285 pp
- OCLC: 287560
- Dewey Decimal: 823.914
- LC Class: PS3562.E3

The Ugly American is a 1958 political novel by Eugene Burdick and William Lederer that depicts the failures of the U.S. diplomatic corps in Southeast Asia.

The book caused a sensation in diplomatic circles and had major political implications. The Peace Corps was established during the Kennedy administration partly as a result of the book. The bestseller has remained continuously in print and is one of the most influential American political novels. It has been called an "iconic Cold War text."

== Background ==
=== Authors ===
William Lederer was an American author and captain in the U.S. Navy who served as special assistant to the commander in chief of U.S. forces in the Pacific and Asian theater.

Eugene Burdick was an American political scientist, novelist, and non-fiction writer, and served in the Navy during World War II. The two met in the build-up to the Vietnam War.

The authors were disillusioned with the style and substance of U.S. diplomatic efforts in Southeast Asia. They sought to demonstrate through their writings their belief that American officials and civilians could make a substantial difference in Southeast Asian politics if they were willing to learn local languages, follow local customs and employ regional military tactics.

=== Historical and political ===
In 1958 the Cold War was in full force, pitting the two geopolitical giants, the United States and the Soviet Union, against each other for military and geopolitical influence and dominance. NATO and the Warsaw Pact divided Europe into two competing visions of the world: the Western world viewed countries in the Eastern Bloc as behind an Iron Curtain, as evidenced by the failed Hungarian Revolution. The Eastern Bloc countered by portraying itself as the liberator of countries that were still in thrall to colonialist machinations, as evidenced by banana republics. The nuclear arms race was underway with the U.S. well ahead initially, but by 1955, the Soviets had exploded a hydrogen bomb and were beginning to catch up, sparking fears of nuclear armageddon.

The Soviet launching of Sputnik into orbit in 1957 gave the Soviets a huge technological and propaganda victory and sparked a crisis of confidence in the United States and worries about falling behind technologically and militarily. In Asia, the French had left Indochina in 1954 after their defeat at the Battle of Dien Bien Phu and the U.S. became involved in Vietnam to fill the perceived power vacuum. The U.S. and the Soviets struggled for preeminence in the Third World through proxies in Latin America, Africa, and Asia.

In the Middle East, the U.S. feared the spread of Communism starting in Egypt and attempted to secure the region's most populous and politically powerful country for the West by guarantees of funding for construction of the Aswan Dam, but it was eventually the Soviets who prevailed. Soviet diplomatic and political successes in the Third World left the West worried about losing one country after another to Communism according to the domino theory invoked by President Dwight D. Eisenhower.

It was in this atmosphere of fear, mistrust, and uncertainty in the United States about Soviet military and technological might and Communist political success in unaligned nations of the Third World that the novel was published in 1958, with an immediate impact.

Lyman Kirkpatrick, Inspector General of the Central Intelligence Agency thought it wise to alert the Director of Central Intelligence to send a memo when the book was published and serialized by the Saturday Evening Post. The Foreign Service Journal, a monthly publication of the American Foreign Service Association, commented in the Editorial Page that "no thoughtful reader will be able to dismiss 'The Ugly American' lightly because, with all its errors and distortions, it still states candidly a problem which has long been debated within the Foreign Service itself."

== Content ==
The book depicts the failures of the U.S. diplomatic corps, whose insensitivity to local language, culture, and customs and refusal to integrate were in marked contrast to the polished abilities of Eastern Bloc (primarily Soviet) diplomacy and led to Communist diplomatic success overseas.

=== Literary structure ===
==== Title ====
The title of the novel is a play on Graham Greene's 1955 novel The Quiet American and was sometimes confused with it.

The "Ugly American" of the book title refers to the book's hero, plain-looking engineer Homer Atkins, whose "calloused and grease-blackened hands always reminded him that he was an ugly man." Atkins, who lives with the local people, comes to understand their needs, and offers genuinely useful assistance with small-scale projects such as the development of a simple bicycle-powered water pump.

==== Setting ====
The novel takes place in a fictional nation called Sarkhan (an imaginary country in Southeast Asia that somewhat resembles Laos, but which is meant to allude to Vietnam) and includes several real people, most of whose names have been changed. The book describes the United States' losing struggle against Communism because of the ineptitude and the bungling of the U.S. diplomatic corps stemming from innate arrogance and their failure to understand the local culture. The book implies that the Communists were successful because they practiced tactics similar to those of protagonist Homer Atkins.

==== Category and structure ====
The book is written as a series of interrelated vignettes. It was originally commissioned by the publisher as a work of nonfiction, but was changed to a fictionalized novel at an editor's suggestion. The authors say in the introduction that the work represents "the rendering of fact into fiction."

=== Plot summary ===
In one vignette, a Burmese journalist says, "For some reason, the [American] people I meet in my country are not the same as the ones I knew in the United States. A mysterious change seems to come over Americans when they go to a foreign land. They isolate themselves socially. They live pretentiously. They are loud and ostentatious."

The American Ambassador "Lucky" Lou Sears confines himself to his comfortable diplomatic compound in the capital. The Soviet ambassador speaks the local language and understands the local culture. He informs his Moscow superiors that Sears "keeps his people tied up with meetings, social events, and greeting and briefing the scores of senators, congressmen, generals, admirals, under secretaries of state and defense, and so on, who come pouring through here to 'look for themselves.'" Sears undermines the creative efforts to head off the communist insurgency.

=== Characters in real life ===
According to an article published in Newsweek in May 1959, the "real" "Ugly American" was identified as an International Cooperation Administration technician named Otto Hunerwadel, who, with his wife Helen, served in Burma from 1949 until his death in 1952. They lived in the villages, where they taught farming techniques, and helped to start home canning industries.

Another of the book's characters, Colonel Hillandale, appears to have been modeled on the real-life U.S. Air Force Major General Edward Lansdale, who was an expert in counter-guerrilla operations.

=== Popularity ===
The book was serialized in The Saturday Evening Post in the Fall of 1958, and came out as a Book of the Month Club selection in October.

The book became an instant bestseller, going through 20 printings from July to November 1958, remaining on the bestseller list for a year and a half, and ultimately selling four million copies. The book caused a sensation in diplomatic circles. John F. Kennedy was so impressed with the book that he sent a copy to each of his colleagues in the United States Senate. The book was one of the biggest bestsellers in the U.S., has been in print continuously since it appeared, and is one of the most politically influential novels in all of American literature.

After the book had gained wide readership, the term "Ugly American" came to be used to refer to the "loud and ostentatious" type of visitor in another country rather than the "plain looking folks, who are not afraid to 'get their hands dirty' like Homer Atkins" to whom the book itself referred.

=== Reviews ===
Given the mood of fear and uncertainty in the U.S. at the time due to Sputnik and other perceived failures in the struggles of the Cold War, a book about diplomatic failures in Southeast Asia was well-aligned with the Zeitgeist and primed to catch attention. The book was lavishly praised in the San Francisco Chronicle, The New York Times Book Review, and the Chicago Tribune, with reviewers adding their own anecdotes about boorish behavior on the part of Americans abroad. A reviewer in Catholic World linked it to The Quiet American and said that the book was trying to answer some of the questions raised by Greene's book.

Reviews in some news or opinion publications reflected the varying opinions extant during the Cold War public debate. A reviewer in Time called it a "crude series of black-and-white-cartoons" while the Saturday Review, and The Nation also disapproved of overly simplistic characters.

=== Impact ===
==== Contemporary reaction ====
The book was published in the waning days of the Eisenhower administration. Reportedly as a result of the book, Eisenhower ordered an investigation of the U.S. foreign aid program. As the presidential campaign of 1960 heated up, the issues raised in the book became a campaign issue for the Democratic Party.

==== Presidential politics ====
Lasting impacts in the Kennedy administration included President Kennedy's national physical fitness program, his statement of America's willingness to "bear any burden" in the Third World, the founding of the Peace Corps, the build-up of American Special Forces, and emphasis on counterinsurgency tactics in fighting communists in South Vietnam. According to British documentary film maker Adam Curtis, Senator and future U.S. President "John F. Kennedy was gripped by The Ugly American. In 1960, he and five other opinion leaders bought a large advertisement in The New York Times, saying that they had sent copies of the novel to every U.S. senator because its message was so important."

President Lyndon Baines Johnson made reference to the term Ugly American in his Great Society speech to a 1964 university graduating class, and it was by then used as a pejorative expression for generally offensive behavior by Americans abroad.

==== Peace Corps ====
Senator Hubert Humphrey first introduced a bill in Congress in 1957 for the formation of a Peace Corps aimed primarily at development in the Third World, but "it did not meet with much enthusiasm" and the effort failed. The Ugly American was published the following year. Senator Kennedy first mentioned the idea of creating a Peace Corps during his campaign for president in 1960 and in March 1961, two months after his inauguration, Kennedy announced the establishment of the Peace Corps. Kennedy and other members of the administration viewed the Peace Corps as their answer to the problems described in The Ugly American.

==== Criticism ====
Presidents, Senators, and Congressmen alluded to the book or quoted from it, either as commentary or to further their objectives, or to criticize it. Senator J. William Fulbright, powerful chairman of the Foreign Relations Committee, criticized the book from the Senate floor, declaring that it contained "phony" claims of incompetence, and that it was a follow-up to McCarthy era treason charges. Historian Daniel Immerwahr wrote that the book promoted the idea that Americans, if they conducted themselves properly, could solve the problems of the Third World.

==== Long-term impact ====
The title entered the English language for a type of character portrayed in the book. The book is one of a very few works of fiction that had a profound and lasting impact on American political debate, along with such works as Uncle Tom's Cabin and The Jungle.

In 2009 an article appeared in The New York Times Book Review about the book's impact since it was first published. The reviewer wrote that "the book's enduring resonance may say less about its literary merits than about its failure to change American attitudes. Today, as the battle for hearts and minds has shifted to the Middle East, we still can't speak Sarkhanese."

A 2011 book on Arab–American relations took its title in part from the book, recalled the sense of diplomatic bungling in Southeast Asia portrayed in the book, and pointed out that many Arab commentators likened American mistakes in Iraq to those in Southeast Asia.

== Related works ==
Lederer and Burdick later published a 1965 novel called Sarkhan, about the Communist threat and Washington politics in Southeast Asia. After thousands of copies which had been available in bookstores seemed to disappear from the shelves, the authors became convinced that government agencies were behind an attempt to suppress the book. After a decade of unavailability, it was republished in 1977 under the title The Deceptive American.

== 1963 film ==
The film version of the novel was made in 1963 and starred Marlon Brando as Ambassador Harrison Carter MacWhite. The Ugly American received mixed reviews and did poorly at the box office.

== See also ==
- Ugly American (pejorative)
