= William Lederer =

American novelist

- Born: March 31, 1912; New York City, U.S.
- Died: December 5, 2009 (aged 97); Baltimore, Maryland, U.S.
- Occupation: American author
- Spouse(s): Ethel Hackett (1940–1965) (3 children); Corinne Lewis (1965–1976)
- Children: W. Jonathan Lederer; Brian J. H. Lederer; Bruce Allen Lederer

William Julius Lederer Jr. (March 31, 1912 – December 5, 2009) was an American writer and naval officer, best known as the co-author of the influential 1958 novel The Ugly American.

== Biography ==
=== U.S. Navy service ===
After dropping out of high school, Lederer enlisted in the United States Navy in 1930. He graduated from the United States Naval Academy in 1936. His first appointment was as the junior officer aboard USS Tutuila (PR-4), a river gunboat of the Yangtze Patrol on the Yangtze River in China. After the entry of the United States into World War II in December 1941, he was a line officer first in Asia and then in the European Theater, serving as a ship's navigation officer in the 1943 Allied invasion of Sicily. He spent the later years of his naval service as a public information officer, and in that capacity eventually was posted to The Pentagon and later as special assistant to Commander-in-Chief, Pacific, Admiral Felix Stump at Pearl Harbor, Territory of Hawaii. He rose to the rank of captain.

=== Writing career ===
Lederer's best-selling work, 1958's The Ugly American, was one of two novels he co-wrote with Eugene Burdick, a former U.S. Navy lieutenant commander and political scientist at UC Berkeley. Disillusioned with the United States's diplomatic efforts in Southeast Asia, Lederer and Burdick sought to demonstrate that American officials and civilians could make a substantial difference in Southeast Asian politics if they were willing to learn local languages, follow local customs, and use regional military tactics. They were concerned that if American policy makers continued to ignore the logic behind these lessons, Southeast Asia would fall under Soviet or Chinese Communist influence. In the book's epilogue, they argue for the creation of "a small force of well-trained, well-chosen, hard-working and dedicated professionals" fluent in the local language, which presaged the Peace Corps, which John F. Kennedy proposed in 1960.

In A Nation of Sheep (1961), Lederer identifies intelligence failures in Asia. In "Government by Misinformation," he investigates the sources that he believes lead to American foreign policy, namely trusted local officials; local (foreign) newspapers, magazines, books, radio broadcasts, etc.; paid local informers; personal observations by U.S. officials; and American journalists.

In Our Own Worst Enemy (1968), Lederer relates that as a young U.S. Navy lieutenant (junior grade) in 1940, he had a chance meeting with a Jesuit priest, Father Pierre Cogny, and his Vietnamese assistant, "Mr. Nguyen," while he was waiting out a Japanese bombing raid in China. Father Pierre asked Lederer if he had a copy of the United States Declaration of Independence on his gunboat, and Lederer said that he did and provided them with a copy. "Mr. Nguyen" was eager to deliver the document to "Tong Van So," who later became known as Ho Chi Minh, the Vietnamese Communist revolutionary and statesman. The 1945 Proclamation of Independence of the Democratic Republic of Vietnam, written by Ho, begins by quoting from the American document. Ho went on to serve as prime minister (1946–1955) and president (1945–1969) of the Democratic Republic of Vietnam (i.e., North Vietnam). Our Own Worst Enemy describes how the United States supported a corrupt President Ngo Diem in South Vietnam, ignored massive black market selling of stolen U.S. military supplies, food, and foreign aid, and refused to stand up to corrupt local officials who stole donated food and supplies, took kickbacks, and bullied their own population, as Americans continued saying, "It's their country, and we Americans are only guests here."

Other Lederer works were intended to be light-hearted and humorous fantasies. His early works, All the Ships at Sea (1950) and Ensign O'Toole and Me (1957) are both. A children's book, Timothy's Song, with illustrations by Edward Ardizzone, appeared in 1965.

=== Television and film ===
Two of his 1949 short stories published in Reader's Digest I Taught My Wife to Keep House the Navy Way and The Skipper Surprised His Wife were filmed in 1950 as The Skipper Surprised His Wife/

The television series Ensign O'Toole, a situation comedy which starred Dean Jones and aired on NBC from 1962 to 1963, was based on All the Ships at Sea and Ensign O'Toole and Me and depicted the misadventures of the crew of the fictional U.S. Navy destroyer USS Appleby in the early 1960s. Lederer served as technical adviser for the series.

He co-wrote the screenplay of the 1965 feature film McHale's Navy Joins the Air Force.

=== Death ===
Lederer died of respiratory failure on December 5, 2009, at the age of 97.

== Eugene Burdick collaborations ==
- The Ugly American, 1958 (co-author, with Eugene Burdick)
- Sarkhan: a Novel, republished under the title The Deceptive American in 1977.

== Selected works ==
- All the Ships at Sea, 1950 (author)
- The Last Cruise; the story of the sinking of the submarine, USS Cochino, 1950 (author)
- Spare-Time Article Writing for Money (1954)
- Ensign O'Toole and Me, 1957 (author)
- A Nation of Sheep, 1961 (author)
- McHale's Navy Joins the Air Force, 1965 (co-screenwriter)
- Timothy's Song, 1965 (author)
- The Story of Pink Jade, 1966 (author)
- Our Own Worst Enemy, 1968 (author)
- The Anguished American, 1968 (author)
- The Mirages of Marriage, 1968 (co-author with Don D. Jackson)
- Complete Cross-Country Skiing and Ski Touring, 1970 (co-author with Joseph Peter Wilson)
- Marital Choices: Forecasting, Assessing, and Improving a Relationship, 1981 (author)
- A Happy Book of Happy Stories, 1981 (author)
- New Complete Book of Cross Country Skiing, 1983 (author)
- I, Giorghos, 1984 (author)
- Creating a Good Relationship, 1984 (author)
