= Saint Louis University Office of Admissions Building =

Stone castle building in St. Louis, Missouri

Coordinates: 38°38′16.5″N 90°14′15″W

Saint Louis University's New Student Visit Center (as known as The Alexander Euston Mansion and Queen's Daughters House) is a stone castle building located at 3730 Lindell in St. Louis, Missouri. This mansion was built in 1890 by English immigrant Alexander Euston who made money in the white lead and linseed oil business. It was built to include sixteen rooms and a ballroom.

In 1912, the St. Louis-based religious society Daughters of the Queen of Heaven, an organization of lay Catholic women, purchased this building and converted it to a boarding house for single women. It functioned as a woman's home until 1972. The Church of Scientology owned the building between 1974 and 1985. In 1988, Saint Louis University acquired the mansion and converted it to become an annex to its law school, previously housed in the adjacent Morrissey Hall. However, in the mid-2010s, the law school was relocated to downtown St. Louis to Scott Hall. Queen's Daughters Hall was renovated to become SLU's New Student Visit Center as part of the Office of Admission. The building is one of the best remaining examples of Romanesque Revival architecture left in the city of St. Louis. Another house of Romanesque architectural style on the campus of Saint Louis University would be Samuel Cupples House.
