= Ramli =

Ramli is a surname. Notable people with the surname include:

- Khayr al-Din al-Ramli, Islamic jurist
- Mohd Hatta Ramli, Malaysian politician
- Mohd Zamri Ramli, Malaysian footballer
- Muhsin al-Ramli, Iraqi writer
- Rizal Ramli, Indonesian politician
- Intesar al-Ramli, Iraqi scientist (Dr.)
