= Samuel Cupples =

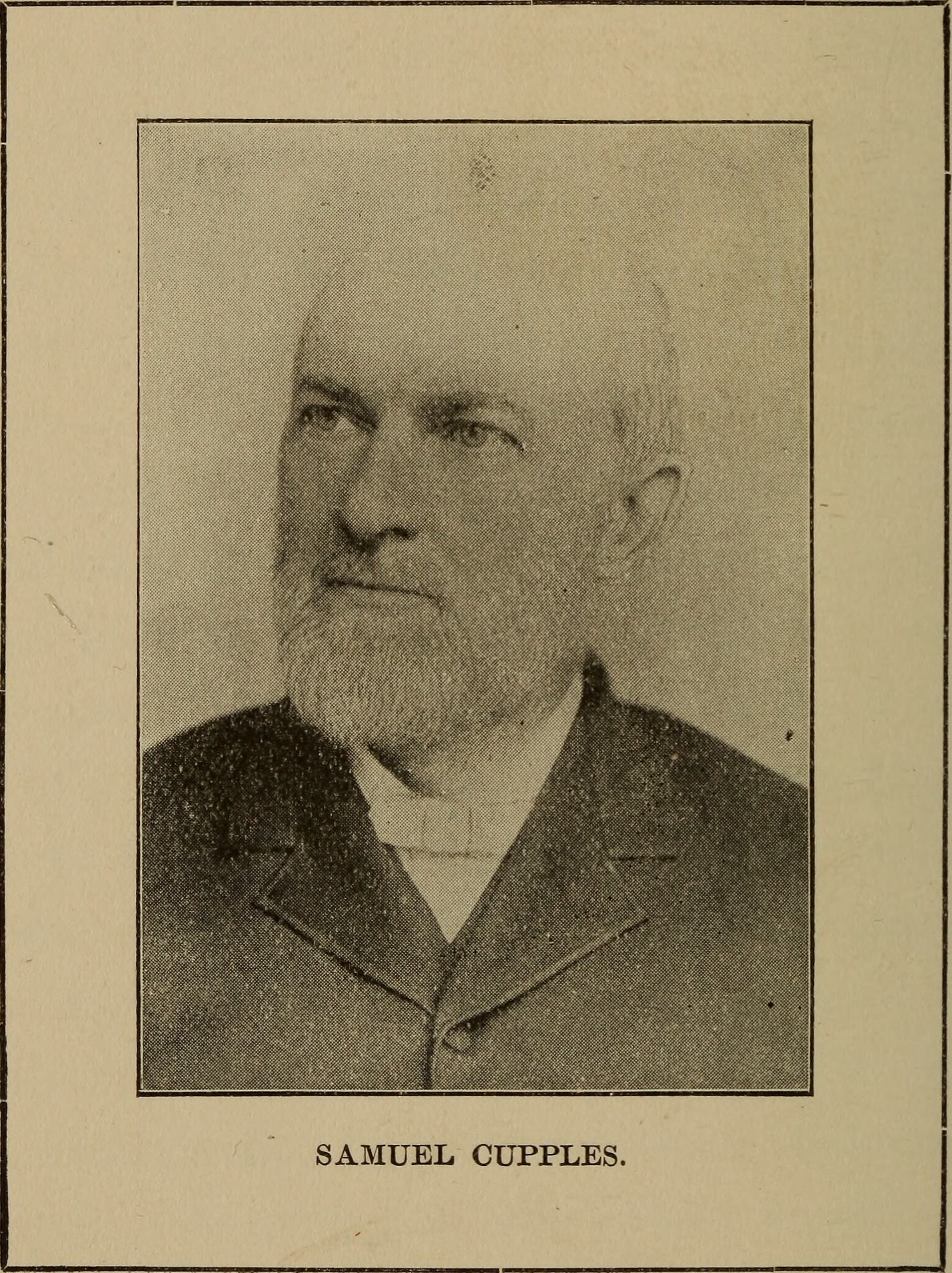
- Born: September 13, 1831; Harrisburg, Pennsylvania
- Died: January 6, 1912 (aged 80)

Samuel Cupples (September 13, 1831 – January 6, 1912) was an American businessman and entrepreneur based in St. Louis, Missouri.

== Early life ==
Cupples was born in Harrisburg, Pennsylvania, to James and Elizabeth (Bingham) Cupples. His parents were both from County Down, Ireland, and came to the United States in 1814. James Cupples was an educator and established a school in Pittsburgh, Pennsylvania. When he was 15, Samuel moved to Cincinnati and began working for Albert O. Taylor in a woodenware business.

== Business career ==
Cupples moved to St. Louis, Missouri, in 1851 and established his own woodenware business under the name of Samuel Cupples & Company. In 1858, Cupples partnered with Thomas Marston, and the business became Cupples & Marston. The business was very successful, but the partnership was dissolved twelve years later. Cupples gained new partners in H. G. and Robert S. Brookings and A. A. Wallace, and the business became known as Samuel Cupples & Company again. With the Brookings brothers, Cupples enlarged his company to enormous proportions. The company was reorganized in 1883 and was again renamed to Samuel Cupples Woodenware Company. Cupples became president of that firm, which was the largest of its kind in the country.

Samuel also built the St. Louis Terminal Cupples Station & Property Company, known as "Cupples Station". a most valuable asset to St. Louis merchants. The station was a business center created at a junction where almost all railroads in St. Louis intersected. On this land a system of warehouses was erected, and the railroads could traverse it through tracks in the warehouse basements. St. Louis merchants could then receive and reship goods in one place, and the expense of handling goods was significantly diminished. The station was gifted to Washington University by Cupples and Robert S. Brookings. Cupples also established the Samuel Cupples Envelope Company.

In 1900, Cupples, with the agreement of Brookings, turned all company assets, totaling $4 million, over to Washington University in addition to funds for the construction of three new buildings on the university's campus: Cupples I Hall, Cupples II Hall and the Cupples Engineering Building, the latter of which was demolished in 1967 to make room for Bryan Hall. Cupples also served on the board of directors at Washington University in St. Louis. Samuel was also a millionaire by thirty.

In 1888, he built his residential home on West Pine Boulevard, Cupples House, the cost totaling $500,000, which now would approximately equal $15 to 20 million dollars. The home is now on the United States National Register of Historic Places and has been made into a museum located on the Saint Louis University campus, at 3671 West Pine Boulevard.

== Personal life ==
Samuel Cupples married Margaret Amelia Kells on February 15, 1854, and had a child which died at birth. Margaret died of tuberculosis in 1859. Cupples then married her sister, reportedly on his first wife's wish, Martha Sophia Kells, in 1860. They had three daughters, all of whom died in childhood: Harriet Lillian (“Lillie”) Kells Cupples (born December 8, 1866, died 1874), Belle Marston Cupples (born October 28, 1869, died 1879), and Clara Taylor Cupples (born August 28, 1871, died 1874).

The loss of his own children caused Cupples to adopt Amelia Ross Lowman, daughter of his sister-in-law, Harriet Jane (Kells) Lowman (1828–1877), in 1871.

Cupples, his daughter, Amelia Lowman Scudder, and Amelia's daughters Martha, Gladys and Maude, set out for a Mediterranean voyage with planned destinations of Jerusalem and the great pyramids of Egypt aboard the British ocean liner RMS Republic on January 22, 1909, in New York City. The ship was in collision with a west-bound liner early the next morning in heavy fog, and sank. The Cupples family survived.
