= Pius XII Memorial Library =

Saint Louis University Pius XII Memorial Library

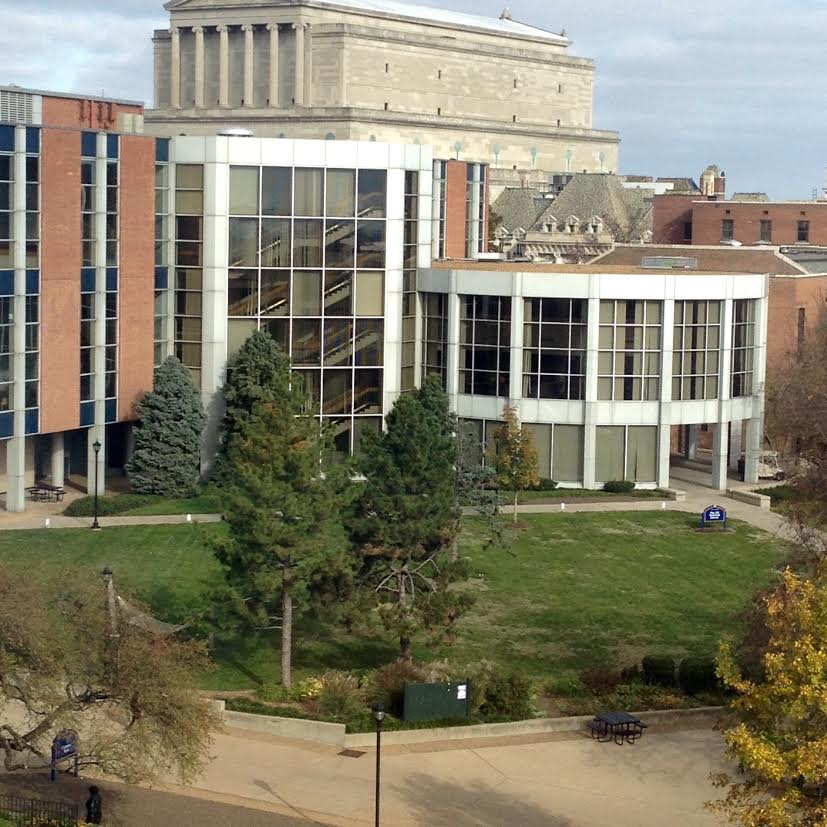
- 38.6368°N 90.2350°W
- Location: 3650 Lindell Blvd. St. Louis MO 63108
- Type: Academic Library
- Established: 1959; 67 years ago

Other information
- Director: David Cassens
- Website: http://libraries.slu.edu

Pius XII Memorial Library is an academic library located on the Saint Louis University north campus. Named after Pope Pius XII and built in 1959, it occupies 215,000 square feet and houses over 1.3 million volumes, including more than 30,000 rare books. It is the home of the Knights of Columbus Vatican Film Library.

== General ==
Pius XII Memorial Library works to collect and maintain past and present ideas and issues. The collection of information available at the library aims to demonstrate the Jesuit mission of the pursuit of knowledge. To achieve this part of the mission, Pius XII Memorial Library works to implement technology to gather and preserve information from its own collection and from other libraries and sources around the world. It aims to provide digital and physical places for students and faculty to find information at Saint Louis University.

== Technology ==
There are 87 public computers available and wireless access throughout the building. Students may print on one of four printers using Billiken Bucks, which can be loaded onto a students account online. To find online sources, students can use SLUth Search Plus on the library's website. This feature searches through all of the materials that Pius has access to, both in the library and in online databases.

In November 2017, the Academic Technology Commons (ATC) on the ground floor of the library was opened, providing the student body with access to newly developed technologies such as 3D printing and robotic equipment. In the near future, the library plans to continue remodeling the library to provide for the latest technological needs of SLU students.

Another resource available online to students is the Ask-A-Librarian online instant messaging. During library hours, librarians respond to questions regarding research or finding materials. Texting is another method to ask a librarian questions.

== Services ==
=== Interlibrary Loan ===
Pius has the ability to offer students resources that the library does not have through an interlibrary loan program called ILLiad. Through an online account, one may use ILLiad to place, track, and keep a history of loan requests. One may also use ILLiad to access electronic copies of articles as PDFs.

Another interlibrary loan service Pius uses is MOBIUS, the Missouri Bibliographic Information User System. This service allows students to gain access to books in Missouri that are not presently available in Pius library.

=== University Writing Services ===
University Writing Services (UWS) has peer consultation appointments located in the library. The goal of the program is to advance students' writing through peer review, writing groups, and workshops.

Pius offers writing services to both undergraduates and graduates by appointment.

=== Research Assistant Program ===
The Research Assistance Program (RAP) aids in identifying and using library resources for research needs. Pius offers research assistance and strategies through the help of research librarians. Undergraduate students, graduate students, faculty, and staff who are working on research projects are able to make appointments with research librarians online.

=== Vatican Film Library ===
Pius XII Library also houses the Knights of Columbus Vatican Film Library, established in 1953 with help from the Knights of Columbus. It is unique to SLU and the only other collection is in Rome. This collection is the only one in the Western Hemisphere for Vatican Microfilm Collection. It contains more than 37,000 microfilmed manuscripts from the Biblioteca Apostolica Vaticana. Among its outstanding manuscripts are some of the oldest copies of the Bible in Greek, the works of Virgil, illuminated manuscripts of Dante, works of medieval philosophers, theologians, historians, classical Latin and Greek authors, and Renaissance humanists.

=== Citation Guides ===
Pius also offers access to citation guides to help cite sources in AMA, APA, Chicago, Legal, MLA, and Turabian styles. These style guides are available in all of the University libraries.

== Events ==
The library holds numerous events and exhibitions throughout the year. During finals week, the College of Arts and Sciences brings therapy dogs to the library to help reduce students’ stress levels and give them a study break.

The library also hosts educational talks and conferences for students and community members. On occasion, it also hosts book signing events.

Past events in 2013 included an exhibition on The Ballets Russes in 2013 and a guest lecture and discussion about the St. Louis Exorcism of 1949. The Vatican Film Library hosts a medieval and Renaissance manuscript studies conference every year. From spring 2019 to spring 2020, the library hosted an exhibit showcasing various American Civil War artifacts and stories.

== Social media ==
Pius uses social media including Twitter, Facebook, Pinterest and Instagram to inform students about events and activities the library offers.
