= The President's Gardens =

2012 novel by Muhsin al-Ramli

First edition (publ. دار ثقافة)

The President's Gardens is a novel written by the Iraqi author Muhsin al-Ramli. It was longlisted for the International Prize for Arabic Fiction (IPAF), known as the "Arabic Booker", in 2013. Set during the last fifty years of Iraqi history, this novel tells the story of three friends, exploring how ordinary people have been affected by historic events such as wars, the blockade of Iraq and the invasion of Kuwait. It examines the gap between the lifestyle of those in power and ordinary citizens. During the chaos of occupation, one of them loses his life, like so many caught between loyalists of the old and new regimes. The President's Gardens helps the reader understand the complexities of the successive tragedies besetting the ‘land between two rivers’. The gripping story is told with humanity, and life is somehow the victor despite all the obstacles.

It is followed up by Daughter of the Tigris (2019).
