= Knights of Columbus Vatican Film Library =

Library

Coordinates: 38.6367°N 90.2352°W

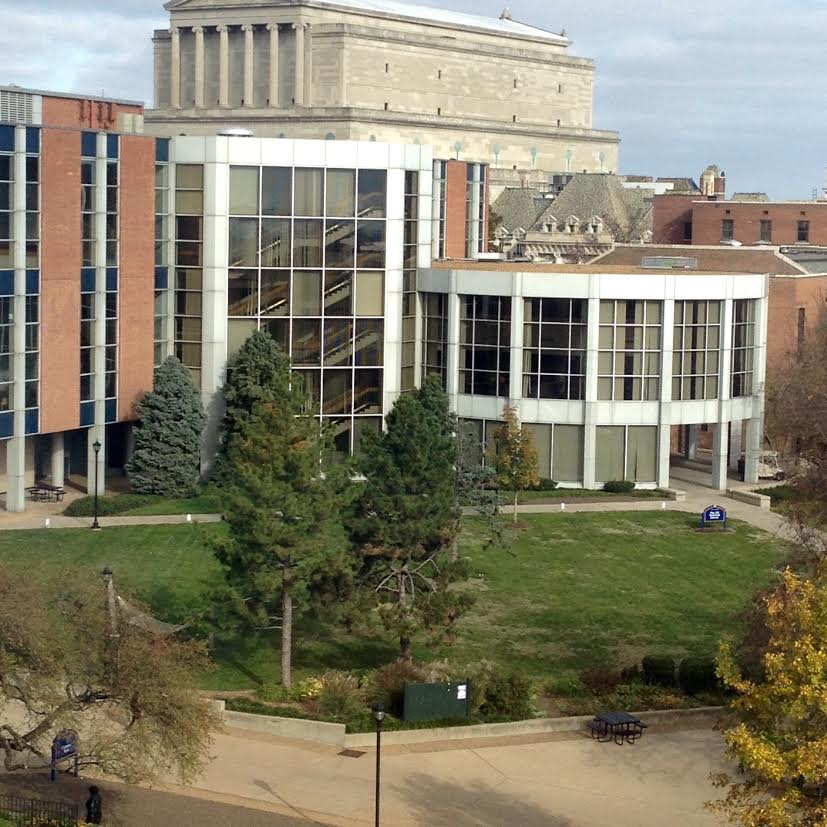
The Knights of Columbus Vatican Film Library is located in the Pius XII Memorial Library (shown) on the campus of Saint Louis University.

The Knights of Columbus Vatican Film Library in St. Louis, Missouri is the only collection, outside the Vatican itself, of microfilms of more than 37,000 works from the Biblioteca Apostolica Vaticana, the Vatican Library in Europe. It is located in the Pius XII Memorial Library on the campus of Saint Louis University.

== History ==
The Library was created by Lowrie J. Daly (1914–2000), with funding from the Knights of Columbus. The goal was to make Vatican and other documents more available to researchers in North America.

Microfilming of Vatican manuscripts began in 1951, and according to the Library's website, was the largest microfilming project that had been undertaken up to that date. From 1951 to 1957, twelve million manuscript pages were recorded, from 30,000 different works. This represents approximately 75% of the manuscripts available in the targeted language groups. Other microfilm projects in the 1950s included Jesuit archival material from Rome, archives in both North America and South America, and the Philippines.

The Library opened in 1953, and moved to the St. Louis University campus, in the Pius XII Memorial Library, in 1959. The first librarian was Charles J. Ermatinger, who served until 2000.

As of 2007, the Library has microfilmed versions of over 37,000 manuscripts, with material in Greek, Latin, Arabic, Hebrew and Ethiopic, as well as several more common Western European languages. There are reproductions of many works from the Biblioteca Palatina and Biblioteca Cicognara at the Vatican, as well as Papal letter registers from the Archivio Segreto Vaticano (Vatican Secret Archives) from the 9th to 16th centuries, in the series Registra Vaticana and Registra Supplicationium.

The Film Library also collects manuscript catalogs and handwritten inventories of Vatican Library manuscripts, as well as those of other libraries, including a collection of microfilmed copies of over 2,500 medieval and renaissance manuscripts from other libraries, over 20,000 incunabula (early printed books), and 52,000 color slides of illuminated manuscripts.

The collection also includes many hardcopy works on the subjects of palaeography, codicology, illumination, and other topics related to manuscript studies.

== Conference ==
The Library hosts an annual conference on Manuscript Studies, which is held in St. Louis in mid-October.

== Journal ==
Manuscripta is a biannual academic journal published by the library. Established in 1957, it covers topics related to the study of medieval and renaissance manuscripts. The journal is printed and distributed by Brepols Publishers and is edited by Gregory Pass.
