= The Bather (Mauro) =

Coordinates: 38°38′11″N 90°13′56″W

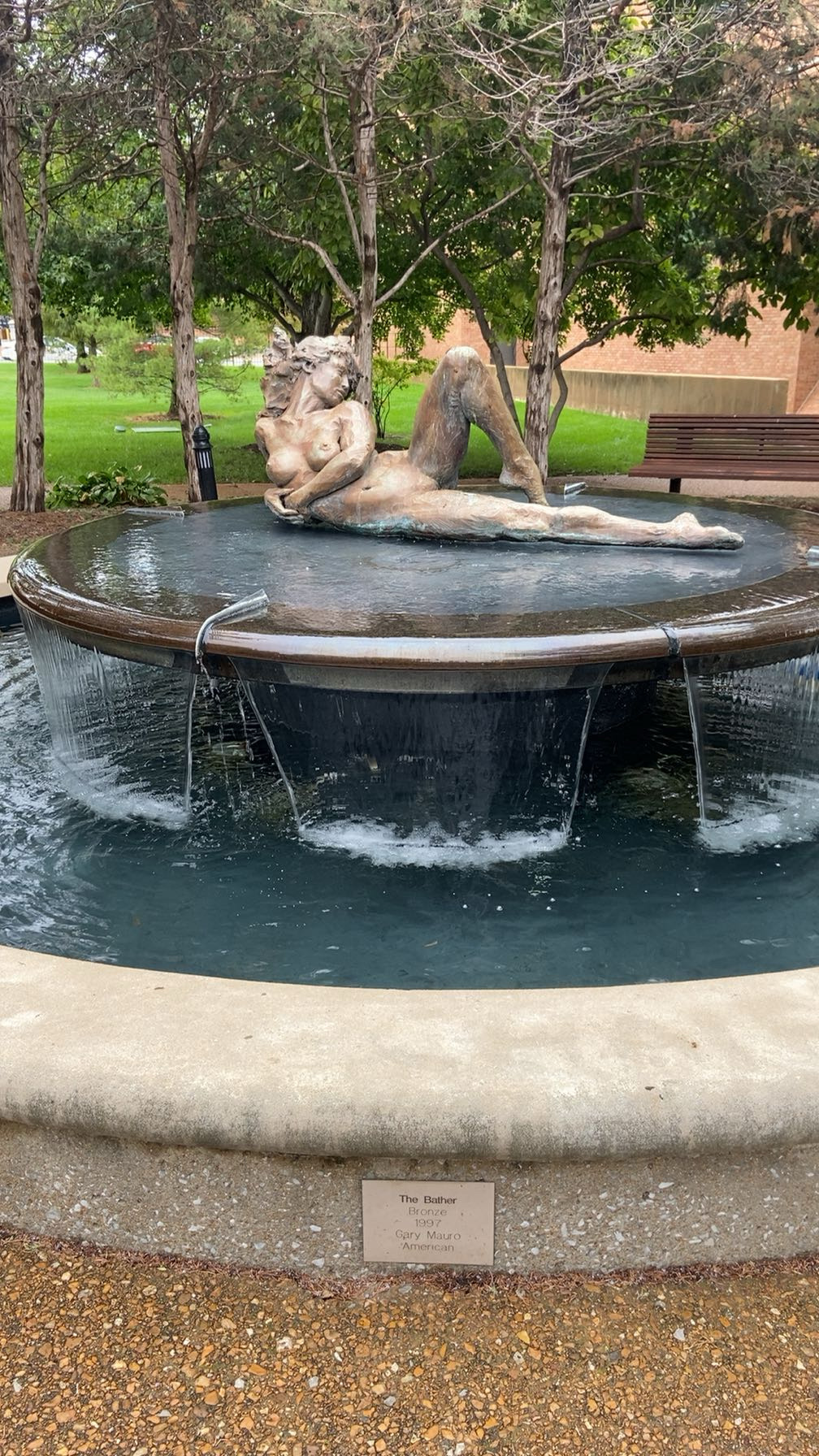
The Bather, a bronze sculpture depicting a nude woman in an open pose, in its current location on the Saint Louis University Campus. The statue’s water is turned on. The plaque and shrubbery are visible.

The Bather, also known as Sluzie In the Jacuzzi or The Floozie in the Jacuzzi, is a bronze sculpture by Gary Mauro, measuring at 77 inches (6 feet 5 inches or 1.9558 m) in length, located on the campus of Saint Louis University, Midtown, Missouri, along the pathway between Ritter Hall and Tegler Hall.

== Description ==
The sculpture depicts a fully nude, toned, female figure stretched out in a pool of falling water. The figure's pose was made to resemble that of Michelangelo's work depicting God on the Sistine Chapel ceiling. The surface's rough texture was inspired by Auguste Rodin's finishing technique. The sculpture was completed in 1997. It was then bought by the University's president at the time, president Lawrence H. Biondi for $35200. Originally, the sculpture was intended to be a 13″ Marquette called Tara Reclining before a prominent art collector encouraged Mauro to create what is known today as The Bather.

== About the artist ==
Gary Mauro (1944–2021) was born in Walsenburg, Colorado before later residing in New York City and Santa Fe. Mauro studied at the University of Oklahoma and later at the University of Colorado Art school

His artistic expression was heavily influenced by his southwest identity, his friendship with modernist Willem de Kooning and artist Richard Diebenkorn. His subject matter heavily focused on the "idealization of the female body".

Mauro has other artworks on display in the university's Pere Marquette Gallery in DuBourg Hall.

== Purchase of the statue ==
Mauro was honored at president Biondi's admiration for his work and his consideration for the purchase of one of his sculptures, so much so that he offered St Louis University a substantial discount of 30% on three sculpture options. The options included: The Bather, Nouvella, and S. Theresa.

Seemingly, the original purchase only included Nouvella, but The bather was later added on per president Biondi's request.

== Reception ==
=== Bare Naked Statues ===
The name of Bare Naked Statues, SLU's all-male a Capella group, was heavily influenced by the frisbee games of the founding members around the statue. These frisbee games would take place between The Bather and another naked statue on the university campus. "Sluzie in the Jacuzzi was one of the honorary players" Rob Turner, one of the founding members of BNS, '04, recollects.

=== Public opinion ===
Many members of the Saint Louis community, students and faculty alike, feel as though the statue is out-of-place on the very Catholic-Jesuit university campus. Many go as far as to describe the statue as "tacky", "lacks artistic merit", and is "disrespectful" due to the nature of the statues nakedness, posture and pose, and location. Many students and faculty disagreed with president Biondi's choice of artworks on campus and his artistic envision for the university, these critiques extend to The Bather. While others can appreciate her outlier-ed nature among the very religious depiction of women, mainly that of The Virgin Mary, found around campus. Regardless, many agree with the statue's craftsmanship.
