= Muhsin al-Ramli =

Iraqi writer (born 1967)

Muhsin Al-Ramli
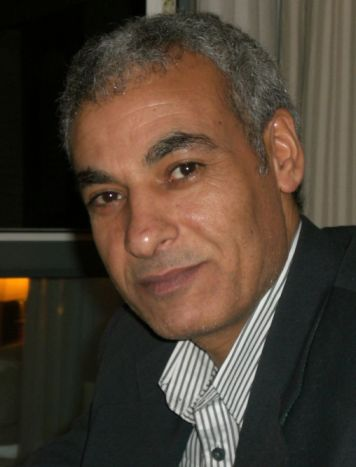
- Born: Muhsin Al-Ramli; March 7, 1967 (age 59); Sedira, Iraqi Republic
- Education: Autonomous University of Madrid
- Occupations: writer poet translator academic
- Writing career
- Language: Arabic; Spanish; English
- Notable works: Scattered Crumbs; Fingers of Dates; We Are All Widowers of the Answers
- Website: muhsinalramli.blogspot.com

Muhsin Al-Ramli (Arabic: محسن الرملي, officially known as Muhisin Mutlak Rodhan; born 7 March 1967) is an expatriate Iraqi writer living in Madrid, Spain since 1995. He is a translator of several Spanish classics to Arabic. He produced the complete translation of Don Quixote from Spanish to Arabic. He teaches at the Saint Louis University Madrid Campus. He is the current editor of Alwah, a magazine of Arabic literature and thought, which he co-founded.

== Early life and education ==
In 2003, he earned a Doctorate in Philosophy and Letters and Spanish Philology from the Autonomous University of Madrid. His thesis topic was The Imprint of Islamic Culture in Don Quixote. He is the brother of the writer and poet Hassan Mutlak.

== Published works ==
- Gift from the Century to Come (Short stories) 1995
- In Search of a Live Heart (Theater) 1997
- Papers far from the Tigris (Short stories) 1998
- Scattered Crumbs (Novel) 2000
- The Happy Nights of the Bombing (Narrative) 2003
- We Are All Widowers of the Answers (Poetry) 2005
- Dates on My Fingers (Novel) 2008
- Asleep among the Soldiers (Poetry) 2011
- The Oranges Of Baghdad and Chinese Love (Short stories) 2011
- The President's Gardens (Novel) 2012
- The wolf of love and books (Novel) 2015
- Children and Shoes (Novel) 2018
- Daughter of the Tigris (Novel) 2019

== Translations ==
1. Laranjas e giletes em Bagdá/Naranjas y cuchillas en Bagdad, Fedra Rodríguez Hinojosa (Trans.), (n.t.) Revista Literária em Tradução, nº 1 (set/2010), Fpolis/Brasil, ISSN 2177-5141
