= Dabada =

1988 novel by Hassan Matlik

- Author: Hassan Matlik
- Language: Arabic
- Publication date: 1988
- Publication place: Iraq
- Pages: 220
- ISBN: 9953-29-278-7

Dabada (Arabic" دابادا) is the first and most famous novel by the Iraqi writer Hassan Mutlak, It consists of 220 pages and its first edition was published by the Arab House of encyclopedias in Beirut in 1988. The second edition was published by the Egyptian General Book Authority in Cairo in 2001, the third edition was published by the Arab House of Sciences publishers in Beirut 2006, and the new edition by Dar Al-Mada.

== Description ==
Some consider it to be the most important Iraqi novel that was published at the end of the twentieth century. It is a different novel by all specifications; It came as a single text rather than divided into chapters. It touches human concerns.

== Criticism ==
- "It is an unusual novel, It is new and its author is a brave young man," Jabra Ibrahim Jabra.
- The novelist Abdul Rahman al-Rubaie said: "I loved this disobedient novel, it is a different novel, it cannot remind us of any other work of fiction, and it has not been based on a previous novel achievement. It's a lonely novel and it's independent of what it carried".
- "Dabada is writing according to the terms of life, “said Qasim Mahmud Jandari.
- The critic Dr. Abdullah Ibrahim: "it is a novel that excites the reader, and it deals with major issues, this novel will raise problems in the level of reading and the level of interpretation and opinions will differ about it".
- The poet Salah Hassan said: "it is the only Iraqi novel that has emerged with such distinctive features. Dabada is truly an outstanding Iraqi novel, and it is undeniably innovative on both the structural and substantive levels, as it enables it to stand alongside the great novels".
- The critic Dr.Bassel Al-shikhli: "this novel goes beyond the limits of realism to enter into a larger and broader problem than the stereotype of persuasive writing. The language of dapada is the secret of its power."
- "I hope everyone will read (Dabada) by the very international writer Hassan Mutlak". The storyteller Karim Shaalan said.
- The poet and storyteller Abdul Hadi Saadoun said: "dabada has influenced a whole generation of young Iraqi writers, and the texts that have emerged since. He suggested that reading the new Iraqi novel should be started starting from the date of publication of dapada, as it is a bright point that cannot be crossed, “he said.
- Ahmed al-Dosari described it as "a sharp fracture of the skull of the novel, Hassan Mutlak broke pyramids, whose visit became a sacred duty for the writers of the novel, conquering the plot and suspending the dramatic growth."
- Mahmoud Jandari considered it: "it represents writing on the terms of life".

== Content ==
The novel contains five tales:

- For the first story: the mysterious disappearance of father Mahmoud.
- The second tale: the symbolism of the dog Sharar.
- The third story: the symbolism of Abdul-Majid's death by the poison of mice
- The fourth tale: the symbolism of Qundis’s donkey.
- The fifth story: the symbolism of Shahin's disappearance.
