= Scattered Crumbs =

Novel by Muhsin al-Ramli

Scattered Crumbs: is a novel written by the Iraqi author Muhsin al-Ramli.

Al-Ramli's first novel, Scattered Crumbs (al-Fatit al-mubaʿthar), was published in Arabic in 2000, and its 2003 English translation received the Arabic Translation Award from the University of Arkansas Press.

Set in an Iraqi village during the Iran-Iraq war, Scattered Crumbs critiques a totalitarian dictatorship through the stories of an impoverished peasant family. A father, a fierce supporter of Saddam Hussein clashes with his artist son, who loves his homeland but finds himself literally unable to paint the Leader's portrait for his father's wall.
