= Hassan Mutlak =

Iraqi writer

Mutlak

Hassan Mutlak (Arabic: حسن مطلك) (1961–1990) was an Iraqi writer, painter, and poet, who was hanged in 1990 at the age of 29 for an attempted coup d'état. He was considered among the intellectuals of his country to be the Federico García Lorca of Iraq. He is the brother of the writer and poet Muhsin al-Ramli.

He was one of nine children, having three brothers and five sisters.

== Published works ==
- Dabada (novel)
- The power of laughter in Ura (novel)
- Love is running on a wall (short stories)
- Alfa-Hassan-beto (short stories)
- The book of love ... the shadows of them on the ground (memory of Love)
- The eye in (daily)
- The writing stands (Test)
- The masks... You, the homeland and I (Poetry)
