= Saint Louis University =

Private university in St. Louis, Missouri, US

- Latin: Universitas Sancti Ludovici
- Former names: Saint Louis Academy (1818–1820); Saint Louis College (1820)
- Motto: Ad maiorem Dei gloriam (Latin)
- Motto in English: "For the greater glory of God"
- Type: Private research university
- Established: November 16, 1818; 207 years ago
- Founder: Louis William Valentine DuBourg
- Accreditation: HLC
- Religious affiliation: Catholic (Jesuit)
- Academic affiliations: ACCU; AJCU; Space-grant
- Endowment: $2.02 billion (2025)
- President: Edward J. Feser
- Provost: Michael Lewis
- Faculty: 2,022
- Administrative staff: 6,000
- Students: 15,334 (fall 2024)
- Undergraduates: 8,669 (fall 2024)
- Postgraduates: 6,665 (fall 2024)
- Location: St. Louis, Missouri, U.S. 38°38′11″N 90°14′03″W
- Campus: 273 acres (110.5 ha); Large city
- Other campuses: Madrid
- Newspaper: The University News
- Colors: Blue and white
- Nickname: Billikens
- Sporting affiliations: NCAA Division I – A-10
- Website: www.slu.edu

Saint Louis University (SLU) is a private Jesuit research university in St. Louis, Missouri, United States. Founded in 1818 by Louis William Valentine DuBourg, it is the oldest university west of the Mississippi River and one of the oldest Jesuit universities in the United States. The university is accredited by the Higher Learning Commission.

In the 2025–2026 academic year, SLU had an enrollment of 17,059 students, making SLU the fifth largest Catholic university in terms of enrollment in the United States. The student body included 8,502 undergraduate students and 6,702 graduate students that represent all 50 states and 96 countries. The university is classified among "R1: Doctoral Universities – Very High Spending and Doctorate Production".

For more than 50 years, the university has maintained the Saint Louis University Madrid Campus in Spain. SLU's athletic teams compete in the NCAA Division I as a member of the Atlantic 10 Conference.

== History ==
=== Early years ===
Saint Louis University traces its origins to the Saint Louis Academy, founded on November 16, 1818, by Louis William Valentine DuBourg, Bishop of Louisiana and the Floridas, and placed under the charge of François Niel and others of the secular clergy attached to the Saint Louis Cathedral. Its first location was in a private residence near the Mississippi River in an area now occupied by Gateway Arch National Park within the Archdiocese of St. Louis.

Already having a two-story building for the 65 students using Bishop Dubourg's personal library of 8,000 volumes for its printed materials, the name Saint Louis Academy was changed in 1820 to Saint Louis College (while the secondary school division remained Saint Louis Academy, now known as St. Louis University High School). In 1827 Bishop Dubourg placed Saint Louis College in the care of the Society of Jesus. Not long after that, it received its charter as a university by act of the Missouri Legislature.

According to William Faherty, the first Jesuit president of St. Louis College, Peter Verhaegen, was a key leader in building Catholicism in the West from his arrival 1823 to his death in 1853. He kept frontier needs in mind while designing the curriculum, intensified the school's Catholic life, established a medical department, and moved the school to a bigger campus. It included Protestants among its faculty, student body, and supporters. It introduced evening adult programs, and taught poor boys with city funding.

=== University beginnings and American Civil War ===
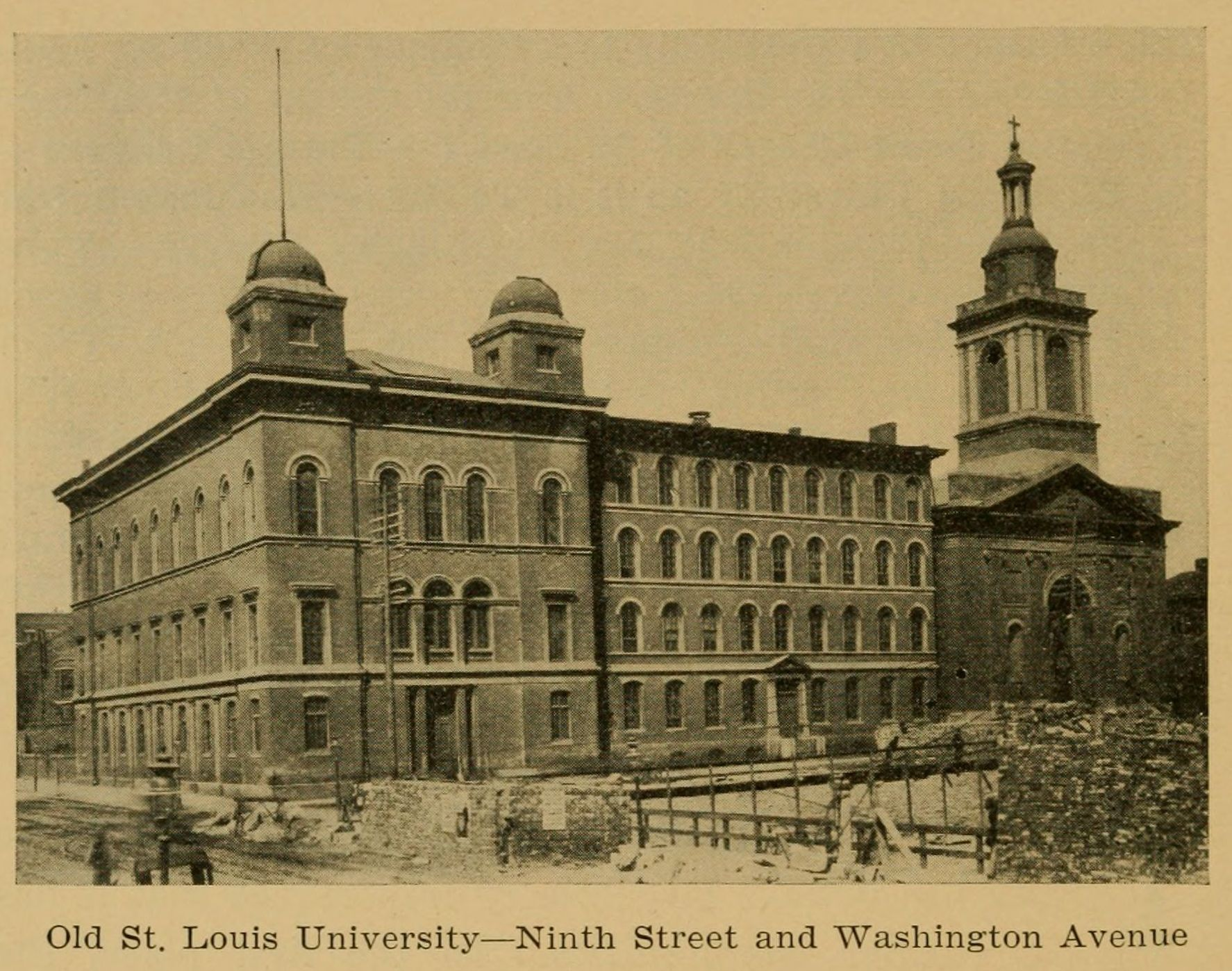
The university at its Washington and Ninth location

In 1829, the new university moved its campus to Washington Avenue and Ninth, today the site of America's Center. At this time, the founders forced enslaved Black Americans from their St. Stanislaus Seminary in Hazelwood to labor at the university. Many had previously been separated from their families enslaved at White Marsh Plantation.

In 1852 the university and its teaching priests were the subject of an anti-Catholic novel, The Mysteries of St. Louis, which was written by newspaper editor Henry Boernstein. Boernstein's popular newspaper, Anzeiger des Westens, routinely criticized the university.

In 1867, after the American Civil War, the university purchased "Lindell's Grove", in what is now Midtown. The university subsequently moved to this new location, which is the current site of today's north campus. Lindell's Grove was the site of the Camp Jackson Affair, which had occurred only a few years prior to the university's purchase.

The first building on campus, DuBourg Hall, began construction in 1888, and the college officially moved to its new location in 1889. Construction of the new St. Francis Xavier College Church began on 8 June 1884. The basement of the church was completed later that year and was the location for liturgical functions until the upper church was subsequently completed in 1898.

=== 20th century and shift to majority lay board of trustees ===
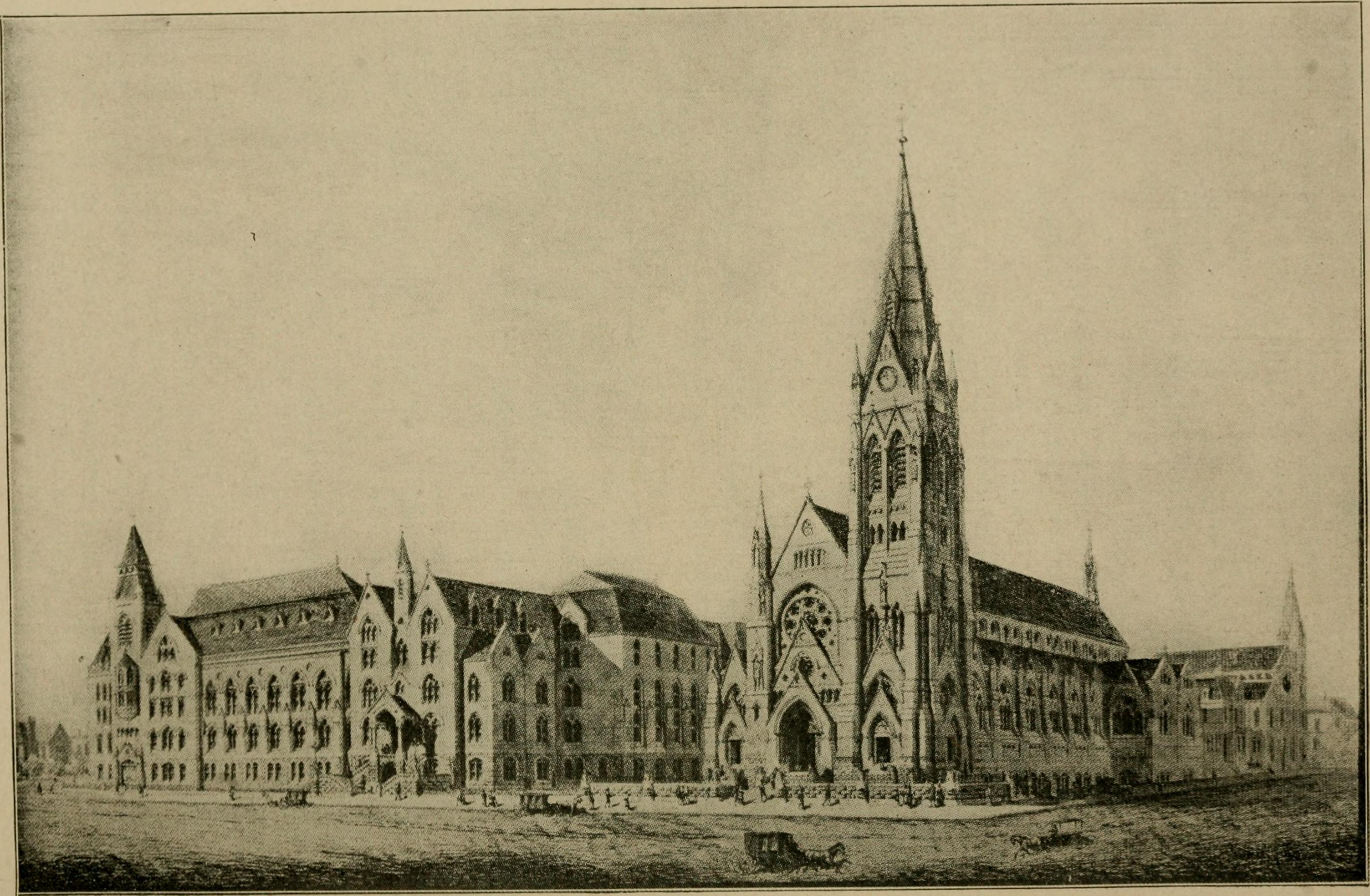
DuBourg Hall, the oldest building on SLU's campus, and St. Francis Xavier College Church in 1909

During the early 1940s, many local priests, especially the Jesuits, began to challenge the segregationist policies at the city's Catholic colleges and parochial schools. After the Pittsburgh Courier, an African-American newspaper, ran a 1944 exposé on St. Louis Archbishop John J. Glennon's interference with the admittance of a black student at the local Webster College, Claude Heithaus, professor of Classical Archaeology at Saint Louis University, delivered an angry homily accusing his own institution of immoral behavior in its segregation policies. By summer of 1944, Saint Louis University had opened its doors to African Americans, after its president, Patrick Holloran, secured Glennon's reluctant approval .

In 1967, Saint Louis University became one of the first Catholic universities to give laypeople more power over the affairs of the school. Board chairman Paul Reinert stepped aside to be replaced by layman Daniel Schlafly, and the board shifted to an 18 to 10 majority of laypeople. This was largely because of Horace Mann vs. the Board of Public Works of Maryland, a landmark case heard by the Maryland Court of Appeals, which declared unconstitutional grants to "largely sectarian" colleges. The Second Vatican Council has also been mentioned as a major influence on this decision for its increased focus on the laity, as well as the decreased recruitment of nuns and priests since the council.

From 1985 to 1992 the chairman of the Board of Trustees was William H. T. Bush (younger brother of former president George H. W. Bush). The younger Bush also taught classes at the school.

Since the move to lay oversight, there has been some debate over how much influence the Roman Catholic Church should have on the affairs of the university. The decision by the university to sell its hospital to Tenet Healthcare in 1997 met much resistance by both local and national Church leaders but went ahead as planned. In 2015, the Catholic SSM Health system assumed operation of Saint Louis University Hospital. Renovations were completed in 2020. In 2022, Saint Louis University sold its medical practice, SLUCare, to the SSM Health System as well.

As of 2023, 40 Jesuits taught, studied, and ministered at SLU.

=== Slavery, history, memory and reconciliation ===
In 2016, the institution revealed names and stories of Black Americans who had been enslaved by the university and its founders and who contributed to the cultivation and building of the institution. Direct descendants include Louis Chauvin and St. Louis Black Stockings player Sylvester Chauvin, whose burial site was marked by a headstone in 2022 through the Negro Leagues Baseball Grave Marker Project. Contemporary descendants formed the organization Descendants of the Saint Louis University Enslaved and are petitioning for a physical monument on campus to acknowledge the history of their ancestors. The group has estimated the contemporary value of labor performed by enslaved workers to be between 361 million to 74 billion dollars.

=== Timeline of notable events ===
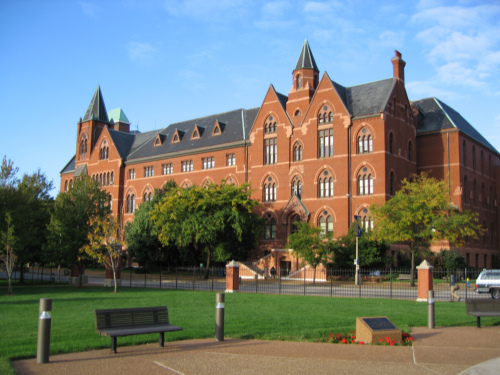
DuBourg Hall, as it appears today

- 1818 – First institution of higher learning west of the Mississippi River
- 1832 – First graduate programs west of the Mississippi River
- 1836 – First medical school west of the Mississippi River
- 1843 – First in the West to open a school of law
- 1906 – First forward pass in football history
- 1908 – First female students admitted
- 1910 – First business school west of the Mississippi River
- 1925 – First department of geophysics in the Western Hemisphere
- 1927 – First federally licensed school of aviation
- 1929 – First woman Ph.D. graduate, Mother Marie Kernaghan
- 1944 – First university in Missouri to establish an official policy admitting African-American students
- 1949 – First co-ed classes, in the College of Arts and Sciences
- 1955 – Marguerite Hall, first women's hall of residence, opens.
- 1967 – First major Catholic university to give lay and clergy people combined legal responsibility for institutional policy on its board of trustees.
- 1972 – First human heart transplant in the Midwest
- 2013 – First Doctor of Philosophy (Ph.D.) degree in aviation in the world awarded

== Campus ==
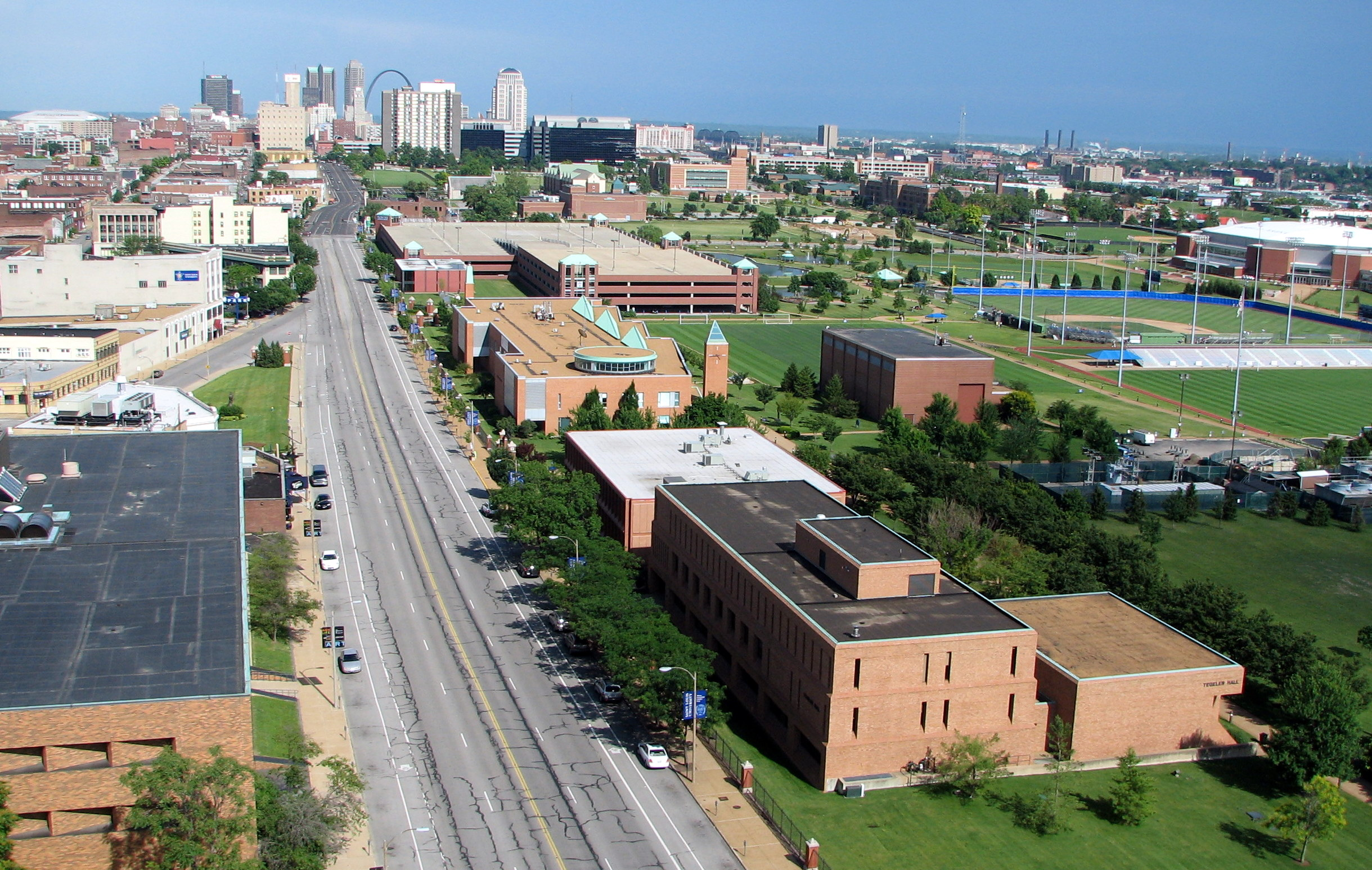
Northeastern quarter of campus

SLU's campus in Midtown, St. Louis consists of over 273 acres (110.5 ha) of land, with 129 buildings on campus. This area is split between two locations along Grand Boulevard. The north campus (or Frost Campus), located just north of I-64, is the site of most undergraduate learning and is also home to the university's residence halls. The south campus, located just south of Chouteau Avenue, is the site of the Saint Louis University Hospital, the Doisy Research Center, and some athletic facilities. Most health science instruction takes place on the south campus. The Saint Louis University School of Law is located in downtown St. Louis in Scott Hall.

Raymond L. Sullivant launched the campus in Madrid, Spain in 1967. Saint Louis University Madrid has nearly 1,000 students from more than 70 countries. The campus has a faculty of 125, an average class size of 17 and a student-faculty ratio of 12:1.

=== Major campus construction and renovation ===
==== Jesuit Center ====
In 2022, Saint Louis University opened a new residence for Jesuits living and working on campus. The 25-bedroom apostolic center also has a chapel where student Masses are held and community meeting rooms. The building replaces Jesuit Hall, which had been home to Saint Louis University Jesuits since 1973. Retired Jesuits moved to a Delmar Gardens facility in north St. Louis County.

==== Sinquefield Science and Engineering Center ====
In the fall of 2020, the university opened the Interdisciplinary Science and Engineering Building a new, 90,000-square-foot, three-story building featuring "innovative teaching environments and flexible lab spaces." The building is home to bioinformatics, biology, biomedical engineering, chemistry, neuroscience and computer science courses that support all science, engineering, nursing and health science majors at SLU. It was renamed the Sinquefield Science and Engineering Center in 2025.

==== Saint Louis University School of Law ====
Saint Louis University School of Law, founded in 1843, is the oldest law school west of the Mississippi River. Law students attend classes in Scott Hall, which is in downtown St. Louis. Scott Hall was bought and renovated by the university between 2012 and 2013, as the law school had outgrown its former site on SLU's midtown campus. The newly renovated building opened in 2013.

==== Edward A. Doisy Research Center ====
In 2007, SLU completed a 10-story research center on its Medical Campus Building, a green building named for Edward Adelbert Doisy, Nobel laureate of 1943 and a long-time faculty member at SLU. The building contains 80 labs that are used in the development of vaccines and in research initiatives studying cancer, liver disease, and other health conditions. The building is home to the Department of Biochemistry and Molecular Biology.

==== Chaifetz Arena ====
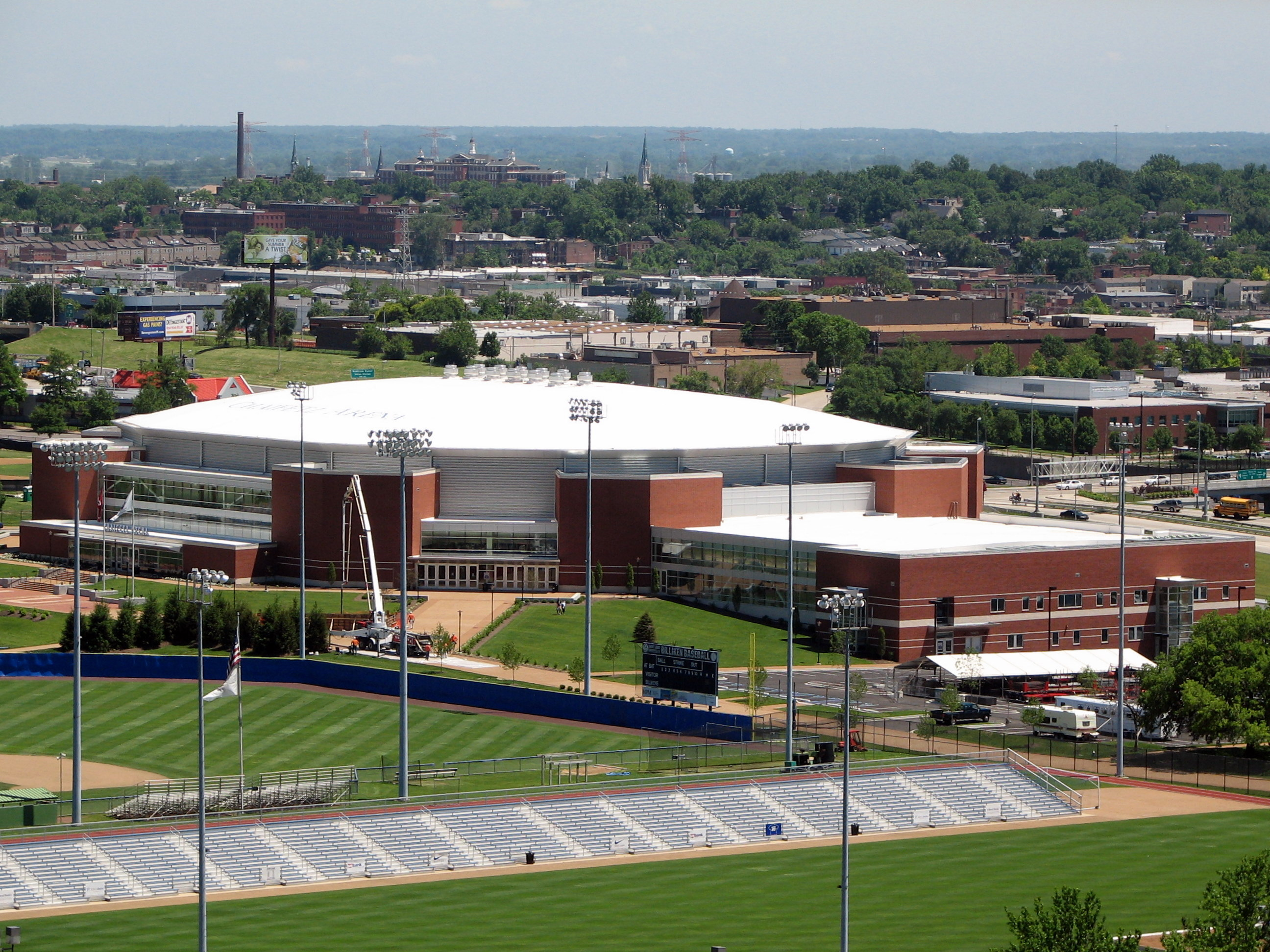
Chaifetz Arena, viewed from the air

The multi-purpose Chaifetz Arena, built in 2008, is a 10,600-seat stadium located on-campus. The arena also contains training facilities, locker rooms, and a practice facility that can house 1,000 spectators. It is on the eastern end of the north campus. The arena replaced Enterprise Center as the university's primary location for large events, notably commencement celebrations and varsity sports. The arena is named for alumnus Richard Chaifetz.

=== Housing ===
Saint Louis has residence halls and student apartment space on campus. As part of the university's First Year Experience (FYE) program, students are required to live on campus for their first four semesters at SLU, unless they are a commuter from the St. Louis metropolitan area.

=== St. Francis Xavier College Church ===
Located at the corner of Grand Boulevard and Lindell Boulevard is the university's official parish, St. Francis Xavier College Church. Built between 1888 and 1894 by architect Thomas Walsh, who also designed DuBourg Hall, the church was the first English-speaking parish in the city of St. Louis. The church has held a weekly Sunday Evening Mass for SLU students since 1990.

=== Clock tower ===
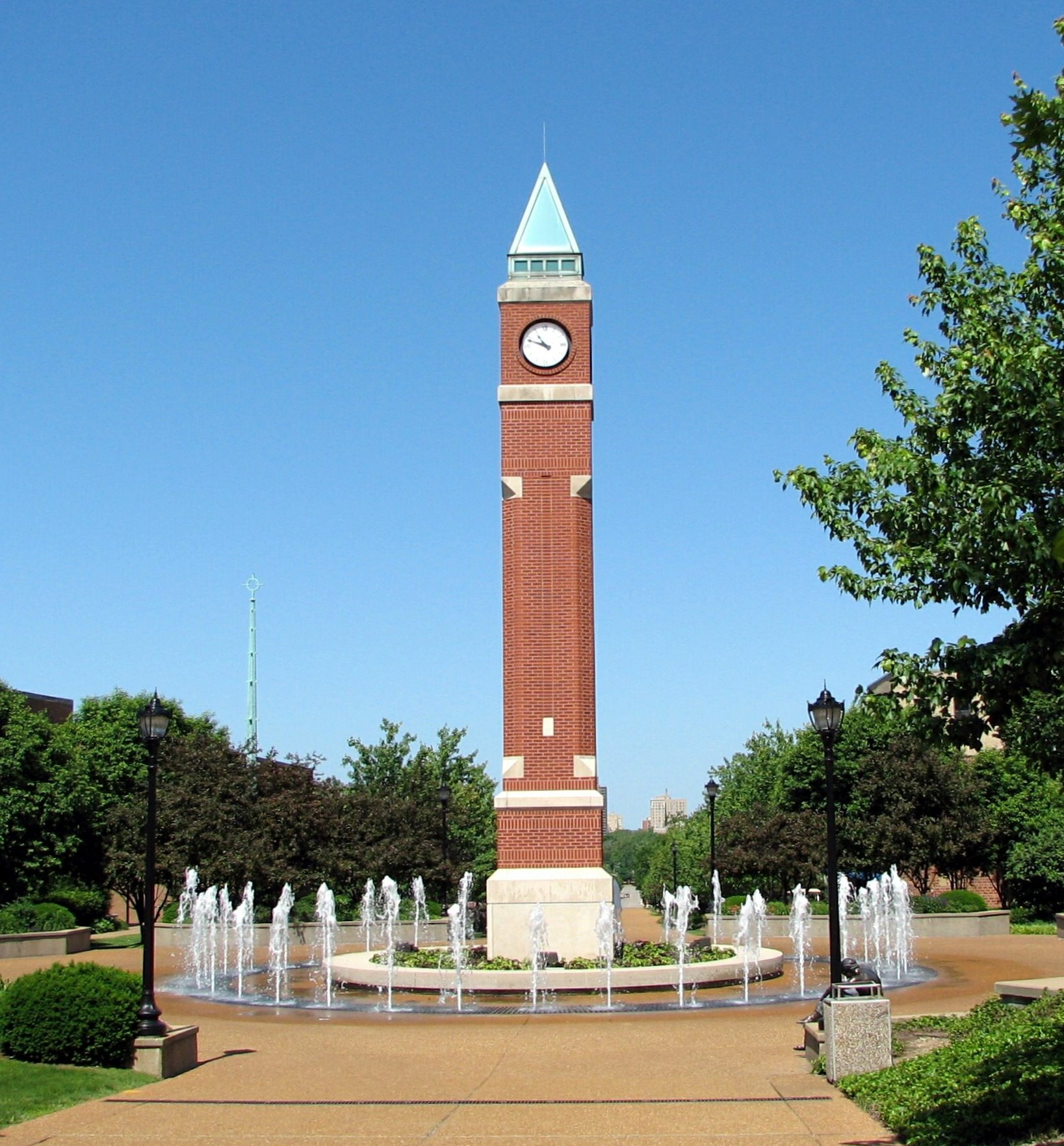
Joseph G. Lipic Clock Tower Plaza

Built in 1993, Saint Louis University's clock tower closed off the campus from West Pine Avenue from Spring Street to Vandeventer Avenue. The surrounding plaza is host to social gatherings, demonstrations, and philanthropic events.

In 2011, the clock tower and the area around it were renamed the Joseph G. Lipic Clock Tower Plaza. The amphitheater adjacent to the plaza was renamed in 2021 honor of Jonathan Smith.

In October 2014, the clocktower plaza became the focal point for a student-led demonstration known as OccupySLU. Hundreds of students descended on the plaza to engage in teach-ins, peaceful protest, and conversation in the aftermath of the shooting of Michael Brown and the shooting of Vonderrit Myers Jr. Students and community leaders peacefully occupied the plaza for six days. During this time, university president Fred Pestello negotiated with demonstrators to end the occupation.

=== Libraries and museums ===
Saint Louis University has three libraries in St. Louis, and one on its campus in Madrid, Spain: the Pius XII Memorial Library on the north campus, the Medical Center Library on south campus, the Vincent C. Immel Library at the law school in downtown St. Louis, and the library in San Ignacio Hall in Madrid.

Pius XII Memorial Library is the general academic library. It houses over 2.2 million books and e-books. Housed within Pius XII Memorial Library is the Knights of Columbus Vatican Film Library, which holds a unique collection of microfilm focusing on the manuscripts housed in the Biblioteca Apostolica Vaticana.

In 1964, SLU president Paul Reinert established the Saint Louis University Library Associates. The Associates are a group of "civic-minded St. Louisans...dedicated to the growth of the university libraries." Since 1967, the organization has presented the St. Louis Literary Award to a distinguished figure in literature. Notable recipients of the award include Salman Rushdie, E.L. Doctorow, Joan Didion, and R. Buckminster Fuller.

The university also has three museums: the Museum of Contemporary Religious Art (MOCRA), the Saint Louis University Museum of Art (SLUMA), and the Samuel Cupples House.

Pius XII Memorial Library

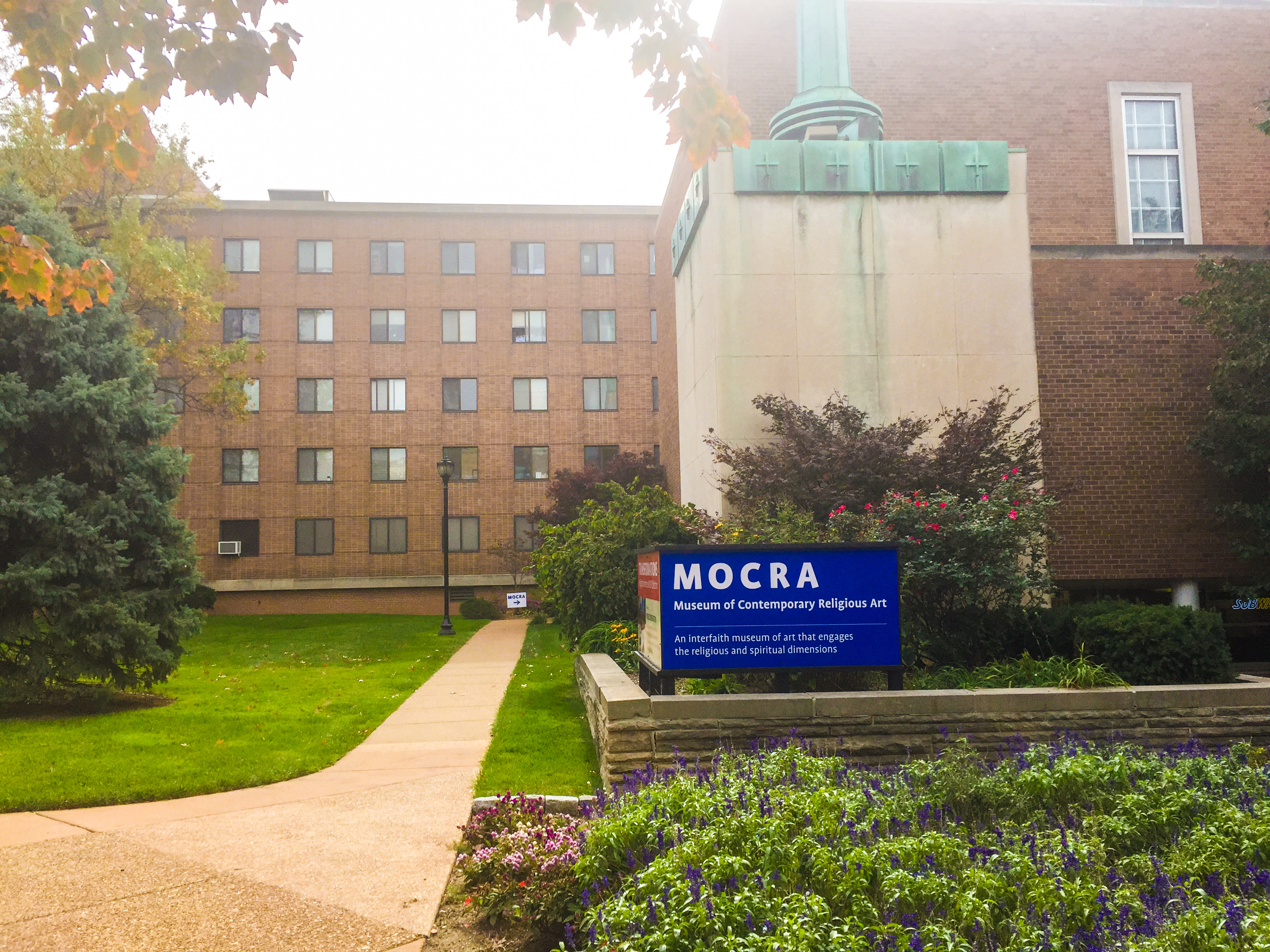
Museum of Contemporary Religious Art

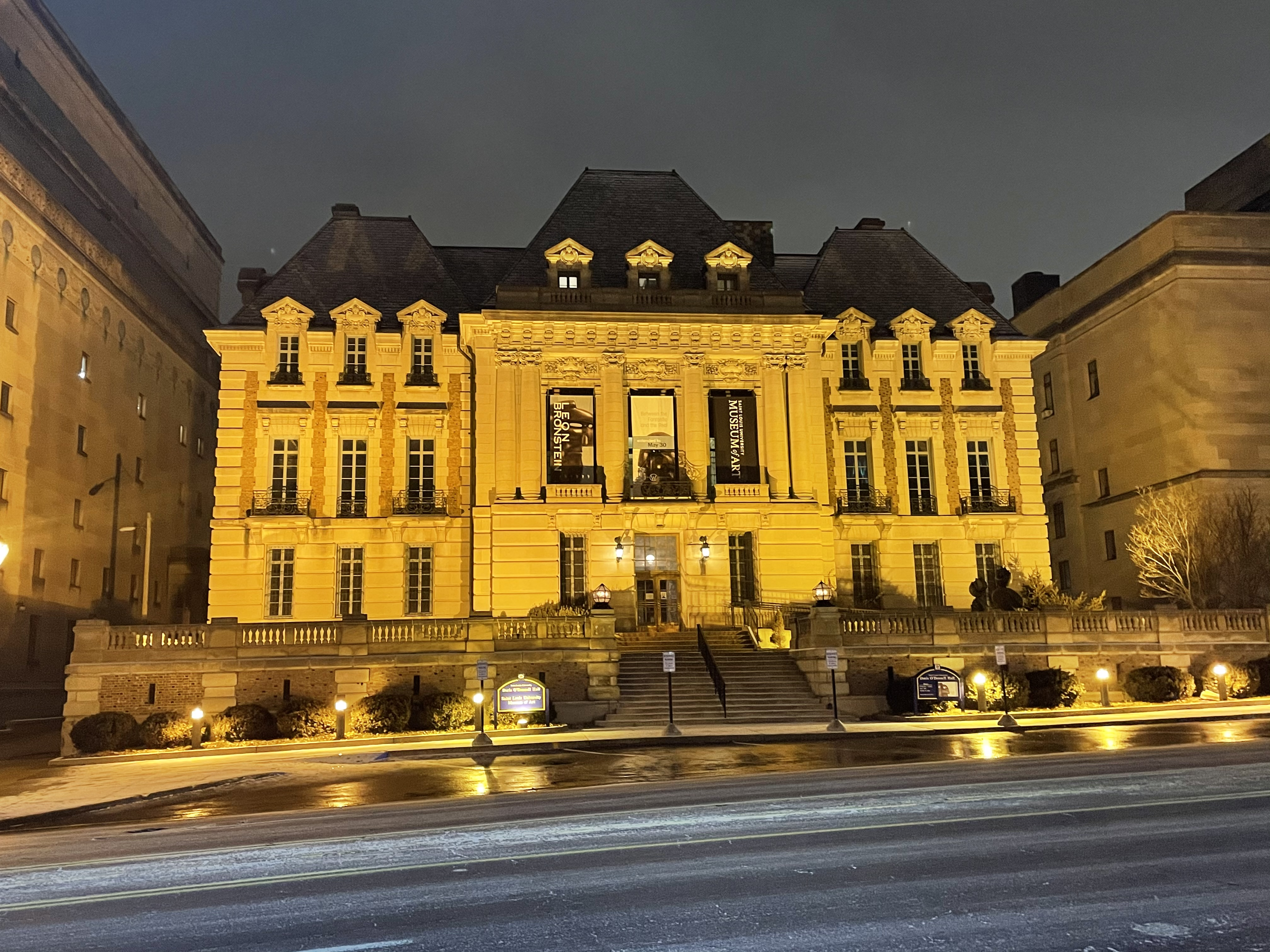
Saint Louis University Museum of Art

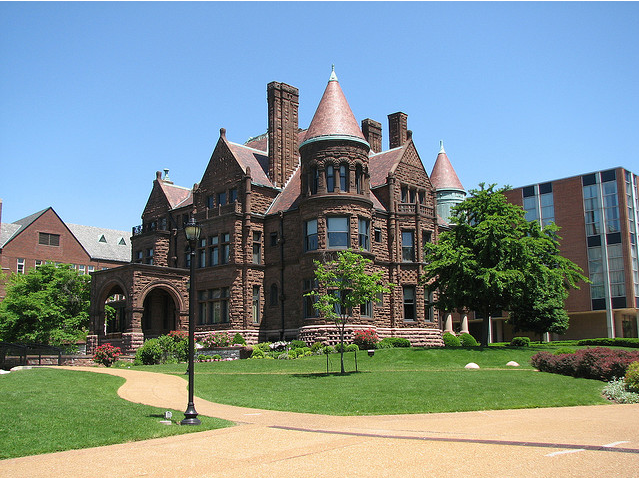
Samuel Cupples House

=== Administrative Offices ===
The Saint Louis University Office of Admissions Building was built in 1890 and had a number of different owners until it was acquired by the University in 1988.

=== Sculptures ===
The university has installed a number of sculptures and water features on the campus, including Living Flame, Flowing Water by Mel Meyer (1994), News from Marathon by Kirk St Maur (1994), The Classics by George Lundeen (1995), The Billiken by James Reid (1996), Daydreamer by Michael Atkinson (1995),Cor ad Cor Loquitur by James Michael Maher (1996), The Bather ("Sluzie in the Jacuzzi" according to some) by Gary Mauro (1997), Caduceus by James Muir (1997), The Pilgrim by Vicki Reid (2000)

== Academics and rankings ==
University rankings
- Saint Louis University

Global – Overall
- ARWU World: 501–600 (2026)
- THE World: 401–500 (2025)
- USNWR Global: 623 (2025–2026)

National – Overall
- ARWU National: 112–135 (2026)
- Forbes National: 203 (2025)
- THE National: 113 (2022)
- USNWR National: 102 (2026)
- Washington Monthly National: 235 (2022)

SLU offers 94 undergraduate majors and 88 graduate disciplines. The student-faculty ratio is 9:1.

The university operates 12 schools and colleges:

- College of Arts and Sciences
- College of Philosophy and Letters
- Doisy College of Health Sciences
- School of Medicine
- Trudy Busch Valentine School of Nursing
- College for Public Health and Social Justice
- School of Social Work
- Richard A. Chaifetz School of Business
- School of Education
- School of Law
- School of Science and Engineering
- School for Professional Studies
- Saint Louis University Madrid.

In addition, the university also operates a campus in Spain, Saint Louis University—Madrid, and the degree-granting Center for Advanced Dental Education.

=== Research ===
Saint Louis University's long research history includes the work of Edward Adelbert Doisy who discovered the lifesaving properties of Vitamin K and is the namesake of the university's research center, as well as its college of health sciences. One of only nine Catholic universities with a "higher" or highest" research activity designation from the Carnegie Classification of Institutions of Higher Education, SLU's current research spans science, technology, law, and the humanities and is funded by the federal government, private foundations, and partnerships. In 2018 became home to the Saint Louis University Research Institute, established through a $50 million gift from Rex Sinquefield and his wife, Jeanne. The SLU Research Institute performs research on geospatial, water, health data, translational neuroscience, and global Catholicism, among other topics.

== Athletics ==
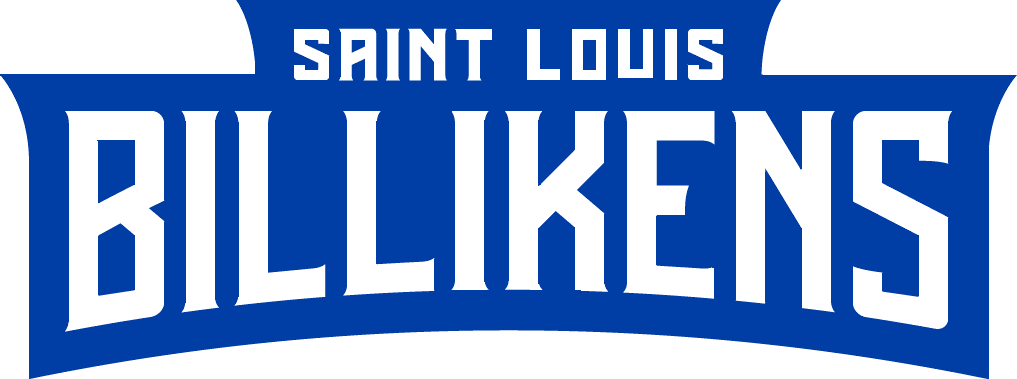
Saint Louis athletics wordmark

The Saint Louis Billikens are the collegiate athletic varsity teams of Saint Louis University. This NCAA Division I program fields teams in men's soccer, women's soccer, men's basketball, women's basketball, men's baseball, women's softball, women's volleyball, men's swimming and diving, women's swimming and diving, men's cross country, women's cross country, men's tennis, women's tennis, men's track and field, women's track and field, and women's field hockey.

The university competes in the Atlantic 10 Conference. In 2023, the women's basketball team made their first trip to the NCAA Tournament.

== Student life ==
=== Demographics ===
Saint Louis University has a residency requirement, 3,895 students lived on campus in fall 2023 including 89% of first- year students. More than 60% of students at SLU in 2021 identified as female and 33% identified as Black, Hispanic, Asian, or two or more races. According to the university's profile, 99% of first-time freshmen and 92% of all students receive aid with a $45,343 average aid award for freshmen in 2023–24. The university reports that 43% of students graduate without student loan debt.

=== Student organizations ===
Saint Louis University has over 215 student organizations. Students at SLU ranked third among U.S. universities in community engagement in 2023. The free speech watchdog group FIRE ranks SLU as a "warning" school due to its history of censoring both left and right wing speakers that disagree with the administration. The university's Policy on Speech, Expression and Civil Discourse is based on Ignatian principles.

==== Greek life ====
Saint Louis has more than 20 fraternities and sororities on campus.

== See also ==
- Education in St. Louis
- List of Jesuit sites
