= Samuel Cupples House =

Historic house in Missouri, United States

- U.S. National Register of Historic Places
- St. Louis Landmark
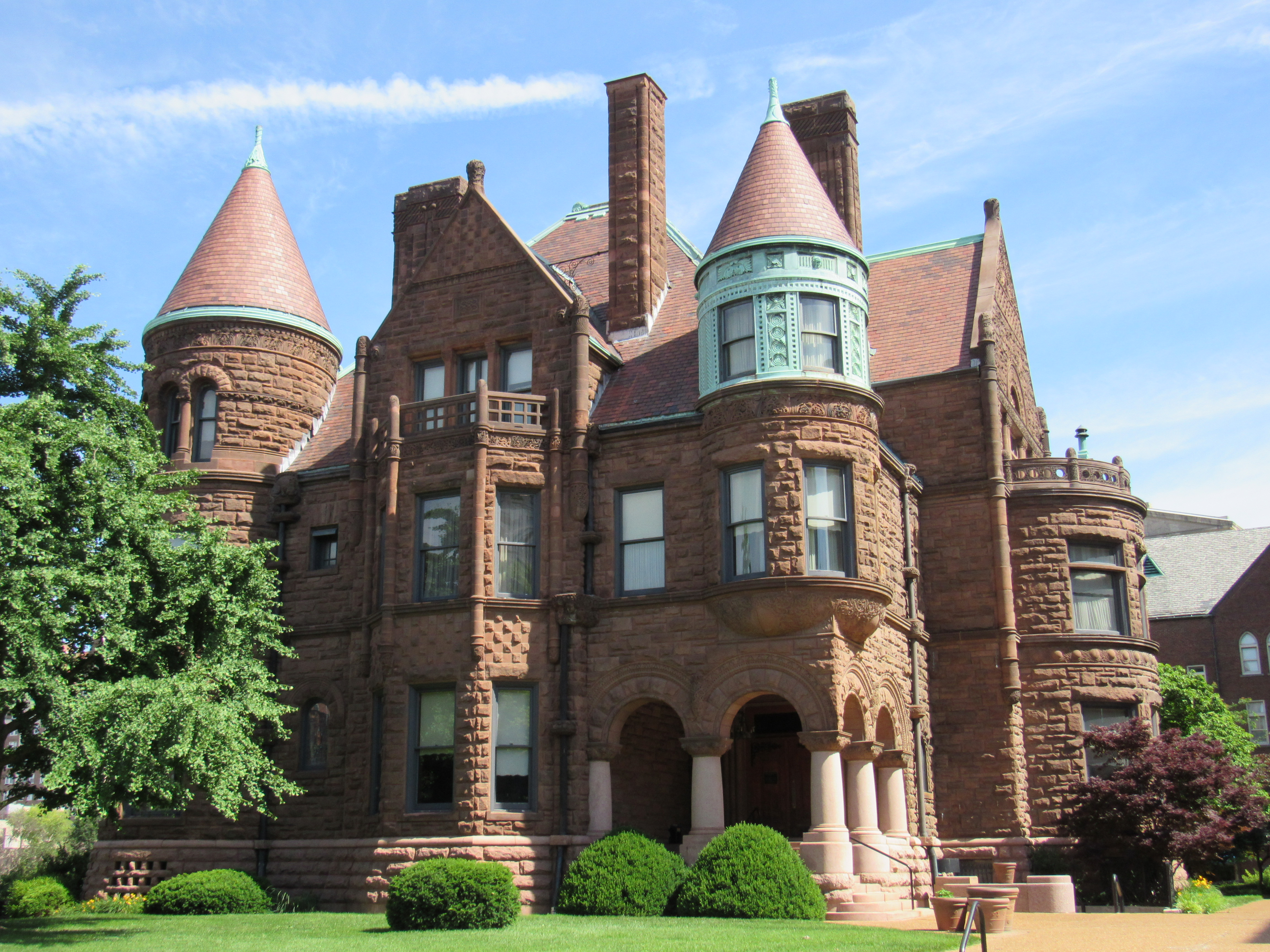
- Samuel Cupples House

- Location within St. Louis Location within Missouri Location within the United States
- Location: 3673 W. Pine Blvd, St. Louis, Missouri
- Coordinates: 38°38′12″N 90°14′09″W
- Built: 1888–1890
- Architect: Thomas B. Annan
- Architectural style: Romanesque Revival
- NRHP reference No.: 76002260
- Added to NRHP: October 21, 1976

The Samuel Cupples House is a historic mansion in St. Louis, Missouri, constructed from 1888 to 1890 by Samuel Cupples. It is now a museum on the campus of Saint Louis University. It was listed on the National Register of Historic Places in 1976.

== History ==
Originally designed by Thomas B. Annan in the Romanesque Revival architectural style, construction of the house and stables began in 1888, before being completed in 1890 at an expense of $15 million in 2020 dollars. Originally, the home was the residence of wealthy St. Louis entrepreneur Samuel Cupples. In 1946, the house was bought by Saint Louis University for $50,000 USD and converted to serve as a student center (complete with a bowling alley and bar in the basement) and an office for academic advising.

In 1973, Maurice McNamee, S.J. was tasked with restoring the mansion to its original appearance. Since its restoration, the house has been converted into a museum.

== Exhibits ==
Today, the Eleanor Turshin Glass Collection is shown throughout the house as a permanent exhibit showcasing Art Nouveau and Art Deco glassware. The basement of the building houses the McNamee Gallery, which hosts art exhibitions of SLU students and faculty, as well as visiting artists.

== See also ==
- National Register of Historic Places listings in St. Louis north and west of downtown
