= Saint Louis University Madrid Campus =

Roman Catholic university in Madrid, Spain

Saint Louis University-Madrid
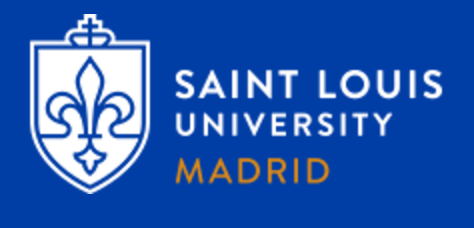
- Motto: Ad Majorem Dei Gloriam
- Motto in English: For the greater glory of God
- Type: Satellite campus
- Established: 1967; 59 years ago (Madrid)
- Parent institution: Saint Louis University
- Affiliations: Roman Catholic (Jesuit)
- Director: William "Bill" Johnson
- Academic staff: 110
- Students: 1,300
- Location: Madrid, Spain
- Colors: Blue & White
- Mascot: Billikens
- Website: www.slu.edu/madrid
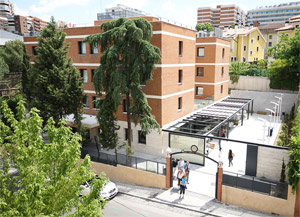

Saint Louis University—Madrid (SLU-Madrid) is a campus in Madrid, Spain, of Saint Louis University, a private Jesuit research university in St. Louis, Missouri. SLU-Madrid offers undergraduate and graduate degrees that can be completed in Spain or combined with studies at the St. Louis campus. It has over 1,300 students representing 75 nationalities.

== History ==
The Madrid campus was founded in 1967 by Raymond L. Sullivant as a study abroad program. Classes were offered in conjunction with the Universidad Pontificia Comillas, a Spanish Jesuit institution. The success of the study abroad program led Sullivant to develop an independent, permanent program, with administrative offices and classrooms located between Madrid's Complutense University and downtown Madrid.

Shortly thereafter, a number of Spanish students, attracted to the university's liberal arts curriculum, enrolled in classes. Within a decade, SLU-Madrid was home to hundreds of students. As the programs expanded, students were able to complete the first two years of their undergraduate studies in Madrid. By 2005, students were able to complete all four years of their degree and graduate in Madrid.

In 1990, SLU-Madrid acquired Padre Rubio and Padre Arrupe Halls. In 1996, the university became the first U.S. institution to receive official recognition from the Consejería de Educación y Deporte, Madrid's higher education authority. In 2011, the university expanded the Madrid campus further with the acquisition and renovation of San Ignacio Hall, providing additional space to support students and faculty, including a new library, cafeteria and auditorium.

Today, SLU-Madrid offers amenities like those found on university campuses in the United States. The campus offers four-year undergraduate degrees and graduate degrees, and hosts study abroad students from more than 150 universities in the U.S. and worldwide.

== Campus ==
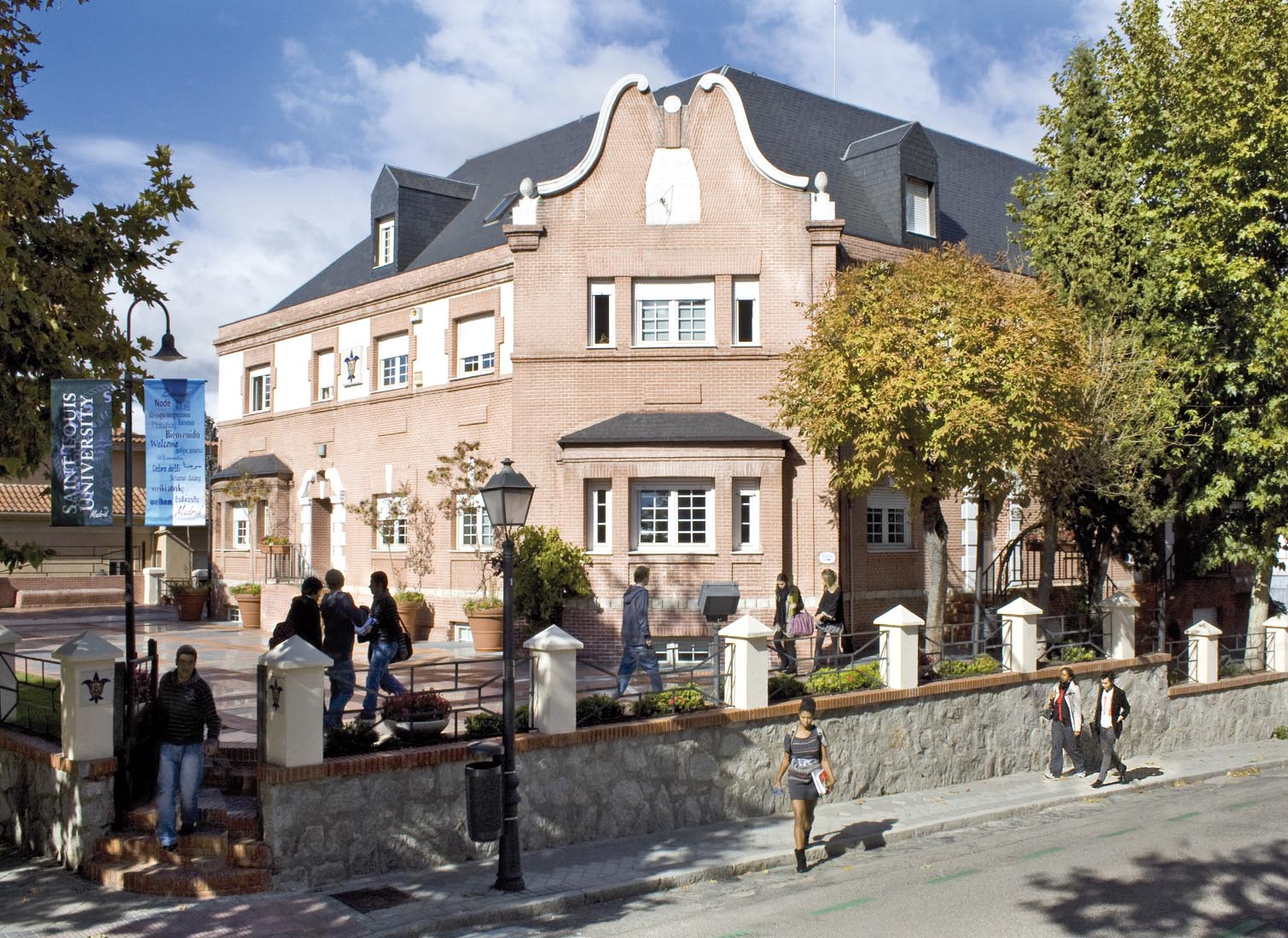
Facade of SLU-Madrid Campus, Padre Arrupe Hall

Padre Arrupe Hall houses administrative and faculty offices, classrooms, and biology, chemistry, computer, nursing and physics labs. Padre Rubio Hall, the main academic building, features additional classrooms, the Office of Student Life, student lounges, the bookstore and St. Timothy's Chapel. San Ignacio Hall, acquired in 2011, is home to an auditorium, art, dance and music studios, additional classrooms, a full-service cafeteria and dining room, the library, faculty offices and a rooftop terrace.

In addition to over 10,000 volumes that are available in the Madrid library, students in Madrid have access to the vast collection of electronic resources and databases owned by Saint Louis University.

== Academics ==
SLU-Madrid fulfill offers nearly 100 undergraduate majors available through Saint Louis University with select programs also completely available on the Madrid Campus. Students pursuing other majors including engineering and nursing can complete the first two years of study in Madrid before transferring to the St. Louis Campus to finish their degree. SLU-Madrid also hosts visiting students from over 150 universities across the United States and around the world. Study abroad students choose from more than 200 courses each semester, including classes in engineering, health sciences and other non-traditional study abroad fields.

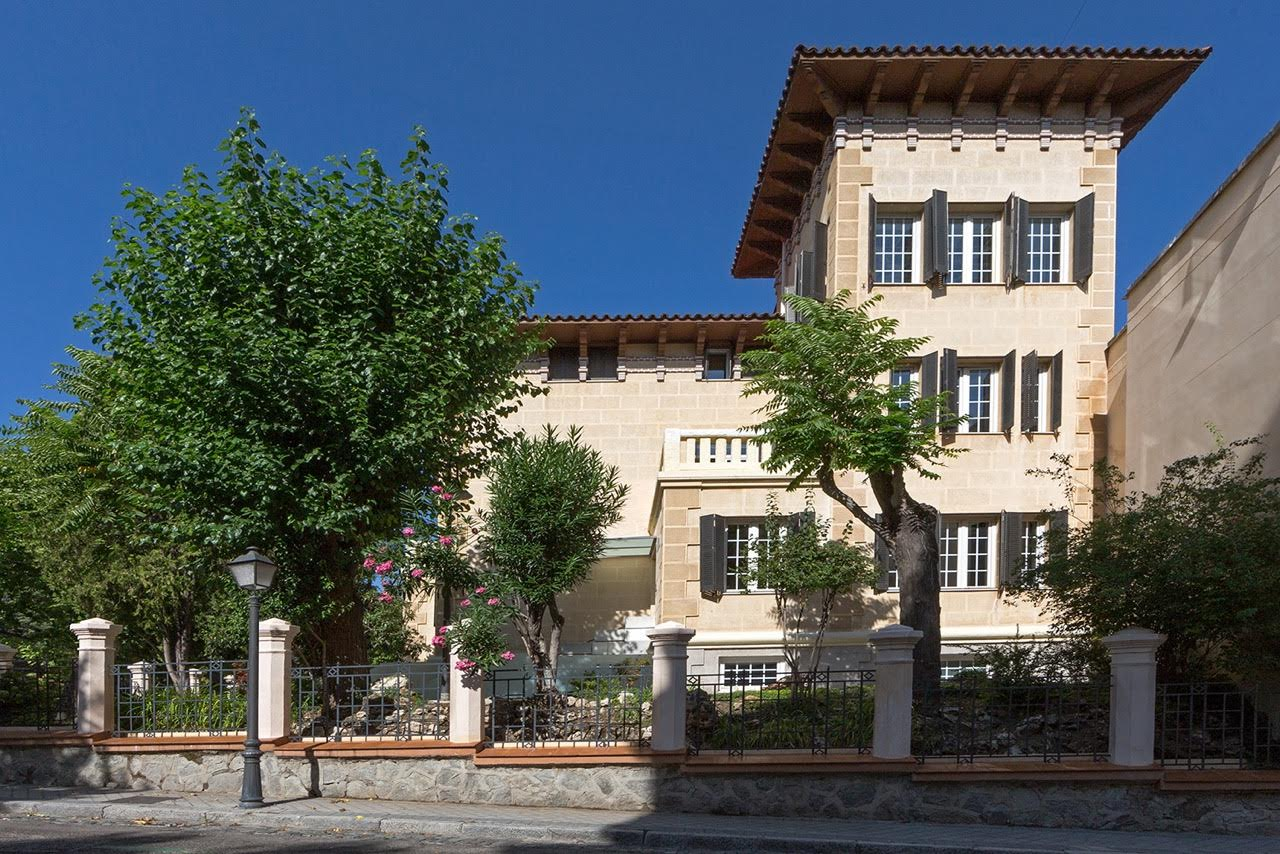
Padre Rubio Hall

SLU-Madrid offers two M.A. programs; students may fulfill all requirements for the M.A. programs in Madrid or through a combination of study at the Madrid Campus and the St. Louis Campus.

=== Accreditation ===
Saint Louis University is accredited by the Higher Learning Commission (HLC) and has been continuously accredited since 1916. Specific programs and units at the university are also accredited by appropriate professional bodies for specific programs; for example, the Richard A. Chaifetz School of Business, through which the Madrid Campus offers its International Business program, is accredited by AACSB International (Association to Advance Collegiate Schools of Business). Engineering degrees are accredited by the Engineering Accreditation Commission of the Accreditation Board for Engineering and Technology (ABET).

== Student life ==
The Office of Student Life sponsors a wide range of extracurricular activities, both on and off campus, including trips that deepen students’ cultural understanding of Spain or that complement their studies by taking them to destinations around Spain, Europe, and Africa. Clubs include the Student Government Association, the Gay-Straight Alliance, the International Relations Society, Poker Club, the Glee Club, Film Club, Debate Club, among others.

Campus Ministry organizes a program of activities for exploring faith and a commitment to social justice. Each semester, the university sponsors a retreat to Loyola, the birthplace of St. Ignatius, the founder of the Jesuit order. The Ignatian Community Council organizes panel discussions, service projects, documentary film viewings, and interfaith activities to encourage dialogue within the diverse religious community on campus and address the tough issues of social justice the world faces today.

In keeping with the Jesuit mission of the university, SLU-Madrid offers its students, faculty and staff opportunities for living out their identity as "men and women for others" through community service and outreach. Volunteers collaborate with dozens of local NGOs. Projects include teaching English to hearing-impaired children, serving meals in a soup kitchen, and raising money for the Red Cross.

SLU-Madrid offers career counseling, practice interviews, résumé critiques and workshops/ networking events on campus.

=== Mascot ===
The Billiken is Saint Louis University's distinctive mascot and has been for 100 years.

== See also ==
- List of Jesuit sites
