= The Bette Midler Show =

1976 film

- Embassy Cover from RCA SelectaVision CED disc
- Written by: Jerry Blatt; Bette Midler; Bruce Vilanch
- Directed by: Tom Trbovich
- Starring: Bette Midler
- Country of origin: United States
- Original language: English

Production
- Producer: Aaron Russo
- Running time: 134 minutes

Original release
- Network: HBO
- Release: June 19, 1976

The Bette Midler Show is an HBO television special of one of Bette Midler's tours entitled "The Depression Tour," shot at the Cleveland Music Hall during February 1976 and also issued on Midler's album Live at Last.

The show features many of Bette's popular songs, such as "Boogie Woogie Bugle Boy", "Friends", "In The Mood", "Hello In There", and "Lullaby of Broadway" As well as dazzling the audience with her spontaneous wit with her 'Wonderful Sophie Tucker Jokes' and her special 'The Vicki Eydie Show'.

The original HBO broadcast ran 134 minutes, including material from both of her Cleveland performances and a 5-minute intermission. When it was released on VHS, Betamax and CED Videodisc in 1984 by Embassy Home Video, it was severely shortened to 84-minutes. Performances of "Birds," "Shiver Me Timbers," the entire "Story of Nanette," a Harlettes-only musical number and countless jokes were removed.

The special has never officially been issued on DVD, but bootlegs are rampant and clips from both versions have surfaced on YouTube.

== Cast and personnel ==
=== Cast ===
- Bette Midler – Herself

=== Harlettes ===
- Sharon Redd – Harlettes – Vocals
- Ula Hedwig – Harlettes – Vocals
- Charlotte Crossley – Harlettes – Vocals

=== Musicians ===
- Betsy And The Blowboys – The Orchestra
- Don York – Keyboards
- Lou Volpe – Guitar
- Richard Trifan – Keyboards
- Ira "Buddy" Williams – Drums
- Jaroslav Jakubovic – Reeds
- Miles Krasner – Trumpet
- Francisco Centeno – Bass
- Joseph Mero – Percussion and Vibes
- Elizabeth Kane – Harp

=== Personnel ===
- Toni Basil – Choreographer
- Aaron Russo – Producer
- Don York – Musical Director
- Bruce Vilanch
  Jerry Blatt – Special Material

== Acts ==
=== Act I ===
1. Friends/Oh My My
2. I Sold My Heart To The Junkman
3. Birds (HBO Version)
4. Comic Relief
5. In the Mood
6. Hurry on Down
7. Shiver me Timbers (HBO Version)
8. The Vicki Eydie Show: Around the World, Istanbul, Fiesta in Rio, South Sea's scene, I'm Wishing/One Song, A Dream is a Wish Your Heart Makes,
9. Lullaby of Broadway
10. Intermission: You're Moving Out Today

=== Act II ===
1. Roll Me Through The Rushes (The Harlettes) (HBO Version)
2. Delta Dawn
3. Long John Blues
4. Those Wonderful Sophie Tucker Jokes
5. The Story of Nanette: Nanette, Alabama Song, Drinking Again, Mr. Rockefeller, Ready to Begin Again, Do You Wanna Dance (HBO Version)
6. Fried Eggs
7. Hello in there
8. Finale: Up the Ladder to the Roof, Boogie Woogie Bugle Boy, Friends

For further info see Live at Last (Bette Midler album)
