= Roll Me Through the Rushes =

1976 single by Rosie

- 7-inch single

Single by Rosie
- Genre: Soft rock; Ballad
- Length: 5:18 (album version); 3:35 (single)
- Label: RCA
- Songwriter(s): David Lasley; Lana Marrano
- Producer(s): Genya Ravan; Harvey Goldberg

"Roll Me Through the Rushes"

Song by Chaka Khan

from the album Chaka
- Released: 1978
- Genre: R&B; soul
- Length: 4:42
- Label: Warner Bros.
- Songwriter(s): David Lasley; Lana Marrano
- Producer(s): Arif Mardin

Music video
- "Roll Me Through The Rushes" on YouTube

"Roll Me Through the Rushes" is a song written by David Lasley and Lana Marrano (née Susan Joan Gaynes), originally recorded by Rosie, featuring the vocals of David Lasley and released on their "Better Late Than Never" album by RCA in 1976. American R&B singer and songwriter Chaka Khan covered the song for her debut solo album, Chaka, produced by Arif Mardin and released in 1978 by Warner Bros. Records.

The Harlettes opened Act II of Bette Midler's 1976 The Bette Midler Show HBO special with "Roll Me Through the Rushes". In 1977, the live concert was released as Live at Last), Midler's first live album. The song was recorded by Sharon Redd, Ula Hedwig and Charlotte Crossley on their "Formerly of the Harlettes" album released in 1978.

== Chaka Khan version ==
=== Overview ===
Of Chaka Khan's recording on her debut solo album,

The sentimental ballad "Roll Me Through the Rushes" is poetically engaging, and despite never being released as a single, it became a mainstay of radio.

— Craig Lytle, Allmusic

=== Credits and personnel ===
Credits are adapted from the album's liner notes.

- Cissy Houston – backing vocals
- Hamish Stuart – backing vocals
- David Lasley – backing vocals, songwriting
- Luther Vandross – backing vocals
- Will Lee – bass
- Rick Marotta – drums
- Leon Pendarvis – electric piano
- Brook Tillotson – French horn
- Jim Buffington – French horn
- Cornell Dupree – guitar
- Phil Upchurch – guitar
- Gene Bianco – harp
- Lana Marrano – songwriting
- Arif Mardin – producer, arranging

Recorded at Atlantic Studios.

== Critical reception ==
The song received notable critical praise and mention in numerous record reviews and reviews, with Don Shewey of the Boston Phoenix declaring it a "pop-gospel standard". HiFi Magazine wrote "The Arif Mardin-produced album celebrates a lot of Aretha soul" citing "Roll Me Through the Rushes".
