= Missin' Twenty Grand =

Studio album by David Lasley
- Released: 1982
- Studio: A&M Studios (Hollywood); Hollywood Sound Recorders (Hollywood); Bill Schnee (Los Angeles)
- Label: EMI Records
- Producer: David Lasley; Willie Wilcox; Joe Wissert; Bill Schnee (assoc.); Dave Iveland (assoc.)

David Lasley chronology
Missin' Twenty Grand (1982)	Raindance (1984)

Singles from Missin' Twenty Grand
- 1. "If I Had My Wish Tonight" Released: 1982; 2. "Treat Willie Good" Released: 1982

Missin' Twenty Grand is the debut studio album by the American singer and songwriter David Lasley, released in 1982 on EMI Records. It was met with critical acclaim by music journalists including Stephen Holden, Dave Marsh and Don Shewey, among others. Adam Block of The Advocate wrote “In 1982 a little-known album Missin’ Twenty Grand (EMI), cropped up on the year's Top Ten lists of critics for Rolling Stone, The New York Times and The Village Voice.”

The album was produced by Lasley, who wrote or co-wrote six of the ten songs. Thematically, the album centers around longing for his days singing at The 20 Grand, a Detroit club where he made appearances with his group The Utopias.

Pete Townshend, James Taylor, Bonnie Raitt and Luther Vandross make guest appearances along with studio players. Willie Wilcox, Bill Schnee, Dave Iveland and Joe Wissert are also credited as producers.

"If I Had My Wish Tonight" was issued as the lead single. “Treat Willie Good” was issued as a single in the UK.

== Critical reception ==
Professional ratings
Review scores
Source	Rating
AllMusic	4/5 stars
Christgau's Record Guide	B+

Holden called it one "of the year's most impressive debut albums"..."superbly crafted, organically conceived" and "accessible mainstream pop."

"The blue-eyed soul crooner from the Motor City...pours out his feelings with a tenderness and warmth that recalls the early Chi-Lites and Raindrops"..."falsetto intonations spiced with playfulness, amity and sheer joy."

"Personal and sensitive songs" Lasley's unique falsetto vocal style works well on both pop and r&b accented tunes"...

“A white boy's homage to Motown, a between-the-lines gay romance, the last of a dying breed of singer-songwriters.”

== Track listing ==
No.	Title	Writer(s)	Producer(s)	Length
1.	"Got to Find Love"	David Lasley; Willie Wilcox	Lasley; Wilcox; Bill Schnee (assoc.)	3:43
2.	"If I Had My Wish Tonight"	David Loggins; Randy Goodrum	Lasley; Dave Iveland (assoc.)	3:29
3.	"Looking for Love on Broadway"	James Taylor	Lasley	2:38
4.	"On Third Street"	Lasley	Lasley	4:16
5.	"Take a Look"	Clyde Otis	Lasley	3:58
6.	"Treat Willie Good"	Lasley	Joe Wissert; Lasley; Schnee (assoc.)	3:40
7.	"Never Say"	Lasley; Wilcox	Lasley; Schnee (assoc.)	4:12
8.	"Roommate"	Lasley	Lasley	4:27
9.	"Where Is Charlie and Joanne"	Lasley	Lasley	4:41
10.	"Take the Money and Run"	Don Paul Yowell	Lasley; Schnee (assoc.)	4:02
11.	"On Third Street – Reprise"	Lasley	Lasley	0:34

== Personnel ==
Musicians

- David Lasley – lead vocals, background vocals (1–4, 6–10), handclaps (6)
- David Benoit – piano (3–6, 8–10), Fender Rhodes (1, 2, 5–8, 10), Prophet (1), organ (2), conducting (2)
- Chuck Cochran – guitar (2, 4, 7, 9, 10), background vocals (2)
- Susan M. Collins – background vocals (8)
- Charlotte Crossley – background vocals (6, 7, 10), handclaps (6)
- Bryan Cumming – tenor saxophones (4)
- Nick De Caro – string arrangements (7, 9), strings conducting (7, 9, 10)
- Victor Feldman – acoustic piano and percussion (7)
- Chuck Findley – trumpet (6, 10)
- David Garibaldi – tambourine (2)
- Joann Harris – background vocals (6, 7, 10)
- Jerry Hey – horn arrangements and trumpet (6, 10), string arrangements (10)
- Osamu Kitajima – guitar (3), acoustic guitar (9)
- Gayle Levant – harp (9)
- Jody Linscott – congas (2, 4, 6); bells (8), cricket (8), temple blocks (8), spirit stick (9), leaves (9)
- Arif Mardin – string arrangements (2)
- Arnold McCuller – background vocals (1, 3, 4, 8, 10), handclaps (6)
- Joel Peskin – saxophone (6, 10), saxophone solo (1), alto saxophone (8)
- Bonnie Raitt – background vocals (2)
- Bill Reichenbach – trombone (6, 10)
- Wade Short – bass guitar (1, 2)
- James Taylor – background vocals (1)
- Pete Townshend – guitar (8)
- Luther Vandross – background vocals (6)
- Marty Walsh – guitar (1, 2, 4, 6, 8, 10)
- Bobby Watson – bass guitar (3, 4, 6–8, 10)
- Ernie Watts – saxophone (6, 10), tenor saxophone solo (7)
- Willie Wilcox – drums (1–10), celeste (6), handclaps (6)
- David Williams – upright bass (5, 9)

Technical personnel

- Gerry Brown – assistant engineer (8, 9, 11), mixing (11)
- Marsha K. Burns – production coordinator
- Frank De Caro – string contractor
- Derek Du Nann – rhythm track, vocal, string and horn engineer (2–5)
- Benny Faccone – assistant engineer (1–5, 8, 9, 11)
- Dave Iveland – engineer (1–5, 8, 9, 11), mixing (4, 11)
- Paul McKenna – assistant rhythm track, vocal, string and horn engineer (2–5)
- Ross Pallone – assistant engineer (6)
- Tom Perry – engineer (6)
- Mike Reese – mastering
- Doug Sax – mastering
- David Schober – assistant engineer (7, 10)
- Bill Schnee – engineer (7, 10), additional engineering (1, 2), horn and handclap engineer (6), strings engineer (9), mixing (1–3, 5–10)
