= ...Too =

Studio album by Carole Bayer Sager
- Released: August 15, 1978
- Recorded: February 21, 1978
- Studios: The Record Plant, Los Angeles
- Genre: Pop
- Length: 34:30
- Label: Elektra Records
- Producer: Brooks Arthur

Carole Bayer Sager chronology
Carole Bayer Sager (1977)	...Too (1978)	Sometimes Late at Night (1981)

Singles from ...Too
- 1. "It's the Falling in Love"; 2. "I Don't Wanna Dance No More"

Professional ratings
Review scores
Source	Rating
AllMusic	4/5 stars

...Too is the second studio album by American songwriter Carole Bayer Sager, released in 1978 by Elektra Records. The album reached number 68 on the Australian chart.

== Track listing ==
All tracks are written by Carole Bayer Sager, with additional contributors noted.

Side one (One...)
No.	Title	Writer(s)	Length
1.	"To Make You Smile Again"	Melissa Manchester	3:03
2.	"It's the Falling in Love"	David Foster	3:55
3.	"Peace in My Heart"	Manchester	3:26
4.	"Shadows"	Alice Cooper; Bruce Roberts	2:12
5.	"You're Interesting"	Peter Allen	3:58

Side two (Too...)
No.	Title	Writer(s)	Length
6.	"There's Something About You"	Marvin Hamlisch	2:46
7.	"It Doesn't Add Up"	Johnny Vastano	4:08
8.	"I Don't Wanna Dance No More"	Foster	3:51
9.	"One Star Shining"	Roberts	3:35
10.	"I'm Coming Home Again"	Roberts	4:42

== Personnel ==
=== Musicians ===
- Carole Bayer Sager – lead vocals, organ (7)
- Ira Newborn – acoustic guitar (5), guitar (6, 7, 10)
- Thom Rotella – acoustic guitar (3)
- Don Costa – arrangements (1)
- David Foster – arrangements, keyboards (2, 8), synthesizer (5)
- Paul Buckmaster – arrangements (3, 7)
- David Campbell – arrangements (5–7, 9)
- Marvin Hamlisch – arrangements (5, 7), piano (1, 6)
- Jerry Hey – arrangements, trumpet (8)
- Bill Champlin – background vocals (2, 8)
- Michael McDonald – background vocals (2)
- Melissa Manchester – background vocals, piano (3)
- Alice Cooper – background vocals (4)
- Bruce Roberts – background vocals, piano (4, 9)
- Brenda Russell – background vocals (7)
- Carmen Twillie – background vocals (8)
- Weddy Gloud – background vocals (8)
- David Lasley – background vocals (9)
- Luther Vandross – background vocals (9)
- David Hungate – bass guitar (2, 8)
- Reinie Press – bass guitar (3)
- Lee Sklar – bass guitar (5–7, 9)
- Richard Davis – bass guitar (10)
- Ed Greene – drums (2, 6)
- Jim Gordon – drums (3)
- Russ Kunkel – drums (5, 7)
- Jeff Porcaro – drums (8)
- Jim Keltner – drums (9, 10)
- Jim Hughart – electric bass (10)
- Lee Ritenour – electric guitar (3), guitar (7)
- Steve Lukather – electric guitar (5), guitar (2, 6, 8)
- Craig Doerge – electric piano (5, 7)
- Michael Rubini – electric piano (10)
- Johnny Vastano – guitar (7)
- Jay Graydon – guitar (8)
- Richie Zito – guitar (9)
- Art Smith – ocarina (7)
- Dick Hazard – orchestrations (10)
- Alan Estes – percussion (7, 10)
- Steve Forman – percussion (2)
- Skip Redwine – piano (10)
- Kim Hutchcroft – reeds (8)
- Larry Williams – reeds (8)
- Nino Tempo – saxophone (1)
- Steve Porcaro – synthesizer (3, 5, 8)
- Bill Reichenbach – trombone (8)
- George Bohanon – trombone (8)
- Gary Grant – trumpet (8)
- Jennifer Sloan – vocals (7)

=== Production ===
- Jill Harris – production coordination
- Bob Merritt – sound engineer
- Brooks Arthur – sound engineer, producer
- Ira Leslie – sound engineer
- Gabe Veltri – sound engineer
- Rich Feldman – sound engineer
- David Latman – sound engineer
- Bernie Grundman – mastering

=== Design ===
- Ron Coro – design
- Ethan Russell – photography

== Charts ==
Chart (1978)	Peak position
Australia (Kent Music Report)	68
