= Live at Last (Bette Midler album) =

Live album by Bette Midler
- Released: June 1977
- Recorded: 1976, 1977
- Venues: Cleveland Music Hall, Cleveland, Ohio
- Genre: Vocal
- Length: 87:18
- Label: Atlantic 2SD 9000
- Producer: Lew Hahn

Bette Midler chronology
Songs for the New Depression (1976)	Live at Last (1977)	Broken Blossom (1977)

Singles from Live at Last
- 1. "You're Movin' Out Today"

Professional ratings
Review scores
Source	Rating
Allmusic	3/5 stars
Christgau's Record Guide	A−
The Rolling Stone Album Guide	3/5 stars

Live at Last is the first live album by American singer Bette Midler, a two-disc set released in 1977, Midler's fourth album release on the Atlantic Records label. The album spawned from her live, recorded performance, "The Depression Tour" in Cleveland, entitled "The Bette Midler Show". The album was released on CD for the first time in 1993. A limited edition remastered version of the album was released by Friday Music in 2012.

== Background and content ==
Live at Last documents a full-length live performance at the Cleveland Music Hall, Cleveland, Ohio on the 1976 Depression Tour, and sees Midler, her backing group The Staggering Harlettes and her band Betsy and the Blowboys covering material from her three first albums as well as The Supremes' "Up the Ladder to the Roof", Neil Young's "Birds", Ringo Starr's "Oh My My", the mock lounge act The Vicky Eydie Show doing a "global revue" and the song cycle The Story of Nanette. The album also captures Midler's rapport with - or loving heckling of - the Cleveland audience, a monologue about fried eggs and a part that since has become a staple of her live performances: the raunchy Sophie Tucker jokes.

Live at Last also features a studio recording, the single "You're Moving Out Today", co-written by Midler and Carole Bayer Sager and produced by Tom Dowd. This was the only single release from the album (#42 Billboard's Single Chart, #11 Adult Contemporary).

== Commercial performance ==
Live at Last reached #49 on Billboard's album chart in the autumn of 1977.

== Track listing ==
Side A:

1. Backstage - 0:18
2. "Friends"/"Oh My My" (Mark Klingman, Buzzy Linhart)/(Richard Starkey, Vincent Poncia) - 2:28
3. "Bang You're Dead" (Valerie Simpson, Nickolas Ashford) - 3:15
4. "Birds" (Neil Young) - 4:39
5. Comic Relief (monologue) - 2:38
6. "In the Mood" (Joe Garland, Andy Razaf) - 2:09
7. "Hurry On Down" (Nellie Lutcher) - 2:07

Side B:

1. "Shiver Me Timbers" (Tom Waits) - 4:00
2. The Vicki Eydie Show:
  - "Around the World" (Victor Young, Harold Adamson) - 0:23
  - "Istanbul" (Jimmy Kennedy, Nat Simon) - 0:55
  - "Fiesta In Rio" (Bette Midler, Jerry Blatt) - 1:52
  - "South Seas Scene" / "Hawaiian War Chant" (Rik Carlok)/(Ralph Freed, Prince Leleiohaku, Johnny Noble) - 5:13
  - "Lullaby of Broadway" (Al Dubin, Harry Warren) - 2:00

Intermission:

3. "You're Moving Out Today" (studio recording) (Bette Midler, Carole Bayer Sager, Bruce Roberts) - 2:56

Side C:

1. "Delta Dawn" (Alex Harvey, Larry Collins) - 5:54
2. "Long John Blues" (Tommy George) - 2:36
3. Sophie Tucker Jokes (monologue) - 2:38
4. The Story of Nanette:
  - "Nanette" (Howard Dietz) - 0:54
  - "Alabama Song" (Bertolt Brecht, Kurt Weill) - 1:34
  - "Drinking Again" (Doris Tauber, Johnny Mercer) - 4:25
  - "Mr. Rockefeller" (Bette Midler, Jerry Blatt) - 4:00

Side D:

1. The Story of Nanette (cont.):
  - "Ready to Begin Again"/"Do You Want to Dance?" (Jerry Leiber, Mike Stoller)/(Bobby Freeman) - 3:23
2. Fried Eggs (monologue) - 2:37
3. "Hello In There" (John Prine) - 3:16
4. Finale:
  - "Up the Ladder to the Roof" (Vincent DiMirco, Frank Wilson) - 2:45
  - "Boogie Woogie Bugle Boy" (Don Raye, Hughie Prince) - 3:04
  - "Friends" (Mark Klingman, Buzzy Linhart) - 2:21

== Personnel ==
- Bette Midler - The Divine Miss M. - lead vocals
- The Staggering Harlettes - Sharon Redd, Ula Hedwig, Charlotte Crossley - backing vocals
- The Orchestra - Betsy and the Blowboys
- Don York - musical director, keyboards
- Lou Volpe - guitar
- Miles Krasner - trumpet
- Richard Trifan - keyboards
- Francisco Centeno - bass guitar
- Ira "Buddy" Williams - drums
- Joseph Mero - percussion, vibraphones
- Jaroslav Jakubovic - reed instruments
- Elizabeth Kane - harp

== Production ==
- Lew Hahn - record producer
- Recorded live at The Cleveland Music Hall, Cleveland, Ohio.
- Mobile facilities provided by Fedco Audio Labs
- Jack Malken - recording engineer
- Remote recording produced by Arif Mardin
- Lew Hahn - re-mixing
- Tom Dowd - producer on "You're Moving Out Today"
- Charlie Calello - arranger on "You're Moving Out Today"
- Jimmy Douglass - engineer on "You're Moving Out Today"
- Kenn Duncan - cover photograph
- Steinbicker / Houghton - performance photography
- Bob Defrin / Abie Sussman - art direction
- Jerry Blatt - special material
- Bruce Vilanch - special material
- Bette Midler - special material
- Produced for the stage by Aaron Russo

== Charts ==
Chart performance for Live at Last
Chart (1977)	Peak position
Australian Albums (Kent Music Report)	39
US Billboard 200	49
US Top 100 Albums (Cash Box)	71
US The Album Chart (Record World)	56
