= Ken Hirsch =

American songwriter

Kenneth William Hirsch is an American pop songwriter, pianist and record producer, co-writer of the international 1982 hit "I've Never Been to Me" with Ron Miller. He is also co-writer of the hits "If I Could", "No One in the World" and "Two Less Lonely People in the World". He was born in New York City, attended the Juilliard School of Music and got a BA from Queens College with a major in music.

His other co-writers include Hal David, Howard Greenfield, Doc Pomus, Gerry Goffin, Carole Bayer Sager, Paul Williams, Phil Cody, Wayland Holyfield, Allan Rich, Marti Sharron, Bruce Burch and Robin Lerner.

His songs have been recorded by, amongst others, Celine Dion, Anita Baker, Ray Charles, Charlene, Stevie Wonder, Barbra Streisand, Air Supply, Regina Belle, Dolly Parton, Millie Jackson, Mary J. Blige, Gladys Knight, Latoya London, Phyllis Hyman, Michael Bolton, Plácido Domingo, B. B. King, Johnny Adams, Genya Ravan, Dionne Warwick, Nancy Wilson, Teddy Pendergrass and José Feliciano.

Hirsch composed the music to the musical Daddy Goodness (to lyrics by Ron Miller), which starred Tony Award winners Ted Ross and Clifton Davis and also Freda Payne. It played at the Forrest Theatre in Philadelphia and the National Theatre in Washington, D.C., in 1979. He also co-wrote with Ron Miller the musical Clothespins and Dreams starring Tony Award winner Barney Martin and also Eloise Laws. It played at the Pasadena Civic Auditorium in 1989. In 2012, Ken scored the music to Robin Lerner's lyrics for An Officer and a Gentleman, The Musical, which premiered on May 18, 2012, in Sydney, Australia, and was directed by Simon Phillips. It was nominated for 5 Helpmann Awards, including Best Musical, and won for Best Supporting Actor.

== Selective list of Ken Hirsch songs ==
- "If I Could" (Ron Miller, Ken Hirsch, Marti Sharron) – Nancy Wilson (1988); Carl Anderson (1990); Regina Belle (1993); Barbra Streisand (1997, #1 US album Higher Ground); Celine Dion (2004, #4 US album Miracle; 2004, #10 US album A New Day... Live in Las Vegas); Ray Charles; Michael Bolton; Gladys Knight.
- "No One in the World" (Ken Hirsch, Marti Sharron) - Anita Baker (1986) on the Grammy award-winning album Rapture; Dionne Warwick (1985), Finder of Lost Loves album
- "Two Less Lonely People in the World" (Howard Greenfield, Ken Hirsch) - Air Supply (1982), US #38; KZ Tandingan (2017), #1 Billboard Philippines, used in the film Kita Kita
- "I've Never Been to Me" (Ron Miller, Ken Hirsch) – Charlene (1982), US #3 (three weeks), UK #1, Australia #1 (six weeks), Canada #1 (four weeks), Ireland #1 (three weeks). Soundtrack: "Priscilla, Queen of the Desert"; Soundtrack: "Priscilla, Queen of the Desert - The Musical" (Original Australian Cast Recording) [note: the Broadway version of "Priscilla" replaces the track with "It's Raining Men"]; Soundtrack: Me Without You; Nancy Wilson; Randy Crawford; Lainie Kazan; Marti Caine; Mary MacGregor; The Temptations; used in the film Shrek the Third but not on the soundtrack; used in the film You Were Never Really Here but not on the soundtrack
- "There Is Always One More Time" (Ken Hirsch, Doc Pomus) - B.B.King; Harry Connick Jr.; Johnny Adams - Soundtrack: Bowfinger
- "Can't We Try" (Ken Hirsch, Ron Miller) - Teddy Pendergrass; Thelma Houston; Charlene; Sampled/Ghostface Killah (Wu Tang Clan) (1996)
- "Soon As I Touched Him" (Ken Hirsch, Norma Helms) - Dolly Parton; Fontella Bass; Randy Crawford
- "He Wants To Hear The Words" (Ken Hirsch, Kathy Wakefield) - Millie Jackson, Bloodstone
- "Everybody Loves Me" (Ken Hirsch, Doc Pomus) - Jose Feliciano
- "It All Goes By So Fast" (Ken Hirsch, Jay Levy) - Ray Charles & Mary J. Blige
- "You Were There" (Ken Hirsch, Ron Miller) - Ray Charles & Gladys Knight
- "How I Love The Rain" (Ken Hirsch, Rosie Casey) - LaToya London
- "Before We Say Goodbye" (Ken Hirsch) - Soundtrack: 2gether
- "Used To Be" (Ken Hirsch, Ron Miller) - Stevie Wonder & Charlene
- "Walk Away" (Ken Hirsch, Marti Sharron) - Dionne Warwick; Phyllis Hyman
- "You Loved Away The Pain" (Ken Hirsch, Ron Miller) - Gladys Knight; Hanne Boel
- "A Lady With A Song" (Ken Hirsch, Smokey Bates) - Nancy Wilson
- "It Ain't Easy Comin' Down" (Ron Miller, Ken Hirsch) - Charlene, used in the film The Last American Virgin and later included on the 2004 extended edition of the soundtrack; Patti Boulaye
- "Save Your Nights For Me" (Ken Hirsch, Mark Mueller) - Plácido Domingo
- "I Hate Myself" (Doc Pomus, Ken Hirsch) - Genya Ravan (1972); Anita Lane (2001)
- "Hungry" (Ron Miller, Ken Hirsch) - Charlene; Freda Payne
- "You're My Star" (Kathy Wakefield, Ken Hirsch) - The 5th Dimension
