= Finder of Lost Loves (album) =

Studio album by Dionne Warwick
- Released: January 24, 1985
- Studios: Sunset Sound and Capitol Studios (Hollywood, California); Lion Share Studios and The Village Recorder (Los Angeles, California)
- Length: 44:39
- Label: Arista
- Producers: Burt Bacharach; Richard Landis; Barry Manilow; Carole Bayer Sager; Stevie Wonder

Dionne Warwick chronology
The Woman in Red (1984)	Finder of Lost Loves (1985)	Friends (1985)

Singles from Finder of Lost Loves
- 1. "Finder of Lost Loves" Released: January 1985; 2. "Run to Me" Released: April 1985

Professional ratings
Review scores
Source	Rating
AllMusic	2/5 stars

Finder of Lost Loves is a studio album by American singer Dionne Warwick. It was released by Arista Records on January 24, 1985, in the United States. Warwick worked with Richard Landis, Barry Manilow, and Stevie Wonder on the majority of the album, though she also reunited with Burt Bacharach for the first time in over a decade.

== Background ==
The title track of the album was originally recorded by Warwick with Luther Vandross (who had produced Warwick's previous album How Many Times Can We Say Goodbye in 1983), and used as the theme to the short-lived TV series Finder of Lost Loves (1984–85). The version on this album, which was released as the first single, was recorded as a duet with Warwick and Glenn Jones, though the version with Vandross would be included as a bonus track on the 2014 expanded edition of the album, along with a solo version just featuring Warwick herself.

The album also includes a cover of the Bee Gees song "Run to Me" performed as a duet with Manilow as well as two duets with Wonder, which had previously been released on Wonder's soundtrack album to The Woman in Red. The track "No One in the World" would be covered (with greater success) by vocalist Anita Baker the following year, for her hit album Rapture (1986). Warwick would release the song again on her 1987 album Reservations for Two.

== Commercial performance ==
Finder of Lost Loves peaked at number 106 on the US Billboard 200 chart.

== Track listing ==
Side A
No.	Title	Writer(s)	Producer(s)	Length
1.	"No One in the World"	Ken Hirsch; Marti Sharron	Barry Manilow	3:34
2.	"Without Your Love"	Robert John Lange	Richard Landis	4:43
3.	"Run to Me" (duet with Barry Manilow)	Barry Gibb; Robin Gibb; Maurice Gibb	Manilow	4:36
4.	"Finder of Lost Loves" (duet with Glenn Jones)	Burt Bacharach; Carole Bayer Sager	Bacharach; Sager	4:41
5.	"Love Doesn't Live Here Anymore"	Steve Goldman	Manilow	5:01

Side B
No.	Title	Writer(s)	Producer(s)	Length
6.	"It's You" (duet with Stevie Wonder)	Wonder	Wonder	4:58
7.	"It's Love"	Manilow; Adrienne Anderson	Manilow	3:36
8.	"Bedroom Eyes"	Manilow; Bruce Sussman; Jack Feldman	Manilow	4:45
9.	"Weakness" (duet with Stevie Wonder)	Wonder	Wonder	4:16
10.	"You Made Me Want to Love Again"	Richard Kerr; Norman Gimbel	Manilow	4:29

2014 expanded edition – bonus disc
No.	Title	Writer(s)	Producer(s)	Length
1.	"Broken Bottles"	B. Gibb; R. Gibb; M. Gibb	Manilow	3:51
2.	"Dangerous"	Darrell Brown; Ed Sanford	Manilow	3:42
3.	"Finder of Lost Loves" (Duet Version with Luther Vandross)	Bacharach; Sager	Bacharach; Sager	5:04
4.	"Finder of Lost Loves" (Solo Version)	Bacharach; Sager	Bacharach; Sager	4:42
5.	"No One in the World" (Alternate Version)	Hirsch; Sharron	Manilow	3:15
6.	"Without Your Love" (7" Version)	Lange	Landis	4:07
7.	"Run to Me" (7" Version)	B. Gibb; R. Gibb; M. Gibb	Manilow	4:24
8.	"It's Love" (7" Version)	Manilow; Anderson	Manilow	3:35
9.	"Bedroom Eyes" (Alternate Version)	Manilow; Sussman; Feldman	Manilow	5:32
10.	"No One in the World" (Instrumental)	Hirsch; Marti Sharron	Manilow	3:36
11.	"Run to Me" (Instrumental)	B. Gibb; R. Gibb; M. Gibb	Manilow	4:46
12.	"Without Your Love" (Instrumental)	Lange	Landis	4:59

== Personnel and credits ==
Musicians

- Dionne Warwick – vocals, backing vocals (1, 7)
- Artie Butler – acoustic piano (1)
- Greg Phillinganes – Rhodes electric piano (1, 3, 5, 7, 8, 10), acoustic piano (4, 7)
- Robbie Buchanan – Fender Rhodes (2), synthesizers (4)
- John Philip Shenale – synthesizer programming (2)
- Barry Manilow – acoustic piano (3, 8, 10), vocals (3), backing vocals (3), synthesizers (8)
- Stevie Wonder – acoustic piano (6, 9), synthesizers (6, 9), Kurzweil 250 (6), harmonica (6), vocals (6, 9)
- Keith Harris – synthesizer programming (6, 9)
- Abdoulaye Soumare – programming assistant (6, 9)
- Randy Kerber – synthesizers (7)
- Gary Pickus – synthesizers (7)
- Isaiah Sanders – synthesizers (9)
- Charles Fearing – guitars (1, 3, 5, 7, 8, 10)
- Paul Jackson Jr. – guitars (2)
- Dean Parks – guitars (4)
- Tim May – guitars (7)
- Neil Stubenhaus – bass (1, 2, 4, 7)
- Nathan East – bass (3, 5, 8, 10)
- Nathan Watts – bass (6, 9)
- Ed Greene – drums (1, 3, 5, 7, 8, 10)
- John Robinson – drums (2)
- Carlos Vega – drums (4)
- James Allen – drums (6, 9)
- Alan Estes – percussion (1, 3, 5, 7, 8, 10)
- Bob Malach – saxophone (9)
- Endre Granat – concertmaster (4)
- Tommy Funderburk – backing vocals (1, 3, 5, 7, 8, 10)
- Tom Kelly – backing vocals (1, 3, 5, 7, 8, 10)
- Richard Page – backing vocals (1–3, 5, 7, 8, 10)
- Jim Haas – backing vocals (2)
- Jon Joyce – backing vocals (2)
- Glenn Jones – vocals (4)
- Windy Barnes – backing vocals (9)
- Alex Brown – backing vocals (9)
- Lynn Davis – backing vocals (9)
- Susaye Greene – backing vocals (9)

Music arrangements

- Artie Butler – arrangements (1, 3, 5, 10), orchestrations (1, 3, 5, 10)
- Barry Manilow – arrangements (1, 3, 5, 10), rhythm track arrangements (7)
- Charles Calello – arrangements (2)
- Jeremy Lubbock – string arrangements (6)
- Gary Pickus – rhythm track arrangements (7)
- Greg Poree – string arrangements (9)

Production

- Barry Manilow – producer (1, 3, 5, 7, 8, 10)
- Michael DeLugg – associate producer (1, 3, 5, 7, 8, 10)
- Richard Landis – producer (2)
- Burt Bacharach – producer (4)
- Carole Bayer Sager – producer (4)
- Stevie Wonder – producer (6, 9)
- Eric Borenstein – project coordinator (1, 3, 5, 7, 8, 10)
- Marc Hulett – personal assistant to Barry Manilow (1, 3, 5, 7, 8, 10)
- Kathy Anaya – production coordinator (2)
- Frank DeCaro – music coordinator (4)
- Donn Davenport – art direction
- Harry Langdon – photography
- Clifford Peterson – hair
- Wynona Price – make-up
- Jane Hoffman – stylist
- Gene Ewing – outfit (back cover)

Technical credits

- Michael DeLugg – engineer (1, 3, 5, 7, 8, 10)
- David Cole – engineer (2)
- John Guess – engineer (4)
- Gary Olazabal – engineer (6, 9), mixing (6, 9)
- Bill Jackson – assistant engineer (1, 3, 5, 7, 8, 10)
- Tom Nist – assistant engineer (1, 3, 5, 7, 8, 10)
- Steve Schmitt – assistant engineer (4)
- Bob Harlan – assistant engineer (6, 9)

== Charts ==
Chart performance for Finder of Lost Loves
Chart (1985)	Peak position
UK Albums (Official Charts)	86
US Top Pop Albums (Billboard)	106
US Top Black Albums (Billboard)	50
US Top 75 Black Contemporary Albums (Cash Box)	46
