= Rapture (Anita Baker album) =

1986 studio album by American singer Anita Baker

Studio album by Anita Baker
- Released: March 20, 1986
- Recorded: 1985
- Studios: Yamaha R & D Studio (Glendale, California); Music Grinder Studios (Hollywood, California); United Sound Systems (Detroit, Michigan)
- Genres: R&B; soul; quiet storm
- Length: 37:09
- Label: Elektra
- Producers: Michael J. Powell; Marti Sharron; Gary Skardina

Anita Baker chronology
The Songstress (1983)	Rapture (1986)	Giving You the Best That I Got (1988)

Singles from Rapture
- 1. "Watch Your Step" Released: 1986; 2. "Sweet Love" Released: May 27, 1986; 3. "Caught Up in the Rapture" Released: October 3, 1986; 4. "Same Ole Love (365 Days a Year)" Released: February 1987; 5. "No One in the World" Released: July 1987

Rapture is the second album by American vocalist Anita Baker, released in 1986. This became Baker's breakout album, earning her two Grammy Awards. The album's first track, "Sweet Love", was a top 10 Billboard hit in addition to winning a Grammy Award. The album has sold over eight million copies worldwide, including five million in the US alone.

== Background ==
In 1984, while Baker was signed to Beverly Glen Music which had released her 1983 album The Songstress, she was offered a considerably better recording contract with Elektra Records, part of Warner Communications. As she was having some difficulties with Beverly Glen, she accepted Warner's offer and notified Beverly Glen that she was no longer willing to perform under the terms of her contract with them. As Baker commenced working on her first album for Elektra, teaming up with her former Chapter 8 colleague Michael Powell as producer, Beverly Glen Music then attempted to sue Baker and subsequently Elektra/Warner to prevent the release of any new recordings by her. Baker's album was finished as the case was heard, and ultimately Beverly Glen Music's legal actions failed. The case was decided March 19, 1986 in favor of Baker and Elektra/Warner Communications Rapture was released the following day.

== Critical reception ==
Retrospective professional ratings
Review scores
Source	Rating
AllMusic	5/5 stars
Christgau's Record Guide	B−
Encyclopedia of Popular Music	4/5 stars
MusicHound R&B	4.5/5 stars
Pitchfork	9.0/10

In a contemporary review for Rolling Stone, Rob Hoerburger regarded Rapture as a relatively "modest" album compared to more histrionic female singers, while praising the symbiotic relationship Baker shared with her band. Occasionally, he believed, the groove-based music lacked variety, and the singer drifted into "some superfluous scatting and pseudo-jazz harmony", but Hoerburger ultimately deemed her "an acquired but enduring taste". At the end of 1986, Rapture was ranked number 2 among the "Albums of the Year" by NME. It was voted the 23rd best album of the year in the Pazz & Jop, an annual poll of American critics, published by The Village Voice. Robert Christgau, the newspaper's lead music critic, was less impressed and viewed the record as merely a soulful, sexier version of soft rock and easy listening: "it's all husky, burnished mood, the fulfillment of the quiet-storm format black radio ... a reification of the human voice as vehicle of an expression purer than expression ever ought to be".

In 1989, Rapture was ranked number 36 on Rolling Stone's list of the 100 greatest albums from the 1980s. The same publication would later include the album as number 404 on their 2020 list of 500 Greatest Albums of All Time. In retrospect, AllMusic's Alex Henderson said, "Rapture's tremendous success made it clear that there was still a sizeable market for adult-oriented, more traditional R&B singing." According to The Mojo Collection (2007), "when provocative new trends in black music were exploding from the street by the month, Baker kept her head and made a traditional (i.e., with its roots in the '70s) soul record with brooding, slow-burn minor tunes of romantic celebration and earthy longing." According to CBC Music journalist Amanda Parris, "Baker defined quiet storm in the '80's and her album Rapture is one of the subgenre's milestones." Pitchfork placed the album at number 149 on its list of The 200 Best Albums of the 1980s.

== Commercial performance ==
Rapture peaked at number 11 on the Billboard 200 in the United States and number 13 on the UK Albums Chart. Promoted with two hit singles in "Sweet Love" and "Caught Up in the Rapture", the album received significant airplay on both black radio and Top 40 formats, unlike Baker's 1983 debut The Songstress. By October 1987, Rapture had sold three million copies. It propelled Baker to stardom in soul and pop music during the late 1980s, winning two Grammy Awards and eventually sold over eight million copies worldwide.

== Track listing ==
No.	Title	Writer(s)	Length
1.	"Sweet Love"	Anita Baker, Louis A. Johnson, Gary Bias	4:26
2.	"You Bring Me Joy"	David Lasley	4:24
3.	"Caught Up in the Rapture"	Garry Glenn, Dianne Quander	5:17
4.	"Been So Long"	Baker	5:07
5.	"Mystery"	Rod Temperton	4:56
6.	"No One in the World" (Produced by Marti Sharron and Gary Skardina)	Ken Hirsch, Marti Sharron	4:10
7.	"Same Ole Love (365 Days a Year)"	Marilyn McLeod, Darryl K. Roberts	4:05
8.	"Watch Your Step"	Baker	4:54

== Personnel ==
=== Musicians ===
- Anita Baker – lead vocals, backing vocals (1–6), keyboards (8)
- Sir Dean Gant – keyboards (1, 2, 4, 7, 8), arrangements
- Vernon Fails – keyboards (3, 5)
- Randy Kerber – keyboards (6)
- Greg Phillinganes – synthesizer overdubs (6)
- Paul Chiten – synthesizer overdubs (6)
- Greg Moore – guitars (1, 2, 7)
- Michael J. Powell – guitars (3, 5), finger pops (5)
- Donald Griffin – guitars (4, 8)
- Dean Parks – lead guitar (6)
- Paul Jackson Jr. – rhythm guitar (6)
- Freddie Washington – bass (1, 2, 7)
- David B. Washington – bass (3, 5, 8)
- Jimmy Haslip – bass (4)
- Neil Stubenhaus – bass (6)
- Ricky Lawson – drums (1, 2, 4, 7, 8)
- Arthur Marbury – drums (3, 5)
- John Robinson – drums (6)
- Paulinho da Costa – percussion (1, 2, 6–8)
- Lorenzo Brown – percussion (3)
- Lawrence Fratangelo – percussion (3, 5)
- Alpha L. Perkins – finger pops (5)
- Holli L. Perkins – finger pops (5)
- Warren Woods – finger pops (5)
- Don Myrick – saxophone (2)
- Gerald Albright – saxophone (8)
- Jim Gilstrap – backing vocals (1, 2, 4, 7, 8)
- Bunny Hull – backing vocals (1, 2, 4, 7, 8)
- Daryl Phinnessee – backing vocals (1, 2, 4, 6–8)
- Alex Brown – backing vocals (2, 8)
- Vesta Williams – backing vocals (2, 8)
- Natalie Jackson – backing vocals (5)
- Lynn Davis – backing vocals (6)
- Phillip Ingram – backing vocals (6)

=== Production ===
- Anita Baker – executive producer
- Michael J. Powell – producer (1–5, 7, 8), mixing
- Marti Sharron – producer (6)
- Gary Skardina – producer (6), engineer (6)
- Barney Perkins – engineer (1–5, 7, 8), mixing
- Robert Feist – engineer (6)
- Keith "KC" Cohen – assistant engineer (1–5, 7, 8)
- Fred Law – assistant engineer (1–5, 7, 8)
- Tony Ray – assistant engineer (1–5, 7, 8)
- Keith Seppanen – assistant engineer (1–5, 7, 8)
- Bernie Grundman – mastering at Bernie Grundman Mastering (Hollywood, California)
- Hale Milgrim – creative director
- Carol Friedman – art direction, photography
- Sue Keston – design
- Lisa Silvestri – stylist
- Donyale McRae – hair, make-up
- Sherwin Bash – management

== Accolades ==
=== Grammy Awards ===
Year	Nominee / work	Award	Result
1987	Rapture	Best Female R&B Vocal Performance	Won
1987	"Sweet Love"	Best R&B Song	Won

=== American Music Awards ===
Year	Nominee / work	Award	Result
1987	Anita Baker	Favorite Soul/R&B Female Artist	Nominated
1987	Rapture	Favorite Soul/R&B Album	Nominated
1988	Anita Baker	Favorite Soul/R&B Female Artist	Won
1988	Rapture	Favorite Soul/R&B Album	Won

== Charts ==
=== Weekly charts ===
Weekly chart performance for Rapture
Chart (1986–1987)	Position
Australian Kent Music Report	33
Canadian RPM Albums Chart	25
European Albums (Music & Media)	26
Hungarian Physical Albums (MAHASZ)	23
New Zealand Albums Chart	12
Swedish Albums Chart	32
UK Albums Chart	13
US Billboard 200	11
US Billboard R&B Albums	1
US Billboard Jazz Albums	24
West German Media Control Albums Chart	50

=== Year-end charts ===
1986 year-end chart performance for Rapture
Chart (1986)	Position
US Billboard 200	59
US Top R&B/Hip-Hop Albums (Billboard)	7

1987 year-end chart performance for Rapture
Chart (1987)	Position
US Billboard 200	9
US Top R&B/Hip-Hop Albums (Billboard)	3

1988 year-end chart performance for Rapture
Chart (1988)	Position
US Billboard 200	51
US Top R&B/Hip-Hop Albums (Billboard)	57

== Certifications and sales ==
Certifications and sales for Rapture
Region	Certification	Certified units/sales
Canada (Music Canada)	Gold	50,000^{^}
United Kingdom (BPI)	Platinum	300,000^{^}
United States (RIAA)	5× Platinum	5,000,000^{^}
Summaries
Worldwide	—	8,000,000
^{^} Shipments figures based on certification alone.

== See also ==
- List of number-one R&B albums of 1986 (U.S.)
