= Expectations of Love =

2000 studio album by David Lasley

Studio album by David Lasley
- Released: 2000 (Expansion Records); 2001 (Thursday Market Music)
- Studio: A&M Studios
- Genre: Pop; R&B; soul; smooth jazz
- Length: 61:21
- Label: Expansion
- Producer: David Lasley; Roxanne Seeman; Michael Kamen; Jay Oliver; Stephan Oberhoff

David Lasley chronology
Back to Blue-Eyed Soul – Collected Works/1966–1999 (2000)	Expectations of Love (2000)	Demos Volume 2 (2005)

Expectations of Love is the sixth studio album by American singer and songwriter David Lasley.

== Overview ==
The album was released in 2000 in the United Kingdom by Expansion Records and in 2001 in the United States by Thursday Market Music.

Several of the tracks were originally created as songwriting demos, either written by Lasley or co-written with other songwriters. Among the 13 tracks, included in the album are the original versions of Dancin' On The Smooth Edge by Whitney Houston and Meant For You by Debra Laws.

== Critical reception ==
Professional ratings
Review scores
Source	Rating
AllMusic	3/5 stars

Jonathan Widran of AllMusic rated the album 3 out of 5 stars, calling Lasley "one of the better-known" backing vocalists and praising the album's hooks and emotional delivery. He described the sound as having a "warm, simple '70s or early-'80s" quality, highlighting Lasley's voice as deserving more recognition in the foreground of popular music.

The Grand Rapids Press described the album as a "smooth-jazz, pop and R&B offering" that "made a splash on jazz radio in Great Britain" upon its earlier UK release.

Glenn Hoskins and Barry Towler of Record Corner noted Lasley's "passionate and soaring falsetto" and affirmed the album's appeal for fans of soul and adult pop.

== Tracklist ==
Expectations of Love track listing
No.	Title	Writer(s)	Length
1.	"What's It Gonna Take"	David Lasley; Marsha Malamet; Robin Lerner	4:19
2.	"Expectations Of Love"	Philip Bailey; Roxanne Seeman	5:05
3.	"Good Magic"	Lasley; Joshua Kadison	5:34
4.	"Meant For You"	Lasley; Seeman	2:53
5.	"Revelations"	Seeman; Jay Oliver	5:05
6.	"Will To Survive"	Seeman; Oliver; Jean-Paul Dreau	4:12
7.	"Dancin' On The Smooth Edge"	Lasley; Robert Long	6:12
8.	"Joey (I Believe In Our Love)"	Lasley; Kathy Wakefield	4:20
9.	"Night Of Our Lives"	Seeman; Oliver; Dominic Messinger	5:18
10.	"Change All Of That"	Lasley; Lerner; Malamet	5:09
11.	"Love's Forever"	Lasley	5:05
12.	"When Will I Know Love"	Lasley; Michael Kamen	2:57
13.	"The Right Way"	Lasley; Oliver	5:23
Total length:			61:21

== Personnel ==
- David Lasley – vocals (all tracks), background vocals, producer (3, 4, 8, 10, 11), arranger (7)
- David Benoit – keyboards (4, 8, 11), producer (11)
- Jay Oliver – arranger (2, 5, 6, 9, 10, 13), producer (3, 5, 6, 9, 10), composer, programming
- Roxanne Seeman – composer, producer (2, 4, 5, 6, 9)
- Michael Kamen – composer, producer, arranger (12)
- Marsha Malamet – programming (1), arranger (1), producer (10)
- Joshua Kadison – composer, producer (3)
- Bobby Watson – bass (4)
- David Garibaldi – drums (8)
- Gary Ferguson – drums (4)
- Marty Walsh – guitar (4, 8)
- Todd Robinson – guitar (4)
- Phillip Ballou – background vocals (5)
- Arnold McCuller – background vocals (2, 8)
- Myrna Smith – background vocals (2, 7)
- Diana Grasselli – background vocals (10)
- Joann Harris – background vocals (7, 8)
- John West – background vocals (3, 10)
- Charlotte Crossley – background vocals (7)
- Lynn Sigman – background vocals (2)
- Stephan Oberhoff – programming (1), producer
- Dominic Messinger – composer, producer (9)
- Robin Lerner – composer, producer (10)
- Eddie del Barrio – string arrangements (2)
- Dave Iveland - engineer (4, 7, 8)
- John Bach - engineer (11)
- Bob Suede - engineer (13)
