= Soldiers on the Moon =

Soldiers On The Moon

Studio album by David Lasley
- Released: October 21, 1989
- Studios: Ocean Way Studios; Rusk
- Length: 48:46
- Label: Pony Canyon Records
- Producer: Jeffrey Weber

David Lasley chronology
Raindance (1984)	Soldiers On The Moon (1989)

Soldiers on the Moon is the third studio album by the American singer and songwriter David Lasley, released in 1989 on Pony Canyon Records. It was met with critical acclaim by music journalists including Stephen Holden of The New York Times, among others.

Lasley wrote three of the eleven songs including the title track and a cover of his song "You Bring Me Joy". The remaining songs are covers including "It's Too Late", "Since I Fell For You", “I Think It's Gonna Rain Today" and "God Bless The Child". Agenda Records released the album in the US in 1990. In 2000, Cool Sounds reissued the album in Japan.

Soldiers On The Moon was produced by Jeffrey Weber as a live to 2-track studio recording at Ocean Way Studios. The rhythm section included Jeff Porcaro, Abe Laboriel, Luis Conte, Bob Mann, and Marty Walsh.Luther Vandross is the arranger of the background vocals. David Benoit appears on every track.

== Songs and style ==
The opening song is a cover of Carole King's song "It's Too Late" which Holden singles out as the "outstanding cut" calling it "a dreamy extended rendition...that uses a fragment of King's 'Will You Still Love Me Tomorrow?" as an introduction."

== Critical reception ==
Stephen Holden of The New York Times called it "a lushly produced collection of ballads"...with "diaphanous textures and languid tempos" that "echo the ultra-romantic style" of Luther Vandross' albums, whose presence "can be felt all over" the record. Alex Henderson of Cashbox described the album as "relaxed R&B with Jazz leanings".Gavin Report praised the album remarking "Lasley's extraordinarily wide range led to him writing "You Bring Me Joy" which was covered...by Anita Baker" and on "the torchy, smoldering Billie Holiday ballad "God Bless The Child." Jonathan Widran of AllMusic praised the album for its "sensuous originals" and "dynamite covers of tunes" saying "Lasley's The Stylistics-like vocals are richest on the soaring parts of the ballads."
