= Caught Up in the Rapture =

Single by Anita Baker

from the album Rapture
- B-side: "Mystery"
- Released: October 3, 1986
- Recorded: 1985
- Genre: Quiet storm
- Length: 5:17 (album version): 4:08 (single version)
- Label: Elektra
- Songwriters: Garry Glenn, Dianne Quander
- Producer: Michael J. Powell

Anita Baker singles chronology
"Sweet Love" (1986)	"Caught Up in the Rapture" (1986)	"Same Ole Love (365 Days a Year)" (1987)

Music video
- "Caught Up in the Rapture" on YouTube

"Caught Up in the Rapture" is a 1986 ballad song by American R&B/soul singer Anita Baker. It was released as the follow-up single after "Sweet Love" from her album Rapture.

== Chart performance ==
"Caught Up in the Rapture" was Baker's third top ten R&B single, peaking at number six on the Billboard Hot Black Singles chart, and number nine on the Billboard Adult Contemporary Singles chart. It was also a minor success on the Billboard Hot 100 charts, reaching #37 on the week of February 14, 1987.

== Personnel ==
- Lead and backing vocals: Anita Baker
- Drums: Arthur Marbury
- Percussion: Lawrence Fratangelo
- Bass: David B. Washington
- Guitar: Michael J. Powell
- Keyboards: Vernon D. Fails
- Arrangements by Sir Gant

== Charts ==
=== Weekly charts ===
Chart (1986–1987)	Peak position
UK Singles (The Official Charts Company)	51
US Billboard Hot 100	37
US Adult Contemporary (Billboard)	9
US Hot Black Singles (Billboard)	6

=== Year-end charts ===
Chart (1987)	Position
US Hot Black Singles (Billboard)	41
