= Sometimes Late at Night =

Studio album by Carole Bayer Sager
- Released: 1981
- Recorded: 1981
- Genre: Pop
- Length: 42:36
- Labels: Boardwalk/CBS (LP); Victor Entertainment (Remastered CD in Japan)
- Producers: Burt Bacharach, Brooks Arthur, Michael Jackson

Carole Bayer Sager chronology
...Too (1979)	Sometimes Late at Night (1981)

Sometimes Late at Night is the third and last solo album by songwriter Carole Bayer Sager, released in 1981. Singles from the album were Stronger Than Before (later recorded by Dionne Warwick and Chaka Khan), and Easy To Love Again. The track co-written with Neil Diamond, On The Way To The Sky, served as the title to his album released a few months later and reached the top 40 as a single in 1982.

The producer and composer was Burt Bacharach. After this album, they married and wrote many songs including "Arthur's Theme (Best That You Can Do)" and "That's What Friends Are For", until their divorce.

Sometimes Late at Night is a concept album, which flows from song to song, with no breaks in between throughout each side of the LP or cassette edition. The US CD release suffered from bad packaging, incorrect information and skips in the CD track; but the Japanese-remastered CD (now re-released with paper jacket) was perfect, and included the correct and original lyrics.

== Track listing ==
Side One

1. Prologue
2. "I Won't Break"
  (Carole Bayer Sager, Burt Bacharach, Peter Allen)
  Drums: Jeff Porcaro, Bass guitar: Lee Sklar, Guitars: Lee Ritenour, Fender Rhodes: Michael Lang, Piano: Burt Bacharach, Synthesizers: Ed Walsh, Saxophone: George Young, Background Vocals: Richard Page, Steve George
3. "Just Friends"
  (Carole Bayer Sager, Burt Bacharach)
  Produced by Michael Jackson and Burt Bacharach
  Drums: Jim Keltner, Bass guitar: Reinie Press, Guitars: Paul Jackson, Jr., Piano: Burt Bacharach, Background Vocals: Michael Jackson
4. "Tell Her"
  (Carole Bayer Sager, Burt Bacharach, Peter Allen)
  Drums: Jeff Porcaro, Bass guitar: Lee Sklar, Electric Guitars: Lee Ritenour, Piano: Burt Bacharach, Fender Rhodes: David Foster, Percussion: Paulinho Da Costa, Background Vocals: Franne Golde, Joann Harris
  Strings and Horns arranged by David Foster and Jerry Hey
5. "Somebody's Been Lying"
  (Carole Bayer Sager, Burt Bacharach)
6. "On The Way To The Sky"
  (Carole Bayer Sager, Neil Diamond)
  Background Vocals: Melissa Manchester, Bruce Roberts
7. "You And Me (We Wanted It All)"
  (Carole Bayer Sager, Peter Allen)

Side Two

1. "Sometimes Late At Night"
  (Carole Bayer Sager, Burt Bacharach)
2. "Wild Again"
  (Carole Bayer Sager, Burt Bacharach)
3. "Easy To Love Again"
  (Carole Bayer Sager, Burt Bacharach)
4. "Stronger Than Before"
  (Carole Bayer Sager, Burt Bacharach, Bruce Roberts)
5. "You Don't Know Me"
  (Carole Bayer Sager, Burt Bacharach)
6. Reprise

Produced by Burt Bacharach and Brooks Arthur except "Just Friends".
