= You Bring Me Joy =

You Bring Me Joy may refer to:

- "You Bring Me Joy" (Anita Baker song), 1980
- "You Bring Me Joy" (Mary J. Blige song), 1994
- "You Bring Me Joy" (Amelia Lily song), 2012
