= Intimacy (Bruce Roberts album) =

Studio album by Bruce Roberts
- Released: September 19, 1995
- Studio: The Bedroom and Andora Studios (Hollywood, California); Westlake Studios (Los Angeles, California); Circle Seven Recording (Pacific Palisades, California); Chartmaker Studios (Malibu, California); The Hit Factory (New York City, New York); Porterhouse (Surrey, England)
- Genre: Pop rock, dance
- Length: 43:39
- Label: Atlantic
- Producer: Bruce Roberts; Tom "T-Bone" Wolk; David Foster

Bruce Roberts chronology
Cool Fool (1980)	Intimacy (1995)

Intimacy is the third studio album by American singer Bruce Roberts, released on September 19, 1995. It featured musical and vocal contributions by many notable artists.

== Track listing ==
1. "Intimacy" (Bruce Roberts, Junior Miles) - 4:18
2. "Real" (Roberts, Allee Willis) - 4:34
3. "Let Me Steal Your Heart" (Roberts) - 2:32
4. "When Love Goes" (Roberts, Miles) - 4:04
5. "My One Joy" (Roberts) - 4:29
6. "When the Money's Gone" (Roberts, Donna Weiss) - 5:42
7. "Raise the Population" (Roberts) - 4:14
8. "All Through the Night" (Roberts, Donna Summer) - 4:42
9. "Emerald" (Roberts) - 4:27
10. "The Man Who Loves You" (Roberts, Miles) - 4:25

== Personnel ==
Musicians

- Bruce Roberts – lead vocals, acoustic piano, keyboards, synthesizers, drum programming
- Steve Deutsch – keyboards, synthesizers
- David Foster – keyboards, synthesizers
- Pete Gleadall – keyboards, synthesizers, drum programming
- James Newton Howard – keyboards, synthesizers
- Elton John – keyboards, synthesizers
- Greg O'Connor – keyboards, synthesizers
- John Schreiner – keyboards, synthesizers
- David Tobocman – keyboards, synthesizers, drum programming
- Paul Jackson Jr. – guitars
- Davey Johnstone – guitars
- Ramon Stagnaro – guitars
- Michael Thompson – guitars
- Tom "T-Bone" Wolk – guitars, bass
- Neil Stubenhaus – bass
- Jimmy Bralower – drum programming
- Simon Franglen – drum programming
- Novi Novog – viola

Background vocalists

- Bruce Roberts – backing vocals
- k.d. lang – harmony vocals (1)
- All-4-One – backing vocals (4)
- Elton John – backing vocals (6, 9)
- Nickolas Ashford and Valerie Simpson – backing vocals
- James Ingram – backing vocals
- David Lasley – backing vocals
- Brenda Russell – backing vocals
- Myrna Smith – backing vocals
- Luther Vandross – backing vocals

Production

- Bruce Roberts – producer
- Tom "T-Bone" Wolk – producer (3, 7)
- David Foster – producer (4)
- Tim Leitner – engineer (1–3, 5–10)
- Chris Porter – engineer (1–3, 5–10), mixing (1–3, 5–10)
- David Tobocman – engineer (1–3, 5–10)
- Felipe Elgueta – engineer (4)
- David Reitzas – engineer (4)
- Mick Guzauski – mixing (4)
- Dave Dashinger – additional engineer (1–3, 5–10)
- Bob Schaper – additional engineer (1–3, 5–10)
- Carl Glanville – assistant engineer (1–3, 5–10)
- Michael Mason – assistant engineer (1–3, 5–10)
- Steve McNichol – assistant engineer (1–3, 5–10)
- Stephen Marcussen – mastering at Precision Mastering (Hollywood, California)
- Herb Ritts – photography
