= Carole Bayer Sager (album) =

Studio album by Carole Bayer Sager
- Released: 1977
- Studios: Record Plant, Los Angeles
- Genres: Pop; rock
- Length: 33:59
- Label: Elektra Records
- Producer: Brooks Arthur

Carole Bayer Sager chronology
| Carole Bayer Sager (1977) | ...Too (1978) |

Singles from Carole Bayer Sager
- 1. "You're Moving Out Today"; 2. "Don't Wish Too Hard"; 3. "I'd Rather Leave While I'm in Love"

Professional ratings
Review scores
| Source | Rating |
|---|---|
| AllMusic | 4/5 stars |

Carole Bayer Sager is the debut studio album by American songwriter Carole Bayer Sager, released in 1977 by Elektra Records. It included the song "You're Moving Out Today", which became a 1977 Australian number one single and also reached number 6 in the UK Singles Chart. The album itself was also a success in Australia, reaching the top 10, as well as receiving a gold certification there. It was produced by Brooks Arthur.

== Track listing ==
All tracks are written by Carole Bayer Sager, with additional contributors noted.

Side one
| No. | Title | Writer(s) | Length |
|---|---|---|---|
| 1. | "Come in from the Rain" | Melissa Manchester | 2:48 |
| 2. | "Until the Next Time" | Johnny Vastano | 3:30 |
| 3. | "Don't Wish Too Hard" | Peter Allen | 4:04 |
| 4. | "Sweet Alibis" | Marvin Hamlisch | 3:46 |
| 5. | "Aces" | Bruce Roberts | 3:20 |

Side two
| No. | Title | Writer(s) | Length |
|---|---|---|---|
| 6. | "I'd Rather Leave While I'm in Love" | Allen | 2:48 |
| 7. | "Steal Away Again" | Roberts; Bette Midler | 4:16 |
| 8. | "You're Moving Out Today" | Roberts; Midler | 3:33 |
| 9. | "Shy as a Violet" | Allen | 3:06 |
| 10. | "Home to Myself" | Manchester | 2:48 |

== Personnel ==
=== Musicians ===
- Carole Bayer Sager – lead vocals, background vocals (5, 9)
- Lee Ritenour – acoustic guitar (1, 5, 6, 10), electric guitar (6, 10), guitar (4), mandolin (4)
- Johnny Vastano – acoustic guitar (2), background vocals (2)
- Al Gorgoni – acoustic guitar (7)
- Thom Rotella – acoustic guitar (8, 9), electric guitar (8)
- Jerry Friedman – acoustic guitar (9)
- Bruce Roberts – background vocals (5–8), piano (5–8)
- Madeline Kahn – background vocals (7)
- Abigail Haness – background vocals (3)
- Brenda Russell – background vocals (2, 3)
- Melissa Manchester – background vocals (2, 10), harpsichord (10), arrangements (10), piano (1, 10)
- Tony Orlando – background vocals (3)
- Peter Allen – background vocals (9), piano (3, 9)
- Bette Midler – background vocals (9)
- Lee Sklar – bass guitar (1, 2, 5, 6, 10)
- Bob Cranshaw – bass guitar (3, 9)
- Emory Gordy – bass guitar (4)
- Will Lee – bass guitar (7, 8)
- Allan Schwartsberg – cabasa (3), drums (3)
- Marvin Hamlisch – celesta (4), electric piano (4), piano (4)
- Paul Buckmaster – strings and horns arrangements (1, 2, 4–10), synthesizer (4)
- Gene Page – strings and horns arrangements (3)
- Alan Estes – congas (3–7), percussion (3, 9)
- Russ Kunkel – drums (2, 6, 10)
- Jim Keltner – drums (4, 5)
- Roy Markowitz – drums (7, 8)
- Andy Newmark – drums (9)
- Lance Quinn – electric guitar (3)
- Jerry Friedman – electric guitar (7)
- Nicky Hopkins – electric piano (2), piano (2)
- Artie Butler – organ (2)
- Bob Margouleff – programming (4)
- Hugh McCracken – slide guitar (8)
- Garnett Brown – trombone (8)

=== Production ===
- Ivy Skoff – production coordination
- Brooks Arthur – sound engineer, producer
- Bob Merritt – sound engineer
- David Thoener – sound engineer
- David Latman – sound engineer
- Connie Pappas – management
- John Reid Ent – management

=== Design ===
- Tony Lane – art direction, design
- Anne Garner – design
- Claude Mougin – photography
- David Alexander – photography

== Charts ==
| Chart (1977) | Peak position |
|---|---|
| Australia (Kent Music Report) | 4 |

== Certifications and sales ==
| Region | Certification | Certified units/sales |
|---|---|---|
| Australia (ARIA) | Gold | 20,000^{^} |
^{^} Shipments figures based on certification alone.
