= WSTA =

Radio station in Charlotte Amalie, U.S. Virgin Islands

- Charlotte Amalie, U.S. Virgin Islands; United States
- Frequency: 1340 kHz
- Branding: WSTA Radio 1340AM

Programming
- Format: Variety
- Affiliations: ABC Radio

Ownership
- Owner: Ottley Communications Corporation; (OCC Acquisitions, Inc.)

History
- First air date: July 26, 1950; 76 years ago

Technical information
- Licensing authority: FCC
- Facility ID: 50756
- Class: B
- Power: 1,000 watts (unlimited)
- Transmitter coordinates: 18°20′10″N 64°57′17″W

Links
- Public license information: Public file; LMS

WSTA (1340 AM, "The People's Station") is a radio station licensed to serve Charlotte Amalie, United States Virgin Islands. The station is owned by Ottley Communications Corporation, and the station's broadcast license is held by OCC Acquisitions, Inc.

WSTA was the first station to broadcast in the Virgin Islands. Airing a full-service variety format, the station has long been recognized for its community orientation and public service, remaining on the air through major hurricanes.

WSTA is the Virgin Islands' Primary Entry Point station in the Emergency Alert System.

== History ==
On September 7, 1949, the Federal Communications Commission authorized William N. Greer to build and operate a new 250-watt radio station on 1340 kHz in Charlotte Amalie. Greer had not intended to build a 250-watt station; he had filed for just 50 watts, and the FCC at first blush appeared to allow such a service in the U.S. Virgin Islands, but two other applications for higher-power stations were received, along with objections from the National Association of Broadcasters and the International Brotherhood of Electrical Workers, and the FCC vacated its original order. In advance, the Virgin Islands Daily News praised the arrival of radio to the island of St. Thomas as "a significant advancement in the life of community" that would "influence the future to an extent not now dreamt of even by its founder". WSTA began broadcasting on the afternoon of July 26, 1950.

Greer lost money in his first two years of running WSTA, but it was warmly welcomed and provided a valuable and eclectic broadcasting service. The studios were open-air, and wild animals including goats and chickens sometimes wandered in during broadcasts. A 1951 article in The New York Times described it as the "pride of St. Thomas", a station with "probably the greatest public acceptance" of any in the United States. It described one of the station's foremost personalities in its early years: "Mango Jones", whose real name was Ron de Lugo, who would later enter politics and serve as the U.S. Virgin Islands delegate to Congress. WSTA was a "secret affiliate" of NBC and the Mutual Broadcasting System, receiving network newscasts two days late by air from Miami.

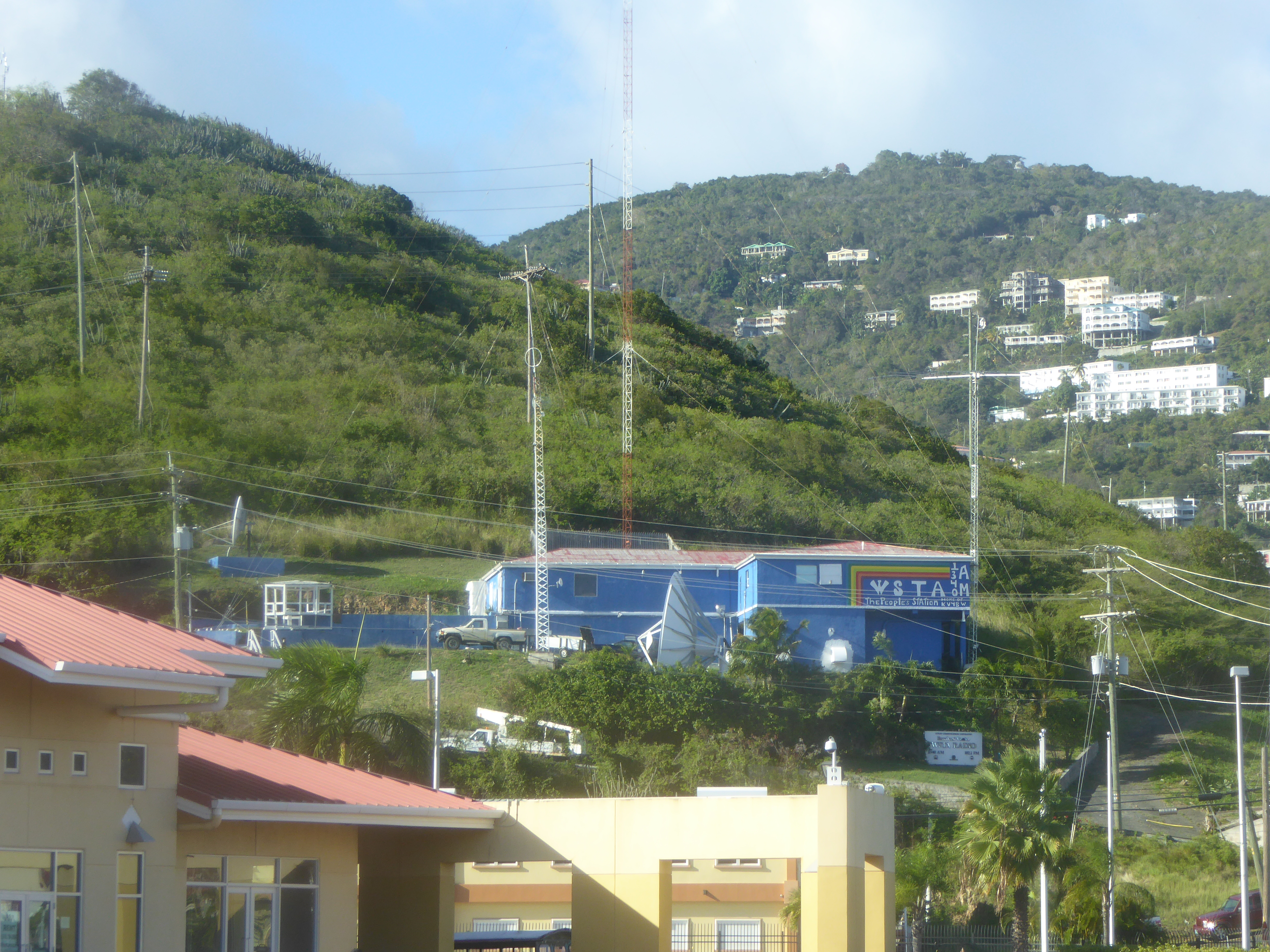
WSTA's studios and transmitter facility, pictured in 2015

In 1958, Greer sold WSTA to Island Broadcasting Company, Inc.; Island also owned KUAM in Guam. Len Stein, one of KUAM's employees, moved to St. Thomas to run the newly purchased Virgin Islands station. In the aftermath of the Island sale, WSTA was sold to William M. O'Neil in 1960. O'Neil applied for an increase in power to 1,000 watts in 1961; the station was permitted to relocate its transmitter in 1975, when the studios were moved from the Frenchtown area to their present site, but a power increase was denied on account of potential interference to a co-channel station in the Dominican Republic.

After 24 years, O'Neil sold WSTA for $450,000 to Ottley Communications Corporation in 1984; the lead owner was Athniel C. "Addie" Ottley. Ottley had already been associated with the station; he was its manager in 1970. Also in 1984, the station went to 1,000 watts, and Addie Ottley took over the morning shift. He remained heavily active with the station until his last show on January 28, 2022, less than two weeks before his death; his last shows were done from his daughter's house in Indiana, where he was recovering from a fall. Under Ottley's stewardship, the station remained on the air while hurricanes Hugo and Irma lashed the Virgin Islands; it was out of service for less than 24 hours at the height of Hurricane Marilyn in 1995. After Hugo, the station's transmissions provided a vital source of information, as telephone lines were inoperable and WBNB-TV, the television station on St. Thomas, was permanently put out of commission by the storm. After Marilyn, the station began airing regular "good news" segments.

WSTA also previously operated on FM as WSTA-FM 102.7 in the 1980s and 1990s. Due to more than a year of silence, the FM station's license was automatically canceled by the FCC in 1998. Dianne Quander worked at WSTA-FM as well as at radio stations in Washington, D.C.
