= Rosie (band) =

American pop group

- Genres: Blue-eyed soul, pop
- Labels: RCA
- Past members: David Lasley; Lana Marrano; Lynn Pitney

Rosie was an American pop group from New York, United States. The group existed from 1975 to 1978 and consisted of David Lasley, Lana Marrano (née Susan Joan Gaynes) and Lynn Pitney, all of whom were cast members and met during the touring show of Hair. Lasley wrote all the songs, mostly with Marrano.

In 1975, Rosie performed as back-up singers for Genya Ravan at her Reno Sweeney show, where they also performed one of their own songs. Ravan brought the group to Mike Berniker at RCA where they put on a live performance of their songs.

I was floored by it...this was blue-eyed soul. I wanted to produce them so bad it hurt. I got on the phone to Mike Berniker and raved about how good Rosie was...we set up a meeting...I called for David, Lynn, Lana and their pianist to come, and they pitched straight into a live performance

— Genya Ravan, Lollipop Lounge

== Better Late Than Never ==
Rosie released two albums on RCA. Better Late Than Never was produced by Genya Ravan and Harvey Goldberg, released in 1976 with "Roll Me Through the Rushes" issued as the first single. The song was arranged by Charles Calello.

== Last Dance ==
Last Dance was produced by Michael Kamen and released in 1977. "The Words Don't Matter" was issued as the first single. The album was released on the same day that Elvis Presley died, which shifted RCA's promotion attention away from Last Dance. The song "Out of Pawn" was covered by Tim Curry.
