= It's the Falling in Love =

Song by Michael Jackson featuring Patti Austin

from the album Off the Wall
- Released: August 10, 1979
- Recorded: December 1978
- Genre: Soul; city pop
- Length: 3:48
- Label: Epic; CBS
- Songwriters: Carole Bayer Sager; David Foster
- Producer: Quincy Jones

Licensed audio
- "It's the Falling in Love" on YouTube

"It's the Falling in Love" is a song by American recording artist Michael Jackson with guest vocals by R&B singer–songwriter Patti Austin. It is the ninth track from his fifth studio album, Off the Wall (1979). It was written by Carole Bayer Sager and David Foster, with production by Quincy Jones.

Bayer Sager first recorded the song for her album ...Too in 1978, featuring background vocals by Michael McDonald and Bill Champlin.

The version of the song by Dee Dee Bridgewater is included on her 1979 album Bad for Me. Bee Gees protégé Samantha Sang also released a version of this song in 1979, which is now available only in Australia on her album The Ultimate Collection. Dionne Warwick also recorded the song for her 1980 album No Night So Long.

== Personnel ==
Personnel as listed in the album's liner notes are:

- Patti Austin – lead vocals, background vocals
- Tom Bahler – vocal arrangement
- David Foster – synthesizer, rhythm arrangement
- Gary Grant – trumpet
- Marlo Henderson – guitar
- Jerry Hey – horn arrangements, trumpet, flugelhorn
- Kim Hutchcroft – baritone saxophone, tenor saxophone, flute
- Michael Jackson – lead vocals, background vocals
- Louis Johnson – bass guitar
- Quincy Jones – producer, rhythm arrangements, vocal arrangements
- Greg Phillinganes – piano, Fender Rhodes
- Steve Porcaro – synthesizer, programming
- Bill Reichenbach Jr. – trombone
- John Robinson – drums
- The Seawind Horns – horns
- Bruce Swedien – recording engineer, audio mixer
- Wah Wah Watson – guitar
- Larry Williams – tenor saxophone, alto saxophone, flute
