= Same Ole Love (365 Days a Year) =

Single by Anita Baker

from the album Rapture
- B-side: "Sweet Love"; "You Bring Me Joy"
- Released: February 1987
- Recorded: 1985
- Studio: Baker's Keyboard Lounge (Detroit, MI)
- Genre: R&B; soul
- Length: 4:05
- Label: Elektra
- Songwriters: Darryl K. Roberts; Marilyn McLeod
- Producer: Michael J. Powell

Anita Baker singles chronology
"Caught Up in the Rapture" (1986)	"Same Ole Love (365 Days a Year)" (1987)	"No One in the World" (1987)

"Same Ole Love (365 Days a Year)" is a song by American R&B artist Anita Baker. The song was released as a single to support her multi-platinum album, Rapture.

== Music video ==
The music video was directed by Michael Bay, and was filmed in early 1987 in various locations throughout Detroit, Michigan, including the Keyboard Lounge and Tiger Stadium.

== Chart performance ==
"Same Ole Love" peaked at #8 on Billboard's Hot Black Singles and #6 on Billboard's Adult Contemporary Singles. It also peaked at #44 on the Billboard Hot 100 charts in 1987.

== Charts ==
Chart (1987)	Peak position
UK Singles (The Official Charts Company)	100
US Billboard Hot 100	44
US Hot R&B/Hip-Hop Songs	8
US Adult Contemporary Tracks	6
