= If I Had My Wish Tonight =

- Japanese release picture sleeve

Single by David Lasley

from the album Missin' Twenty Grand
- B-side: "There's Got to Be Somebody (Back on the Street Again)"
- Released: March 1982
- Genre: Pop
- Length: 3:33
- Label: EMI America
- Songwriter(s): Randy Goodrum; Dave Loggins
- Producer(s): David Lasley

David Lasley singles chronology
"One Fine Day" (1973)	"If I Had My Wish Tonight" (1982)	"Teamwork" (1984)

Music video
- "If I Had My Wish Tonight" on YouTube

"If I Had My Wish Tonight" is a song written by Randy Goodrum and Dave Loggins originally released in 1979 by Dave Loggins on his self-titled album. American singer-songwriter David Lasley covered the song for his album Missin' Twenty Grand, releasing it as its first single. The song debuted on March 13, 1982, and reached a peak position of 36 on the Billboard Hot 100 on May 1, 1982.

The song was produced by Lasley with strings arranged by Arif Mardin. Dave Iveland is credited as co-producer and recording engineer. Bonnie Raitt contributed background vocals. It appears on Lasley's Back To Blue-Eyed Soul Collected Works released in 2001 and on EMI compilations Lost Hits of the 80s Vol. 2 and AOL Light Mellow: EMI Edition.

== Composition, lyrics and style ==
Don Shewey for the Boston Phoenix described the performance and delivery of the lyrics "while the singer wails, a sort of Greek chorus led by Bonnie Raitt emblazons the wish on the back of the departing lover: "'Stead of walkin' away/You'd want me to stay/You would want me" (note the insistence of those "w" sounds)."

== Credits and personnel ==
- Bonnie Raitt – backing vocals
- Chuck Cochran – backing vocals, guitar
- David Lasley – lead and backing vocals, producer
- Wade Short – bass
- David Benoit – conductor, electric piano, organ
- Jody Linscott – congas
- Willie Wilcox – drums
- Marty Walsh – guitar
- David Garibaldi – percussion
- Bill Schnee – engineer, mixing
- Benny Facone – engineer
- Paul McKenna – engineer, assistant
- Dave Iveland – producer, recording
- Derek DuNann – recording
- David Loggins – songwriter
- Randy Goodrum – songwriter
- Arif Mardin – string arrangement

== Critical reception ==
Don Shewey for the Boston Phoenix praised the song writing "the sumptuous semi-hit" calling Lasley's falsetto "so passionate that the second verse trails off midway (perhaps to allow the singer to break down a la James Brown)" declaring it "a mini-masterpiece, milked for every drop by Arif Mardin's superb string arrangement."
