= The 20 Grand =

Nightclub in Detroit, Michigan

- Address: Detroit, Michigan; United States
- Type: Nightclub

Construction
- Opened: 1953; 73 years ago

The 20 Grand was one of Detroit's most famous night clubs. It was located at the intersection of 14th Street and Warren Avenue, at 5020 14th St. It opened by Bill Kabbus and Marty Eisner in 1953. The original facility was destroyed by fire in 1958, at which point it was rebuilt into a renowned multiplex facility showcasing Black entertainment. The site was later demolished, and is presently a grass lot.

The 20 Grand was a place where people could go to dance, and see live performances on Thursday, Friday and Saturday. There was also a club night for youths.

On the first floor of The 20 Grand there was a bowling alley and a fireside lounge that was used as a jazz room. On the upper floor there was a room called the Gold Room, which consist of a large banquet and a cabaret hall which could seat up to 1,200 people.

There was a studio inside The 20 Grand built for Ernie Durham, a famous Detroit radio personality. There was also the Driftwood Lounge which was located next to the Golden Room, which was where most of the performances and shows took place. The Supremes, Chuck Jackson, Parliament-Funkadelic, Florence Ballard, The Utopias, and Stevie Wonder performed there. Mick Jagger first saw B.B King perform here in 1964.

There was a motel located next door where couples would check in after a long night out at the club. The name of the motel was Twenty Grand Motel but it was not owned by the owner of The 20 Grand; it was owned by a man named Ed Wingate.

== In Pop Culture ==
David Lasley's Missin' Twenty Grand album was named after The 20 Grand.

== See also ==
- McDougal, Weldon. The 20 Grand Story. [Online]Available http://www.soulfuldetroit.com/forum/index.html
- McMurray, Clay. The 20 Grand Story. [Online]Available http://www.soulfuldetroit.com/forum/index.html
- Meikle, David. The 20 Grand Story. [Online]Available http://www.soulfuldetroit.com/forum/index.html
- Street, Cal. The 20 Grand Story. [Online]Available http://www.soulfuldetroit.com/forum/index.html
- Mick Jagger's comments at 2012 "Red, White and Blues" pbs white house performance
