= No One in the World =

1987 single by Anita Baker

Single by Anita Baker

from the album Rapture
- B-side: "Watch Your Step"
- Released: July 1987
- Recorded: 1985
- Genre: R&B; soul
- Length: 4:10
- Label: Elektra
- Songwriter(s): Marti Sharron, Ken Hirsch
- Producer(s): Marti Sharron, Gary Skardina

Anita Baker singles chronology
"Same Ole Love (365 Days a Year)" (1987)	"No One in the World" (1987)	""Ain't No Need to Worry" (with The Winans)" (1987)

"No One in the World" is a song by American R&B singer Anita Baker. It was the fourth single from her multi-platinum album, Rapture. It had previously been released by Dionne Warwick on her 1985 album Finder of Lost Loves and again on her 1987 album Reservations for Two.

== Chart performance ==
"No One in the World" peaked at number five on the Billboard Hot Black Singles chart, and #9 on the Billboard Adult Contemporary Singles. The single peaked at number #44, missing Billboard's top 40 Hot 100 chart.

== In popular culture ==
The song was featured in an early 1988 episode of the US daytime soap opera All My Children as well as 1988 episodes of Santa Barbara and The Young and The Restless and a 1989 episode of Another World.

== Personnel ==
- Drums, Percussion: John Robinson
- Bass: Neil Stubenhaus
- Guitars: Paul Jackson Jr., Dean Parks
- Synthesizers, Keyboards, Piano: Paul Chiten, Greg Phillinganes
- Arrangements by Sir Gant

== Charts ==
=== Weekly charts ===
Chart (1987)	Peak position
US Billboard Hot 100	44
US Adult Contemporary (Billboard)	9
US Hot R&B/Hip-Hop Songs (Billboard)	5

=== Year-end charts ===
Chart (1987)	Position
US Adult Contemporary (Billboard)	49
