= Garry Glenn =

American singer-songwriter

- Born: Garry Dewayne Glenn; May 12, 1955
- Origin: Detroit, Michigan, United States
- Died: September 27, 1991 (aged 36) Los Angeles County, California, United States
- Genres: R&B; Soul; Gospel; Jazz
- Occupation: Singer-songwriter
- Instrument(s): Piano; Vocals
- Years active: 1970s–1991
- Labels: PPL, Motown

Garry Glenn (May 12, 1955 – September 27, 1991) was an American singer, songwriter and musician best known for his association with his songwriting partner Dianne Quander and wrote the 1986 hit song "Caught Up in the Rapture" recorded by Anita Baker. He also wrote "Intimate Friends" that was recorded by Eddie Kendricks and later sampled by Alicia Keys for the Grammy Award-nominated recording "Unbreakable."

== Biography ==
Garry Dewayne Glenn was born on May 12, 1955, in Detroit, the son of Robert and Bonnie (née Beard) Glenn. As a teenager, he toured with his sister, Gospel singer, Beverly Glenn. By the late 1970s, he turned his attention to songwriting. In the 1980s he was a frequent songwriting collaborator with Dianne Quander. His songs have been recorded by The Dramatics, Earth, Wind & Fire, The Emotions, Eddie Kendricks, Jean Carne and Anita Baker.

== Selected songwriting credits ==
Song	Co-Writer(s)	Performer(s)
"Armed and Dangerous"	Martin Page and Maurice White	Atlantic Starr
"Be Careful (How You Treat My Love)"	None	Phyllis Hyman
"Caught Up In The Rapture"	Dianne Quander	Anita Baker
"Cause I Love You"	David Pruitt	The Emotions
"Da Tu Amor"	Carlos Santana and Andy Vargas	Santana
"Do You Have To Go"	None	Garry Glenn
"Feels Good To Feel Good"	Dianne Quander	Garry Glenn
"Flame of Love"	Dianne Quander	Jean Carne
"Gonna Make You Mine"	None	Natalie Cole
"Heaven In Your Arms"	Dianne Quander	R. J.'s Latest Arrival
"I Can't Let You Go"	Dianne Quander	Freddie Jackson
"Intimate Friends"	None	Eddie Kendricks, Alicia Keys (sampled on track "Unbreakable" below), Sweet Sable (sampled on track "Old Time's Sake" below)
"Lost Inside Of You"	None	Al Hudson and the Soul Partners
"Love Of My Life"	Dianne Quander	Pieces of a Dream
"No Sweeter Love"	None	Geoff McBride
"Old Time's Sake"	Tabitha Brace, Nicole Miller and Angelica Strong	Sweet Sable
"Priceless"	None	Anita Baker
"Share Your Love"	Maurice White	Earth, Wind & Fire
"Song In My Heart"	Brenda Russell and Maurice White	Earth, Wind & Fire
"Time To Move On"	R. Kelly	Sparkle
"Unbreakable"	Alicia Keys, Kanye West and Harold Lilly	Alicia Keys
"Why Not Be Mine For Awhile"	None	Five Special
"Winning Streak"	None	Pieces of a Dream

=== Recording artist ===
In 1980, Glenn recorded his eponymous album for PPL Records. Later, he joined the Motown roster, which released his second and final album, Feels Good To Feel Good in 1987, which was moderately successful. On the latter album, he wrote or co-wrote all of the songs (including four with Dianne Quander).

== Death ==
Glenn died on September 27, 1991, from kidney failure.

== Legacy ==
His songs continued to be recorded by other artists and sampled by others. His song, "Intimate Friends" (as recorded by Eddie Kendricks) was sampled on the track, "Old Time's Sake" by Sweet Sable, which appeared on the 1994 soundtrack for Above the Rim. In 2005, Alicia Keys sampled the same song on "Unbreakable". The latter recording was nominated for two Grammys and won two NAACP Image Awards. Sparkle sampled the song on the track, "Time to Move On" on her 1998 debut album.

== Notes ==
Both AllMusic and Soulwalking websites list Glenn's date of the death as September 18, 1991. The date from the California Death Index is used instead.
