= You're Moving Out Today =

Song written by Carole Bayer Sager

"You're Movin' Out Today"

Single by Bette Midler

from the album Live at Last
- B-side: "Let Me Just Follow Behind"
- Released: April 1977 (U.S.)
- Genre: Pop
- Length: 3:00
- Label: Atlantic
- Songwriters: Carole Bayer Sager, Bette Midler and Bruce Roberts
- Producer: Tom Dowd

Bette Midler singles chronology
"Old Cape Cod" (1976)	"You're Movin' Out Today" (1977)	"Storybook Children (Daybreak)" (1977)

"You're Moving Out Today"

Single by Carole Bayer Sager

from the album Carole Bayer Sager
- B-side: "Aces"
- Released: December 1976
- Genre: Pop
- Length: 3:32
- Label: Elektra
- Songwriters: Carole Bayer Sager; Bette Midler; Bruce Roberts
- Producer: Brooks Arthur

Carole Bayer Sager singles chronology
"You're Moving Out Today" (1976)	"Stronger Than Before" (1981)

"You're Moving Out Today" is a song written by Carole Bayer Sager, Bette Midler and Bruce Roberts. It became an international hit in 1977, in two versions.

Both Sager and Midler recorded the song. The first U.S. release was by Bette Midler, in February 1977. It was the lead single from her LP Live at Last. Her version reached No. 42 on the Billboard Hot 100, and also charted in Canada. On the Adult Contemporary charts, the song reached No. 11 in the U.S. and No. 9 in Canada.

== Carole Bayer Sager version ==
"You're Moving Out Today" became an international hit for Carole Bayer Sager during the fall of the year, reaching number six in the UK and spending four weeks at number one in Australia.

Although Sager is a prolific songwriter who is credited on many hit singles, this was the first one that she performed herself.

== Chart history ==
=== Weekly charts ===
Weekly chart performance for Bette Midler's version of "You're Moving Out Today"
Chart (1977)	Peak position
Canada Top Singles (RPM)	67
Canada Adult Contemporary (RPM)	9
US Billboard Hot 100	42
US Adult Contemporary (Billboard)	11
US Cash Box Top 100	78

Weekly chart performance for Carole Bayer Sager's version of "You're Moving Out Today"
Chart (1977)	Peak position
Australia (Kent Music Report)	1
Canada Top Singles (RPM)	49
New Zealand (Recorded Music NZ)	30
UK Singles (Official Charts)	6
US Cash Box Top 100	57

=== Year-end charts ===
Year-end chart performance for Carole Bayer Sager's version of "You're Moving Out Today"
Chart (1977)	Position
Australia (Kent Music Report)	9
