= Dianne Quander =

American songwriter

Dianne Quander is an American songwriter, best known for writing the song "Caught Up In The Rapture," with her writing partner Garry Glenn which was recorded by Anita Baker. She also collaborated on songs of various artists including "Take You To Heaven" by Earth, Wind and Fire, "Why Not Me" by Phyllis Hyman, "Flame of Love" by Jean Carne and "Sweet Control" by Jon Lucien.

== Biography ==
Dianne Quander is a native of Washington, D.C. She graduated from Howard University with a BA degree in Journalism and Television and Film. She worked at Radio Station WHUR-FM in DC as a news reporter and then as an on-air personality (DJ). After WHUR, she moved to St. Thomas in the U.S. Virgin Islands, where she worked at WSTA playing a mix of R&B, jazz, pop and rock music. After a year in St. Thomas, Dianne moved back to Washington, D.C. and worked at the Pacific radio station WPFW, playing music on the late night to early morning shift. She soon moved to Los Angeles to pursue a writing career as a lyricist. Dianne met her musical soul mate Garry Glenn and they signed a publishing deal with Warner Brothers Music/Warner Chappell and collaborated on songs for several artists. Dianne and Garry both branched out on their own and she collaborated with writer-producers such as Maurice White, George Duke, Hiroshima, David Cochran, Jermaine Jackson, John Barnes, Jeff Lorber and Stephanie Spruill and more. Dianne was with Warner Chappell for 8 years.

Selected songwriting credits: "Cross Your Mind" (George Howard), "Steppin into the Night" (movie Armed and Dangerous), "Stay with Love" (The Jackson's mini-series), "Mind Blowin'" (The Whispers), "Just Another Lonely Night" (Johnny Gill), "Crazy Bout Your Lovin'" (Robert Brookins), "Finding My Way Back to You" (Chante Moore).

Song	Co-Writer(s)	Performer(s)
"Caught Up In The Rapture"	Garry Glenn	Anita Baker
"Cross Your Mind"	David Cochrane	Evelyn Champagne King, George Howard
"Feels Good To Feel Good"	Garry Glenn	Garry Glenn
"Flame of Love"	Garry Glenn	Jean Carne
"Heaven In Your Arms"	Garry Glenn	R. J.'s Latest Arrival
"I Can't Let You Go"	Garry Glenn	Freddie Jackson
"Love Of My Life"	Garry Glenn	Pieces of a Dream
"Sweet Control"	Jeff Lorber and Stephanie Spruill	Jon Lucien
