= Lullaby of Broadway (song) =

1935 song by Harry Warren and Al Dubin

Song
- Published: 1935 by M. Witmark & Sons
- Composer: Harry Warren
- Lyricist: Al Dubin

"Lullaby of Broadway" is a popular song with music written by Harry Warren and lyrics by Al Dubin, published in 1935. The lyrics salute the nightlife of Broadway and its denizens, who "don't sleep tight until the dawn."

The song was introduced by Wini Shaw in the musical film Gold Diggers of 1935, and, in an unusual move, it was used as background music in a sequence in the Bette Davis film Special Agent that same year. Furthermore, again that year, it was sung by Jeane Cowan in a night club scene in the James Cagney film G Men. In three Warner Bros. films, it won the 1935 Academy Award for Best Original Song.

== Lyrics ==
Unlike the song "Manhattan" and many others, "Lullaby of Broadway" does not name-check any Broadway locations. The line, "The daffydils who entertain / At Angelo's and Maxie's" references a fictitious place (or places). "Daffydils" — often sung as "daffodils" — was a slang term for chorus girls (or indeed boys, depending on the venue). Since the song was written, several real establishments have opened on or around Broadway, adopting the name from the song, rather than vice versa.

== Popular recordings ==
Hit versions in 1935 were by:

- Richard Himber and His Ritz-Carlton Orchestra (vocal by Joey Nash) recorded 11 February 1935 (RCA Victor 24868 - A)
- The Dorsey Brothers Orchestra (vocal by Bob Crosby)
- Little Jack Little
- Reginald Foresythe
- Hal Kemp (vocal: Bob Allen)
- Chick Bullock

Other versions have been recorded by:

- 1944 The Andrews Sisters - recorded August 24, 1944 for Decca Records.
- 1951 Doris Day recorded the song twice in 1950. The first was with the Norman Luboff Choir and the Buddy Cole Quartet on December 8. This was included in the album Lullaby of Broadway. The second was on December 28, 1950 with Harry James and his orchestra. (Doris Day discography).
- 1956 Bing Crosby recorded the song for use on his radio show and it was subsequently included in the box set The Bing Crosby CBS Radio Recordings (1954-56) issued by Mosaic Records (catalog MD7-245) in 2009.
- 1957 Tony Bennett for his album The Beat of My Heart.
- 1959 Ella Fitzgerald recorded the song on her Verve release Ella Fitzgerald Sings Sweet Songs for Swingers, accompanied by the Frank DeVol Orchestra.
- 1962 The song was recorded by Connie Francis in 1962 and 1963 and a version can be found on her album Connie Francis Sings Award Winning Motion Picture Hits (1963).
- 1964 Caterina Valente - included on her album I Happen to Like New York.
- 1973 Bette Midler recorded a cover of the song for her album Bette Midler. The song is performed as a medley with "Optimistic Voices". It also appears on her 1977 album Live at Last.
- 1977 The Pasadena Roof Orchestra included on their album The Show Must Go On.
- 1979 Bram Tchaikovsky as a single.
- 2003 Dianne Reeves recorded it on her album, A Little Moonlight.
- 2004 Chelsea Krombach covered this song on her debut album Profile.
- 2006 Tony Bennett and the Dixie Chicks as a track for his album Duets: An American Classic.
- 2016 Swing revivalists the Cherry Poppin' Daddies recorded a version for their album The Boop-A-Doo, a cover album of 1920s and 1930s jazz standards, taking its title from a lyric from the song.

== Film appearances ==
- 1935 Gold Diggers of 1935,
- 1935 Special Agent
- 1935 G Men
- 1935 Page Miss Glory (Merrie Melodies cartoon), based on a Dubin-Warren song, the Dorsey Brothers Orchestra version served as part of the background music.
- 1951 Lullaby of Broadway, sung by Doris Day.
- 1980 Taxi (TV series), season 2, episode 24 "Fantasy Borough: Part 2" .
- 1993 Life with Mikey

== In popular culture ==
It is also featured in an episode of Taxi (performed by Marilu Henner) and the Broadway musical 42nd Street, originated by Jerry Orbach playing Julian Marsh in the 1980 original cast.

In 1976, Wini Shaw's original recorded version of the song was released as a 45 rpm single and made no. 42 in the UK charts. Subsequently, the BBC interviewed Wini Shaw O'Malley in New York about her new success with it. She could not believe it.

The song was used in a commercial for the Milford Plaza Hotel, where it was called the "Lullabuy of Broadway".

The song was performed by a group of Muppet eskimos in the Gilda Radner episode of The Muppet Show.

In Lisa Stansfield's 1990 music video for her cover of Cole Porter's "Down in the Depths (On the Ninetieth Floor)", the beginning and ending are both references to the song. The video begins with her disembodied head zooming in, while singing the opening to the song, and ends with it zooming out, while singing the outro.

Linda Lavin and Martha Raye sang this song in the 1970s TV show Alice in the episode "Sharples vs. Sharples".

In 2005, Idina Menzel recorded a pop/hip-hop version of the song for the end credits of ShowBusiness: The Road to Broadway.

The song appears in the dancing video game Dance on Broadway.
