= You Bring Me Joy (Anita Baker song) =

Song by Anita Baker

from the album Rapture
- Released: 1986
- Genre: R&B; soul
- Length: 4:24
- Label: Elektra
- Songwriter: David Lasley
- Producer: Michael J. Powell

Music video
- "You Bring Me Joy" on YouTube

"You Bring Me Joy" is a song written by David Lasley originally recorded in 1980 by Norman Connors featuring the vocals of Adaritha for Connors' Take It to the Limit album. It was released as a B-side single in 1980 on Arista Records. American R&B singer and songwriter Anita Baker covered the song for her second studio album, Rapture (1986), produced by Michael J. Powell.

In 1990, Lasley released the song on his Soldiers on the Moon album, a live studio recording with David Benoit on piano, Jeff Porcaro on drums and Abraham Laboriel on bass, and produced by Jeffrey Weber. Jonathan Widran of AllMusic described "This collection sports...sensuous originals including "You Bring Me Joy" from Anita Baker..."

Yolanda Adams gave a tribute performance of "You Bring Me Joy" to Anita Baker at the 2018 BET Awards honoring Baker with the Lifetime Achievement Award.

== Critical reception ==
The song received notable critical praise and mention in numerous record reviews and reviews of Anita Baker's live performances.

Stephen Holden of The New York Times wrote "In the verses of David Lasley's beautiful pop-gospel ballad 'You Bring Me Joy,' Miss Baker's voice looped from phrase to phrase in the manner of Sarah Vaughan. Then, for the song's climactic declarations, she became a pure gospel singer, testifying with a stirring fervor and directness."

Jeff Tamarkin of Billboard describes Baker's performance of "the devastating David Lasley-written 'You Bring Me Joy' to kick the show into high gear and create the charged mood that was sustained throughout."

Of the Sunday night Irvine Meadows show of singer Anita Baker, Steve Eddy wrote of the songs "The most notable Sunday evening was "You Bring Me Joy" a David Lasley tune that has a pleasing Gospel tinge."

Lenny Kravitz, in his book Let Love Rule called "You Bring Me Joy" by Anita Baker "one of the sweetest R&B ballads."
