= Harlettes =

Trio of backup singers who support Bette Midler

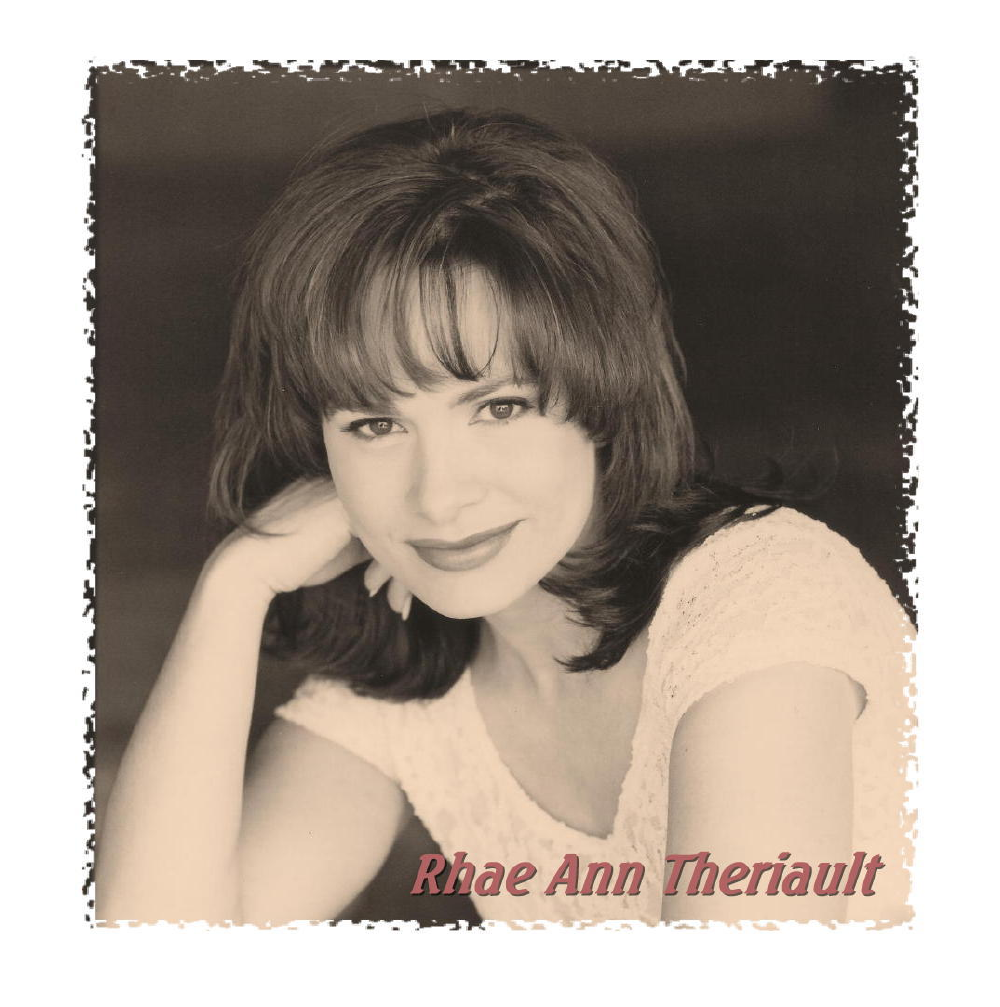

The Harlettes, also known as The Staggering Harlettes, is a trio of backup singers who support Bette Midler during her live musical performances. The Harlettes' line-up has changed many times since their inception.

== History ==
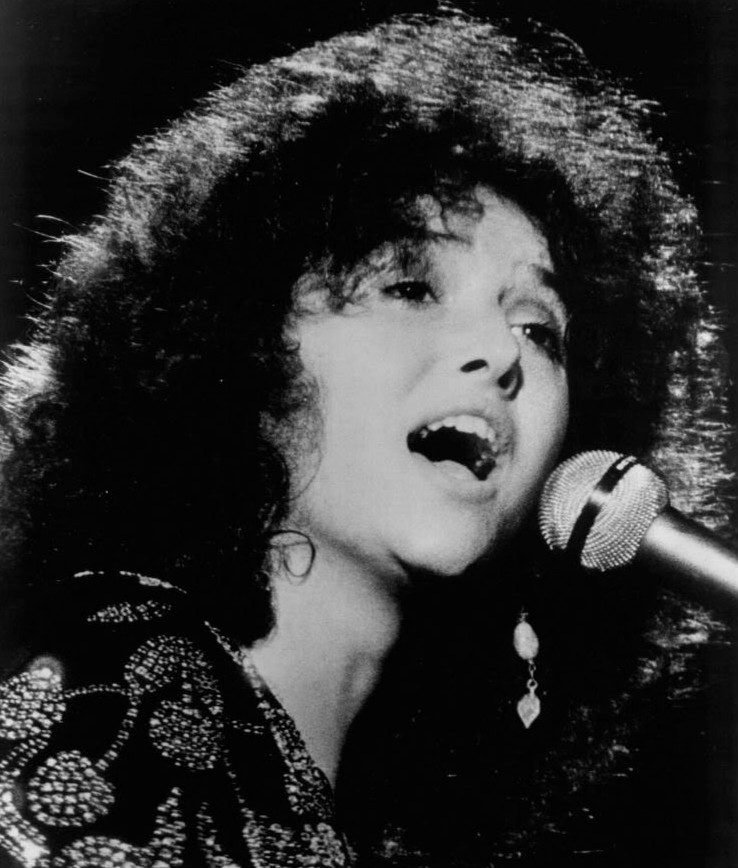
Melissa Manchester, one of the original Harlettes

Bette Midler's stage act grew out of her early 1970s performances at the Continental Baths, a gay bathhouse in Manhattan which offered entertainment on the weekends. With her powerful singing voice, outrageous costumes and biting wit, Midler became a favorite of the bathhouse crowd.

Inspired in part by the Theatre of the Ridiculous, Midler's stage show evolved into a bawdy and flamboyant mixture of stand-up comedy, vaudeville and burlesque. It was during this time that Midler cultivated her stage persona as "The Divine Miss M". "The more outrageous I was, the more they liked it," Midler said. "It loosened me up."

With the assistance of Barry Manilow — at the time working as a pianist at the Continental Baths — Midler enlisted her first trio of backup singers, including Melissa Manchester. Originally they were called The Red Light District, then M.G.M. (the initials of the original members: Melissa, Gail and Merle), but eventually they were called The Harlettes.

With backing vocals by the Harlettes and choreography by Toni Basil, Midler's performances became known for their exhausting singing and dance routines. In a 1973 Rolling Stone review of one of her shows, writer Ed McCormack stated: "Watching Bette and the girls work out, the raw awkward sexual energy of it all makes you think of Tina Turner." During a single performance, Midler and the Harlettes would sing everything from midcentury radio tunes and standards such as "Boogie Woogie Bugle Boy", "Big Noise From Winnetka", "I Only Have Eyes for You" and "Lullaby of Broadway", to early girl group pop songs such as "Leader of the Pack", "Chapel of Love", and "Da Doo Ron Ron", all while changing in and out of costumes as varied as pink waitress uniforms, sequined gowns and mermaid tails.

Former Harlette Linda Hart was quoted in Playbill in 2008 as saying that working as a Harlette was "like show business boot camp" and that she learned much from the experience. Midler referred in 2007 to her relationship with the Harlettes in this way: "We have a great relationship. They adore me and I pay them."

== Special appearances ==
- Original Harlettes Melissa Manchester, Gail Kantor and Merle Miller joined Barry Manilow on his 1974 tour following the release of his breakthrough album, Barry Manilow II.
- Members Charlotte Crossley, Sharon Redd and Ula Hedwig appear among the cast and special guests in the "album-cover" finale of the 1978 musical movie Sgt. Pepper's Lonely Hearts Club Band.
- In the 1980 concert film Divine Madness, the Harlettes are Jocelyn Brown, Diva Gray and Ula Hedwig.

== Formerly of the Harlettes ==
- In 1977, three former Harlettes released an LP titled Sharon Redd, Ula Hedwig, Charlotte Crossley - Formerly of the Harlettes with Columbia Records. This was the group's only album.

== Members ==
Group members are shown in chronological order by date of first appearance.

- Melissa Manchester (1971–1972), actress and singer/songwriter
- Merle Miller (1971–1972, 1977)
- Gail Kantor (1971–1972)
- Robin Grean (1972–1975), singer, actress and daughter of producer and composer Charles Randolph Grean
- Sharon Redd (1972–1978), singer
- Charlotte Crossley (1972–1978)
- Ula Hedwig (1975–1978, 1980, 1982–1983)
- Franny Eisenberg (1978–1980)
- Linda Hart (1978–1980, 1982–1983), actress and singer
- Katey Sagal (1978, 1982–1983), singer, songwriter and actress
- Paulette McWilliams (1979–1980), the original lead singer of Rufus
- Diva Gray (1980)
- Jocelyn Brown (1979–1980), singer
- Joanne Harris (1983)
- Jenifer Lewis (1983–1984), actress and singer
- Siobhan O'Carroll (1983)
- Helena Springs (1983)
- Carol Hatchett (1993–2000, 2015)
- Melanie Taylor (1993–2000), former member of the '80s dance duo Bardeux
- Rhae Ann Theriault (1993–2001)
- Nicolette Hart (2003–2005, 2015)
- Kyra Da Costa (2003–2009, 2015)
- Kamilah (Martin) Marshall (2003–2009)
- Aléna Watters (2007–2008)
- Jordan Ballard (2007–2009)
