= David Lasley =

American singer, songwriter, and actor (1947–2021)

Background information
- Born: David Eldon Lasley; August 20, 1947; Sault Ste. Marie, Michigan, U.S.
- Died: December 9, 2021 (aged 74)
- Genres: Pop; R&B; soul; pop rock; rock; jazz; blues rock; folk rock; folk; Americana
- Occupations: Singer; songwriter; musician; actor
- Labels: RCA; EMI; Pony Canyon

David Eldon Lasley (August 20, 1947 – December 9, 2021) was an American recording artist, singer, musician and songwriter. He was best known as a touring background singer for James Taylor, as a session singer on recordings by artists including Taylor, Bonnie Raitt, Luther Vandross, Chic, Aretha Franklin, Dionne Warwick, Bette Midler, Cher, Dusty Springfield and Boz Scaggs; as a songwriter for artists including Bonnie Raitt, Whitney Houston, Anita Baker, Maxine Nightingale, Rita Coolidge, Crystal Gayle, and Luther Vandross; and for his solo albums, albums with his 1970s vocal group Rosie, and for his early years in Detroit with his vocal group The Utopias.

In 1980, David Lasley was signed by David Geffen to Geffen Records. At the time he was one of the chief staff writers at Irving Almo Music.

In The Advocate, 1985 Adam Block described Lasley as "one of the most heard, least known, figures in pop", with a "velvet falsetto" and "songwriting reminiscent of early Laura Nyro". Stephen Holden described Lasley as "the somewhat more refined white soul singer" in a comparison with the high tenor of Mick Hucknall of Simply Red.

Lasley appears in the cast of 20 Feet from Stardom.

== Early life and education ==
Lasley was born in Michigan, the son of Bernice and Roy Lasley. He grew up in Branch, Michigan on a farm north of Grand Rapids. He is the younger brother of Dean and Judy and had a younger sister, Julie Ann, a singer with his group The Utopias. Mabel McKenzie, his maternal grandmother, was the Custer Representative of The News.

Lasley sang with his family in church. He participated in the school band playing cornet with Dan Shoup, the band president, including the annual concert crowning the Band Queen in the Mason County Eastern school gymnasium.

== Career ==
=== The Utopias, Detroit, Fortune Records ===
In his teens, Lasley put together an a cappella singing group called The Utopias with his sister Julie and Joan Hughes. Lasley went to Detroit with his group to play the records they made themselves for local radio stations and to record labels looking for a deal. As reported by Roger Bass in Billboard, The Utopias released their first recording, "Girls Are Against Me" on the LaSalle label, distributed by Solid Hitbounds Productions.

The Utopias were signed by Fortune Records releasing songs written by Lasley, including "Good Friends Forever" and "Sally Bad". Music critic Dave Marsh, who referred Lasley to Fortune Records, says he was "compelled to mention Detroit roots".

The Utopias' first manager, John Bosquely, booked frequent club dates for the group, whose appearances included the Webb Wood, gigs for the radio DJ Johnny Weems, Swingin' Time TV Show hosted by Robin Seymour, and the Driftwood Lounge at The 20 Grand nightclub, which they played forty Sunday nights in a row. Included in The Utopia's repertoire was Lasley's vocal performance of the Aretha Franklin song "Respect". At the Twenty Grand, Lasley befriended Roger Bass, keyboard player of the house band, who wrote The Utopias third single "Girls Are Against Me".

Lasley met their second manager, Johnny Powers around early 1969.

His first recording as a songwriter was "Just Give Me One Good Reason" by Maxine Brown, written with Roger Bass.

Lasley's cover recording of "One Fine Day", produced by Johnny Powers and Roger Bass, was released by Philly Groove 178 (Bell) in 1973 and was a Billboard Top Single Pick.

=== Hair, Broadway ===
In 1970 he joined the cast of Hair, performing first in Detroit and then on tour. This led to a move to New York City, and performances on and off-Broadway. Lasley played a leading singing role in the 1972 Gerome Ragni-Galt MacDermot Broadway show Dude, which opened at the Broadway Theatre in 1972.

=== Work with Luther Vandross and others ===
Lasley began his career as a back-up singer in 1970. Along with Luther Vandross, he performed on many of Chic's and Sister Sledge's recordings. Darlene Love related in an interview with Hi-Fi Magazine how she met Luther Vandross through Lasley.

In Lenny Kravitz's book Let Love Rule, Kravitz describes meeting Lasley, his generosity offering him a couch to sleep on, being mentored by Lasley with invaluable songwriting advice, and an introduction to Almo/Irving Music which led to a publishing deal. Kravitz was privy to late-night phone calls between Luther Vandross and Lasley, made from Vandross's hotel room after shows.

Performers with whom Lasley worked include Todd Rundgren, Rita Coolidge, Melissa Manchester and Bonnie Raitt, who recorded a number of Lasley's compositions.

In the 1980s Lasley was the radio voice of commercials including Miller Beer and Seagram's Cooler.

=== Work with James Taylor ===
In 1977 Lasley began touring with James Taylor as a background vocalist. He also performed as background vocalist with Taylor on The Jay Leno Show, other television and film appearances, and on his recording sessions.

=== Rosie ===
As the band Rosie, with Lynn Pitney and Lana Marrano also on vocals, Lasley released the albums Better Late Than Never (RCA, 1976), which featured "Roll Me Through The Rushes", and Last Dance (RCA, 1977).

=== Solo artist recordings ===
==== Missin' Twenty Grand ====
Lasley's debut solo album Missin' Twenty Grand was named after The 20 Grand, a Detroit club where he and his sister used to sing for free. Lasley described the album: "it's a lot about my teenage years. I've often wanted to go back to Detroit".

The single "If I Had My Wish Tonight" spent 10 weeks on the Billboard Hot 100, peaking at No. 36 in May 1982.

Billboard's "First Time Around" section stated about "Missin' Twenty Grand": "Lasley, a session singer and writer, moves into the pop forefront with this collection of personal and sensitive songs. Lasley's unique falsetto vocal style works well on both pop and R&B accented tunes giving this LP broad appeal."

==== Raindance ====
Raindance is the second solo studio album by Lasley, released on EMI Records. It was produced by Don Was. "It's A Cryin' Shame (Sha La La La)" was released as a single in 1984.

==== Soldiers On The Moon ====
Soldiers On The Moon is the third solo studio album by Lasley, recorded live to 2-track and produced by Jeff Weber. It was released by Pony Canyon in Japan and Agenda, distributed by BMG, in the US. It was reissued in Japan by Cool Sounds.

===== Demos, Demos 2, Expectations of Love, Back To Blue-Eyed Soul, Now and Again =====
Billboard Reviews & Previews, wrote of his 2000 album Back to Blue-Eyed Soul: "Lasley delves through his vast catalog, breathing new life into 21 of his finest tunes. (...) Lasley neither mimics the original versions of his hits nor succumbs to the temptation to recast his material with trendy rhythms."

Glenn Hoskins and Barry Towler, Record Corner, wrote of Lasley's 2001 album Expectations of Love: "David's passionate and soaring falsetto is as good as ever and his ability to pen gorgeous songs founded in the best traditions of soul, jazz and Adult Pop has not deserted him. Lovers of quality soul / jazz vocals will be welcoming this with open arms."

== Death ==
Lasley died on December 9, 2021, at the age of 74. Notable people that posted tributes included Bonnie Raitt, James Taylor, Bette Midler, Desmond Child, Roxanne Seeman, and the ASCAP organization, among others. Taylor tweeted a YouTube video of a David Lasley song that received over 24,000 views in 24 hours, that was shared in Billboard's obituary. Raitt spoke of Lasley as a "beautiful friend and bright light in our music world, golden voiced David Lasley."

On December 10 at the James Taylor - Jackson Browne concert in Grand Rapids, Michigan, Taylor paid homage to Lasley saying "we lost a really close friend last night", pointing out that Lasley had performed with the band since the mid-1970s. "We want to remember David Lasley - a great, great singer and a great artist" and gave a gospel-inspired tribute performance of "Shower the People".

== Discography ==
=== Solo discography ===
==== Singles ====
- "One Fine Day" – (1973)
- "If I Had My Wish Tonight" – (1982)
- "Teamwork" – (1982)
- "It's A Cryin Shame (Sha La La La La)" – (1984)

==== Albums ====
- Demos – (1981)
- Missin' Twenty Grand – (1982)
- Raindance – (1984)
- Soldiers on the Moon – (1990)
- Back to Blue-Eyed Soul – Collected Works/1966-1999 (2000)
- Expectations of Love – (2001)
- Demos Volume 2 – Take a Look – (2005)
- Now And Again – (2006)

=== Selected songwriting credits ===
- "All the Things I Love" – Debra Laws on Very Special
- "Blue Side":
  - Crystal Gayle on Miss the Mississippi
  - Valerie Carter on Vanilla Grits
- "Change All of That" – Arnold McCuller on Exception to the Rule
- "Close Enough" – Dionne Warwick on Reservations for Two
- "Cold, Cold Streets" – Feargal Sharkey on Wish
- "Come What May" – Patti LaBelle on It's Alright With Me
- "Crazy Love":
  - Sheena Easton on My Cherie
  - Patti LaBelle on Burnin'
  - Luther Vandross on Your Secret Love
- "Dancin' on the Smooth Edge" – Whitney Houston on Exhale
- "Got You on My Mind" – Bonnie Raitt on Streetlights
- "I Ain't Gonna Let You Break My Heart Again":
  - Bonnie Raitt on Nick of Time
  - Tricia Tahara on Secrets
- "I Am Ready Now" – Jennifer Holliday on Feel My Soul
- "I Don't Go Shopping":
  - Peter Allen on Bi-Coastal
  - Patti LaBelle on Released
- "I Got a Groove On" – Peaches & Herb
- "I Wish That Love Would Last" – Dusty Springfield on Simply Dusty
- "Jojo" – Boz Scaggs on Middle Man
- "Lead Me On" – Maxine Nightingale on Lead Me On
- "Love Me Again":
  - Patti Austin on Body Language
  - Rita Coolidge on Love Me Again
- "Meant for You" – Debra Laws on Very Special
- "Naked Truth" – Leata Galloway on The Naked Truth
- "Nightline" – Randy Crawford on Nightline
- "Out of Pawn" – Tim Curry on Simplicity
- "Roll Me Through the Rushes" – Chaka Khan on Chaka
- "Scuse Me, While I Fall In Love" - Donna Washington
- "Somebody's Angel" – Peter Allen on Bi-Coastal
- "Talk to Me" – Kiki Dee on Stay with Me
- "There's a Star for Everyone" – Aretha Franklin on Love All the Hurt Away
- "This Christmas, This Year" – The Jets on Christmas with the Jets
- "This Time" – Chaka Khan on The Woman I Am
- "You Bring Me Joy" – Anita Baker on Rapture

=== Notable album appearances ===
- Stephen Bishop – Red Cab to Manhattan – (1980)
- Martin Briley – Dangerous Moments – (1984)
- Roy Buchanan:
  - You're Not Alone – (1978)
  - Guitar on Fire: The Atlantic Sessions — (1993)
- Jimmy Buffett – One Particular Harbour – (1983)
- Irene Cara – What a Feelin' – (1983)
- Valerie Carter:
  - Wild Child – (1978)
  - The Way It Is – (1996)
- Chic:
  - Chic – (1977)
  - C'est Chic – (1978)
  - Risqué – (1979)
- Sister Sledge – We Are Family – (1979)
- City Teacher (OST) - I Just Wanna Know U - (2007)
- Rita Coolidge – Inside the Fire – (1984)
- Randy Crawford:
  - Nightline – (1983)
  - Don't Say It's Over – (1993)
- Culture Club – From Luxury to Heartache – (1986)
- Tim Curry – Fearless – (1979)
- Kiki Dee – Stay with Me – (1979)
- Neil Diamond – In My Lifetime – (1996)
- Michael Feinstein – Nobody But You – (1998)
- Aretha Franklin – Love All the Hurt Away – (1981)
- Cissy Houston – Cissy Houston – (1977)
- Julio Iglesias – Crazy – (1994)
- Garland Jeffreys:
  - Ghost Writer – (1977)
  - One Eyed Jack – (1978)
  - Matador & More... – (1992)
- Chaka Khan – Chaka – (1979)
- Leah Kunkel – I Run with Trouble – (1980)
- Melissa Manchester:
  - Melissa – (1975)
  - Emergency – (1983)
  - O Heaven (How You've Changed to Me) (single) – (1974)
- Kate Markowitz – Map of the World – (2003)
- Arnold McCuller:
  - Back To Front – (2002)
  - Circa 1990 – (2003)
- Michael McDonald – Take It to Heart – (1990)
- Jimmy McGriff – Red Beans [Groove Merchant] – (1977)
- Bette Midler:
  - Songs for the New Depression – (1976)
  - Some People's Lives – (1990)
  - For the Boys – (1991)
  - Experience the Divine – (1993)
  - 3 for One – (2000)
  - Bette – (2000)
- Teddy Pendergrass – Love Language – (1984)
- Philly Groove Records Presents: Deeper In The Groove - Merr-Gond-Round - (2014)
- Pousette-Dart Band:
  - Pousette-Dart Band 3 – (1979)
  - Never Enough – (1980)
- Bonnie Raitt:
  - Streetlights – (1974)
  - Nick of Time – (1989)
  - Luck of the Draw – (1991)
  - Longing in Their Hearts – (1994)
- Linda Ronstadt – Living in the U.S.A. – (1978)
- Helen Reddy - Imagination – (1983)
- Brenda Russell – Paris Rain – (2000)
- Carole Bayer Sager – Too – (1978)
- David Sanborn:
  - Hideaway – (1979)
  - Time Again – (2003)
- Boz Scaggs:
  - Middle Man – (1980)
  - Other Roads – (1988)
- Timothy B. Schmit:
  - Playin' It Cool – (1984)
  - Tell Me the Truth – (1990)
- Phoebe Snow – Rock Away – (1981)
- Ringo Starr:
  - Ringo's Rotogravure – (1976)
  - Ringo the 4th – (1977)
- James Taylor:
  - Flag – (1979)
  - Dad Loves His Work – (1981)
  - That's Why I'm Here – (1985)
  - Never Die Young – (1988)
  - New Moon Shine – (1991)
  - Live – (1993)
  - Hourglass – (1997)
  - Greatest Hits Volume 2 – (2000)
  - October Road – (2002)
  - Covers - (2008)
  - Other Covers - (2009)
  - Before This World – (2015)
- Luther Vandross:
  - Busy Body – (1983)
  - Give Me the Reason – (1986)
  - Any Love – (1988)
  - Your Secret Love – (1996)
- Jennifer Warnes – Famous Blue Raincoat – (1987)

== Filmography ==
Year	Film	Role
1993	Squibnocket	Himself
2013	20 Feet from Stardom	Himself
