= Bruce Roberts (singer) =

American singer and songwriter

Bruce Roberts is an American singer and songwriter. His songs have been recorded by such artists as The Pointer Sisters, Donna Summer, Barbra Streisand, Jeffrey Osborne, Whitney Houston, Alice Cooper and Laura Branigan. He has released three albums as a solo artist including Intimacy (1995), which featured musical and vocal contributions by many notable artists; Elton John and Kristine W contributed to the single "When the Money's Gone".

Bruce Roberts' song catalog is published by Reservoir Media Management.

Roberts, according to Danny Bonaduce, provided most of the vocals accredited to Bonaduce on his self-titled album Danny Bonaduce in 1973.

== Collaborations ==
In 1979, Roberts co-wrote Donna Summer and Barbra Streisand's number one disco duet, "No More Tears (Enough Is Enough)", with Paul Jabara. The same year he also cowrote the ballad "All Through The Night" with Summer for her multiplatinum selling album Bad Girls, a song which he in turn covered on his 1980 album Cool Fool and again on his 1995 album Intimacy.

He also enjoyed a long successful songwriting partnership with Carole Bayer Sager in the late 70s that included songs like "I'm Coming Home Again", "Starmaker" and "You're Moving Out Today" recorded by artists including Dusty Springfield, Judy Collins and Bette Midler.

== Discography ==
=== Albums ===
- Bruce Roberts (1977)
- Cool Fool (1980)
- Intimacy (1995)

=== Singles ===
- "Starmaker" (1977)
- "When the Money's Gone" (1995)
- "Whenever There Is Love" (with Donna Summer) (1996)

=== Notable songwriting credits ===
- "Anyone Can See" by Irene Cara
- "All Through The Night" (co-written with Donna Summer), by Donna Summer, and K.C. & The Sunshine Band
- "Don't You Love Me Anymore?" by Engelbert Humperdinck
- "Flames of Paradise" by Jennifer Rush & Elton John
- "Fool That I Am" by Rita Coolidge
- "Goldmine" by The Pointer Sisters
- "How You Once Loved Me" by Dionne Warwick
- "I'm Coming Home Again" by Carole Bayer Sager also recorded by Dusty Springfield, Gladys Knight and Barry Manilow
- "I Could Have Loved You" by The Moments
- "I Don't Break Easily" by Barbra Streisand and Engelbert Humperdinck
- "I Don't Wanna Go" by The Moments, Samantha Sang and La Toya Jackson
- "I Got Your Love" by Donna Summer
- "I'll Make You Music" by Beverly Bremers
- "The Lucky One" by Laura Branigan
- "The Main Event/Fight" by Barbra Streisand
- "Me-U=Blue" by Glenn Medeiros and The Stylistics
- "No More Tears (Enough Is Enough)" duet by Donna Summer & Barbra Streisand
- "Oh, People" by Patti LaBelle
- "Only My Heart Talkin'" by Alice Cooper
- "Our Night", co-written with Carole Bayer Sager and released on Shaun Cassidy's 1978 album Under Wraps
- "Picnic in the Rain" by Naomi Campbell
- "Shock Me" duet by Whitney Houston & Jermaine Jackson (co-written with Andrew Goldmark)
- "Skybird" by Tony Orlando and Dawn
- "Some Other World" (co-written with Elton John) by Elton John
- "Sometimes Like Butterflies" (co-written with Donna Summer), by Donna Summer, and Dusty Springfield
- "Starmaker" by Judy Collins and The Kids from "Fame"
- "Stronger Than Before" by Carole Bayer Sager, also recorded by Chaka Khan and Dionne Warwick (co-written with Bayer Sager and Burt Bacharach)
- "Stronger Together" by Jessica Sanchez
- "To Paris with Love" by Donna Summer
- "Twist My Arm" by The Pointer Sisters
- "Unison" by Junior
- "We Should Be Together" by Cliff Richard
- "Whisper in the Dark" by Dionne Warwick
- "Whenever There Is Love" duet by Donna Summer & Bruce Roberts
- "You Should Be Mine" by Jeffrey Osborne
- "You're Moving Out Today" by Carole Bayer Sager and Bette Midler
- "You're the Only One" by Dolly Parton
