= Carole Bayer Sager =

American lyricist, singer, songwriter, and painter (born 1944)

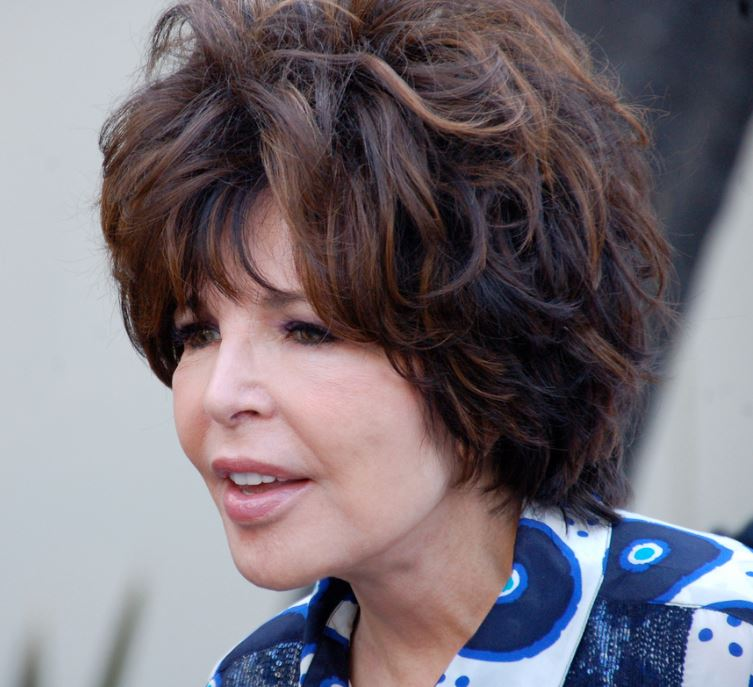
- Bayer Sager in 2013
- Born: Carol Bayer; March 8, 1944 (age 82); New York City, U.S.
- Education: New York University
- Occupations: Lyricist; singer; songwriter
- Spouses: Andrew Sager (m. 1970–1978); Burt Bacharach (m. 1982–1991); Robert A. Daly (m. 1996)

Carole Bayer Sager (born Carol Bayer; March 8, 1944) is an American lyricist, singer, and songwriter.

== Early life and career ==
Carole Bayer was born in New York City, to Anita Nathan Bayer and Eli Bayer. Her family was Jewish. She graduated from New York University, where she majored in English, dramatic arts, and speech. She had already written her first pop hit, "A Groovy Kind of Love", with Toni Wine, while still a student at New York City's High School of Music and Art. It was recorded by the British Invasion band The Mindbenders, whose version was a worldwide hit, reaching number 2 on the Billboard Hot 100. This song was later recorded by Sonny & Cher, Petula Clark, and Phil Collins, whose rendition for the film Buster reached number one on both the UK Singles Chart and Billboard Hot 100 in 1988.

== Solo albums ==
Bayer Sager's first recording as a singer was the 1977 album Carole Bayer Sager, produced by Brooks Arthur. It included the hit single "You're Moving Out Today", a song which she co-wrote with Bette Midler and Bruce Roberts. The single became a 1977 Australian number one single and also reached number 6 in the UK Singles Chart in June 1977. Paul Buckmaster provided horn and string arrangements for the album. The album also included Bayer Sager's versions of two songs previously recorded by Melissa Manchester – "Home to Myself" and the oft-covered "Come in from the Rain". It went platinum in Japan and Australia.

It was followed by ...Too in 1978, also produced by Brooks Arthur, which included all-star cameos by the likes of Michael McDonald, Alice Cooper and Manchester. It also included the first recording of "It's the Falling in Love" which subsequently would be covered by Michael Jackson on his 1979 multi-platinum album Off the Wall.

In 1981, she recorded Sometimes Late at Night, which was co-produced by future husband Burt Bacharach with Brooks Arthur, and included the single "Stronger Than Before", later recorded by Chaka Khan and Dionne Warwick. The song became Bayer Sager's only song to hit Billboard's American Top 40 as a performer, peaking at number 30. The track "Just Friends" featured a vocal cameo from Michael Jackson, who also co-produced the track with Bacharach, while Neil Diamond also co-produced and played guitar on the track "On The Way To The Sky" which he also recorded as the title track of his concurrent album On the Way to the Sky.

== Songwriting ==
Bayer Sager had many hits during the 1970s. She co-wrote many songs with Melissa Manchester that appeared on Manchester's solo albums of the period, including "Come in from the Rain" and "Midnight Blue", which would go on to be covered by many other artists. She also worked with Australian songwriter Peter Allen, crafting hits such as "I'd Rather Leave While I'm in Love" "You and Me (We Wanted It All)" and "Don't Cry Out Loud". She also scored major hits collaborating with Albert Hammond ("When I Need You") and Bruce Roberts ("You're the Only One").

With Marvin Hamlisch and Neil Simon, she wrote the lyrics for the 1978 stage musical They're Playing Our Song, which was loosely based on her relationship with Hamlisch. The musical ran for over three years on Broadway. She also wrote the lyrics, whilst Hamlisch composed the music, for "Nobody Does It Better", the Bond theme sung by Carly Simon in the film The Spy Who Loved Me (1977).

Many of Bayer Sager's 1980s songs were co-written with her husband at the time, composer Burt Bacharach. She served as executive producer for the eponymous solo album of June Pointer, of The Pointer Sisters, in 1989.

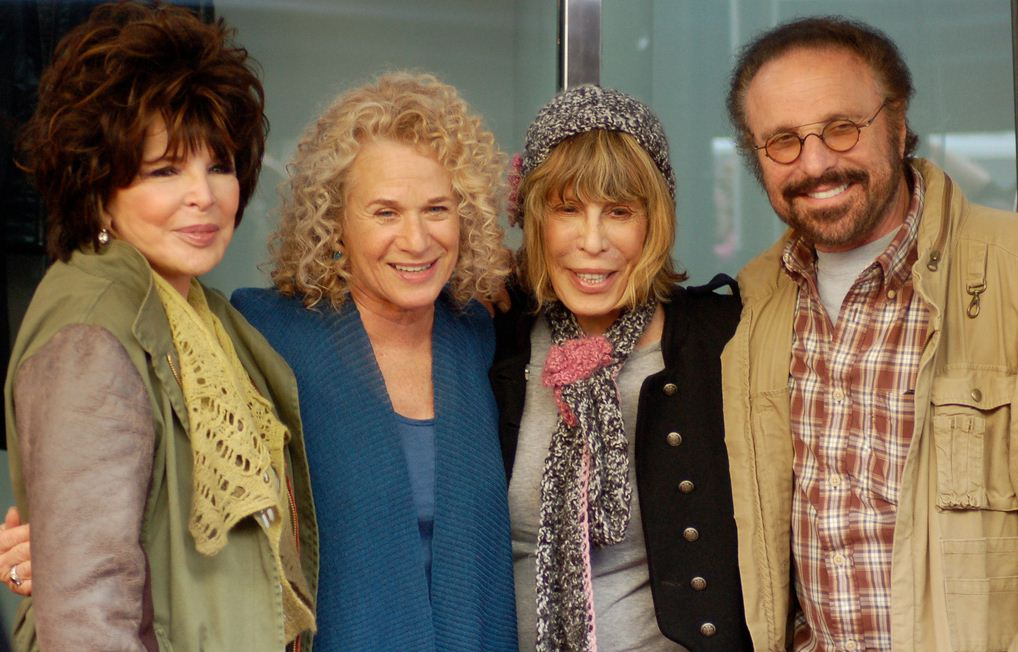
Bayer Sager with Carole King, Cynthia Weil, and Barry Mann in December 2012

Bayer Sager has won an Academy Award (out of six nominations), a Grammy Award (out of nine nominations) and two Golden Globe Awards (out of seven nominations). She was inducted into the Songwriters Hall of Fame in 1987. Bayer Sager won the Academy Award for Best Original Song in 1982 for "Arthur's Theme (Best That You Can Do)", theme song to the romantic comedy Arthur.

Bayer Sager received the Grammy Award for Song of the Year in 1987 for the song "That's What Friends Are For", which she co-wrote with Bacharach. This song was originally written for the 1982 film Night Shift, for which it was recorded by Rod Stewart. The song was popularized in a 1986 cover version by Dionne Warwick, Stevie Wonder, Gladys Knight and Elton John.

Her song with David Foster, "The Prayer", originally recorded by Celine Dion and Andrea Bocelli, won the Golden Globe, and is often performed at weddings and funerals. In April 2020, Lady Gaga closed out her One World: Together at Home concert with a new rendition of "The Prayer", co-performed with Dion, Bocelli, John Legend and classical pianist Lang Lang. The performance helped raise $127 million for the World Health Organization battling COVID-19 cases in America.

She was awarded a star on the Hollywood Walk of Fame and was inducted into the Songwriters Hall of Fame. Bayer Sager received the New York University Steinhardt Distinguished Alumni award in 2006. She received the 2019 "Johnny Mercer Award" from the Songwriters Hall of Fame during their 50th-anniversary induction ceremony. She was the sixth female songwriter to ever be awarded this honor.

She occasionally collaborated with Neil Sedaka, with 11 songs co-written between the two.

Alongside Bruce Roberts and Kenneth "Babyface" Edmonds, Bayer Sager co-wrote "Stronger Together", sung by Jessica Sanchez. The song was played after Hillary Clinton's speech at the 2016 Democratic National Convention. The song is named after the slogan that the Clinton campaign used as a show of uniting behind the Democratic nominee.

In 2018, she co-wrote the song "Living in the Moment" for the film Book Club, recorded by Katharine McPhee, as well as two songs on Barbra Streisand's album Walls: "Better Angels" and "What's on My Mind". She contributed lyrics to "Ghost Town" on Kanye West's album Ye.

In May 2022, she was honored with a BMI Icon award at the 70th Annual BMI Pop Awards

== Personal life ==
She married record-producer Andrew Sager in 1970, and they divorced in 1978. Bayer Sager was involved in a romantic relationship with composer Marvin Hamlisch in the late 1970s. On April 3, 1982, she married composer and pianist Burt Bacharach after over a year's cohabitation. In December 1985 the couple adopted an infant son, whom they named Cristopher Elton Bacharach. Bacharach and Sager divorced in 1991.

Since June 1996, Bayer Sager has been married to Robert Daly, former chairman of Warner Bros. and former chairman / CEO of the Los Angeles Dodgers baseball team, and currently chairman of the American Film Institute (AFI). They live in Los Angeles.

In October 2016, Bayer Sager published her memoir, They're Playing Our Song: A Memoir (Simon & Schuster). She also narrated the audiobook version.

== Discography ==
=== Studio albums ===
List of albums, with Australian chart positions
Title	Album details	Peak chart positions	Certification
Title	Album details	AUS	Certification
Carole Bayer Sager	Released: 1977; Format: LP; Label: Elektra	4	AUS: Gold
...Too	Released: 1978; Format: LP; Label: Elektra	68	
Sometimes Late at Night	Released: 1981; Format: LP; Label: Boardwalk	—	

=== Charting singles ===
List of singles, with Australian chart positions
Year	Title	Peak chart positions
Year	Title	AUS
1977	"You're Moving Out Today"	1
1977	"Don't Wish Too Hard"	82
1978	"I'd Rather Leave While I'm in Love"	98

== Selected songs, with artists who performed them ==
- "Anyone at All" (theme from You've Got Mail) – Carole King
- "Arthur's Theme (Best That You Can Do)", from Arthur – Christopher Cross
- "Better Off Alone" (Song from The Magic Is You) – Shirley Bassey
- "Crazy" – Neil Diamond
- "We Were Made For Each Other" – The Monkees
- "Don't Cry Out Loud" – Melissa Manchester
- "Don't Say You Love Me" – The Corrs
- "Ever Changing Times (ft Michael McDonald)" – Aretha Franklin
- "Everything Old Is New Again" – Peter Allen
- "Fly Away' – Peter Allen
- "Fool That I Am' (song from Coast to Coast) – Rita Coolidge
- "Front Page Story" – Neil Diamond
- "Ghost Town" – (from Ye) – Kanye West
- "Groovy Kind of Love" – The Mindbenders and Phil Collins
- "Heartlight" – Neil Diamond
- "How Do The Fools Survive" – Doobie Brothers
- "I Never Loved You Anyway" – The Corrs
- "I'd Rather Leave While I'm in Love" – Rita Coolidge
- "I'm Guilty" – Neil Diamond
- "It's The Falling in Love" – Michael Jackson
- "Maybe" (themes from Romantic Comedy and Making Love) – Roberta Flack
- "Midnight Blue" – Melissa Manchester
- "On My Own" – Patti LaBelle & Michael McDonald
- "On The Way to the Sky" – Neil Diamond
- "One Hello" (theme from I Ought to Be in Pictures) – Randy Crawford
- "One Man" (co-written with Bayer Sager) – Sheena Easton
- "Our Night" – Shaun Cassidy
- "Past Forever" – Agnetha Fältskog, of ABBA
- "The Prayer" (theme from Quest for Camelot) – Céline Dion and Andrea Bocelli; Josh Groban and Charlotte Church
- "Sleep With Me Tonight" – Neil Diamond, Patti LaBelle
- "Someone Else's Eyes" – Aretha Franklin ft Michael McDonald
- "Starmaker" – Judy Collins; The Kids from "Fame"
- "Through the Eyes of Love" (theme from Ice Castles) – Judy Collins
- "Try It on My Own" – Whitney Houston
- "Turn Around" – Neil Diamond
- "We've Had Enough" – Michael Jackson
- "When You Love Someone" (theme from Forget Paris) – Anita Baker
- "Why Should I Care" (written for True Crime) Diana Krall
- "You Are My Life" – Michael Jackson
- "You're Moving Out Today" – Carole Bayer Sager
- Melissa Manchester ("Midnight Blue", "Come in From The Rain", "Don't Cry Out Loud", theme from Ice Castles (Through the Eyes of Love), etc..)
- Richard Marx ("Now and Forever")
- Bette Midler ("You're Moving Out Today", "Blueberry Pie", "My One True Friend" etc.)
- Liza Minnelli ("More Than I Like You", "Don't Cry Out Loud")
- Dolly Parton ("You're the Only One", "Heartbreaker", "The Day I Fall in Love" (theme from Beethoven's 2nd))
- Steve Perry ("I Stand Alone")
- Bernadette Peters ("Only Wounded", "Sweet Alibis")
- Kenny Rogers ("They Don't Make Them Like They Used To" (theme from Tough Guys))
- Diana Ross ("It's My Turn", "Come in from the Rain")
- Leo Sayer ("When I Need You")
- Frank Sinatra ("You and Me (We Wanted It All)")
- Carly Simon ("Nobody Does It Better" (theme from The Spy Who Loved Me))
- Dusty Springfield ("Dream On", "Home to Myself", "I'd Rather Leave While I'm in Love", etc...)
- Rod Stewart ("That's What Friends Are For" (closing theme from Night Shift))
- Barbra Streisand ("Niagara", "Love Light", "You and Me for Always", "One More Time Around", "Better Angels", "What's On My Mind" )
- Dionne Warwick ("Extravagant Gestures", "Love Power", "Stronger Than Before", etc...)
- Dionne & Friends (Gladys Knight, Elton John and Stevie Wonder) ("That's What Friends Are For")

== Works for stage ==
- Georgy (1970) – musical – lyricist
- Dancin' (1978) – revue – featured lyricist for If It Feels Good, Let It Ride and Easy
- They're Playing Our Song (1979) – musical – lyricist
- Up in One (1979) – revue – featured songwriter
- The Madwoman of Central Park West (1979) – musical – featured songwriter
- Barbara Cook: A Concert for the Theatre (1987) – concert – featured songwriter
- The Boy from Oz (2003) – musical – featured songwriter with Peter Allen

== Filmography ==
- American Idol (2007) – guest judge

== Awards and nominations ==
=== Academy Awards ===
The Academy Awards are awarded annually by the Academy of Motion Picture Arts and Sciences. Bayer Sager has earned 1 award from 6 nominations.

Year	Nominated work	Award	Result
1978	"Nobody Does It Better"	Best Original Song	Nominated
1980	"Theme from Ice Castles (Through the Eyes of Love)"	Best Original Song	Nominated
1982	"Arthur's Theme (Best That You Can Do)"	Best Original Song	Won
1994	"The Day I Fall in Love"	Best Original Song	Nominated
1995	"Look What Love Has Done"	Best Original Song	Nominated
1999	"The Prayer"	Best Original Song	Nominated

=== Golden Globe Awards ===
The Golden Globe Awards are awarded annually by the Golden Globe Foundation. Bayer Sager has earned 2 awards from 11 nominations.

Year	Nominated work	Award	Result
1978	"The Spy Who Loved Me"	Best Original Song - Motion Picture	Nominated
1980	"Theme from Ice Castles (Through the Eyes of Love)"	Best Original Song - Motion Picture	Nominated
1980	Better Than Ever"	Best Original Song - Motion Picture	Nominated
1982	"Arthur's Theme (Best That You Can Do)"	Best Original Song - Motion Picture	Won
1983	"Making Love"	Best Original Song - Motion Picture	Nominated
1987	"They Don't Make Them Like They Used to"	Best Original Song - Motion Picture	Nominated
1994	"The Day I Fall in Love"	Best Original Song - Motion Picture	Nominated
1995	"Look What Love Has Done"	Best Original Song - Motion Picture	Nominated
1999	"The Prayer"	Best Original Song - Motion Picture	Won
2008	"Grace Is Gone"	Best Original Song - Motion Picture	Nominated

=== Grammy Awards ===
The Grammy Awards are awarded annually by the National Academy of Recording Arts and Sciences. Bayer Sager has earned 1 award from 9 nominations.

Year	Nominated work	Award	Result
1978	"Nobody Does It Better"	Song of The Year	Nominated
1980	They're Playing Our Song	Best Cast Show Album	Nominated
1980	Ice Castles	Best Album of Original Score Written for A Motion Picture Or A Television Special	Nominated
1982	"Arthur's Theme (Best That You Can Do"	Song of The Year	Nominated
1987	"That's What Friends Are For"	Song of The Year	Won
1987	"That's What Friends Are For"	Record of The Year	Nominated
1995	"The Day I Fall In Love"	Best Song Written Specifically For A Motion Picture Or For Television	Nominated

=== Primetime Emmy Awards ===
The Primetime Emmy Awards are awarded annually by the Academy of Television Arts & Sciences. Bayer Sager has earned 1 nomination.

Year	Nominated work	Award	Result
2000	"Without You"	Outstanding Music and Lyrics	Nominated
