= Charlotte Crossley =

American singer and actress

- Born: Chicago, Illinois, U.S.
- Genres: R&B; house; post-disco
- Occupations: Singer; actress
- Instrument: Vocals
- Years active: 1971–present
- Labels: Columbia Records; Planet Records
- Formerly of: Harlettes

Charlotte Crossley, nicknamed "Charlo", is an American singer and actress, best known for her roles in the musical theatrical productions of Hairspray, The Color Purple, Jesus Christ Superstar, as a member of the Harlettes in Bette Midler's Clams On The Half-Shell Revue, and for her appearance in 20 Feet from Stardom. She has been described as a comedienne.

Crossley won the 2005 NAACP Theatre Award for Best Supporting Actress for her performance in the first national tour of Hairspray.

== Early life ==
Crossley grew up in Chicago, where she studied music and theatre.

== Career ==
In the early '70's, Crossley auditioned for Jesus Christ, Superstar and was chosen to join the cast. She sang in the choir of the original Broadway cast album of Jesus Christ Superstar (a Decca Broadway Original Cast). In those years, she appeared in Hair.

Crossley joined Bette Midler, "The Divine Miss M", in 1973.

Crossley has performed as a featured artist in musicals and films including Hairspray, taking over the role of Motormouth Maybelle on Broadway on September 2, 2008, Jesus Christ Superstar, 20 Feet From Stardom, Sister Act, Sister Act 2, and supported Robin Williams' performance of "Blame Canada" on the Oscars, among others.

As a session singer, Crossley has recorded feature and background vocals for Bette Midler, Luther Vandross, David Lasley, Boz Scaggs, Marc Shaiman, Kiss, Chaka Khan, Brenda Russell, Barry Manilow, and The Brecker Brothers, among others. She is a featured artist on The Dreamgirls Dance Project singing "And I Am Telling You I'm Not Going" and with Merry Clayton, Scherrie Payne and Pam Vincent singing "Dreamgirls".

=== The Harlettes ===
She was a member of the Harlettes performing on stage in Bette Midler tours and concerts including The Divine Miss M Tour, Clams On The Half-Shell Revue, The Depression Tour, Intimate Evening with Bette, and recording as The Harlettes and Formerly Of The Harlettes.

=== Full Swing ===
Crossley was a member of the group Full Swing, a trio of singers, alongside Lorraine Feather and Steve March. She was cited by a journalist of the Los Angeles Times as "the group's strongest vocal personality, singing with a burry-edged sound that brought character..."

The Springfield Leader wrote ""Full Swing" Lorraine Feather, Charlotte Crossley and Steve March recreate the vitality and romance of 'the swing era music with today's technology .. and style."

=== 20 Feet From Stardom ===
Crossley appears in the Academy Award-winning documentary 20 Feet From Stardom.

== Live appearances ==
Crossley makes live appearances in venues including 54 Below and Lincoln Center, where she performed in a tribute Laura Nyro show in August 2012 along with Sarah Dash, Nona Hendryx, Melba Moore, Desmond Child & Rouge, Felix Cavaliere, Toni Wine, Ula Hedwig, and others.
