= Anita Baker discography =

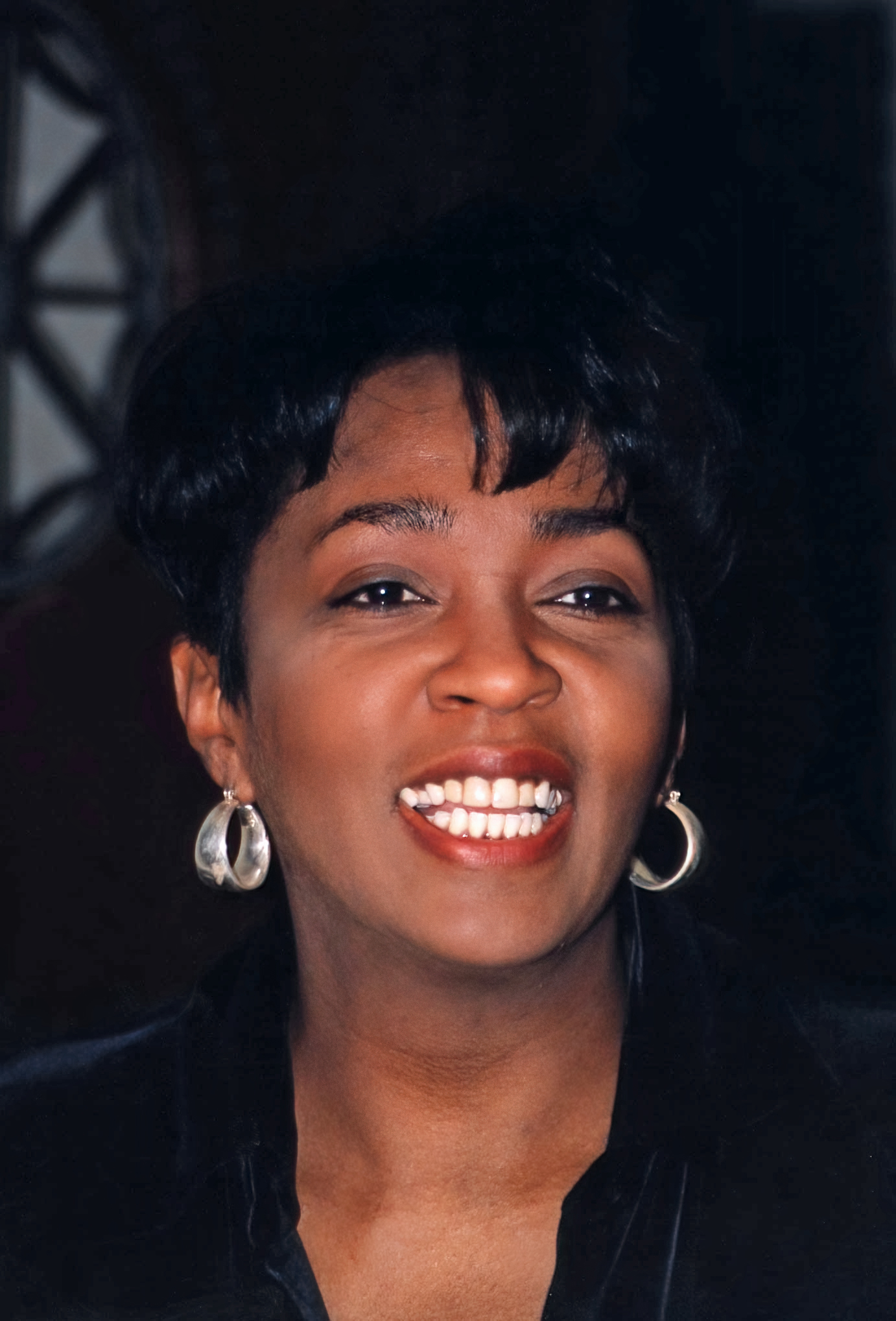
- Baker in 1998
- Studio albums: 7
- Live albums: 1
- Compilation albums: 1
- Singles: 24
- Other albums: 1

American singer-songwriter Anita Baker has released six studio albums, one compilation & live album, and 24 singles. Referred as the "Queen of Romantic Quiet-Storm R&B/Soul", she is considered to be one of the most successful and influential R&B artists of all-time. According to Recording Industry Association of America, Baker has sold 13 million certified albums in the United States, including three multi-platinum albums. She has also scored 5 number-one hits on Billboard's Adult R&B Airplay and 13 top ten hits on Billboard's Hot R&B/Hip-Hop Songs.

A staple act since the 1980s, Baker's debut album The Songstress peaked at number 12 on Billboard's Top R&B Albums and has sold nearly half a million copies worldwide. Rapture (1986) remains the best-selling album of her career, with sales of over 8 million copies worldwide. It peaked at number 11 on Billboard 200 and is certified 5× Platinum in the United States. Giving You the Best That I Got (1988) became Baker's first and only album to reach number one on Billboard 200. The title track also gave her the highest-peaking single of her career on the Billboard Hot 100, peaking at number three. To date, the album has sold over 5 million copies worldwide. In 1990, Baker released her fourth studio-album Compositions. It peaked at number five on the Billboard 200 and number seven on the UK Albums Chart. It reportedly sold a million copies in its first week alone and eventually became her third consecutive platinum-selling album in the US. As of 1995, Baker's catalog has sold 17 million albums worldwide.

Ten years after her prior studio record, Baker made her comeback with her sixth studio album My Everything. It debuted at number four on US Billboard 200, selling 132,000 copies in its first week and was eventually certified gold by the RIAA. Her 2005 holiday album, Christmas Fantasy, remains her most recent album to date.

== Albums ==
=== Studio albums ===
Title	Album details	Peak chart positions										Sales	Certifications (sales threshold)
Title	Album details	US	US R&B	US Jazz	AUS	CAN	GER	NL	NZ	SWE	UK	Sales	Certifications (sales threshold)
The Songstress ^{[A]}	Released: May 31, 1983; Label: Beverly Glen	139	12	—	—	—	—	—	—	—	—	WW: 500,000	
Rapture	Released: March 20, 1986; Label: Elektra	11	1	24	33	25	50	—	12	32	13	WW: 8,000,000	RIAA: 5× Platinum; BPI: Platinum; MC: Gold
Giving You the Best That I Got	Released: October 4, 1988; Label: Elektra	1	1	—	42	—	—	—	15	21	9	WW: 5,000,000	RIAA: 3× Platinum; BPI: Gold
Compositions	Released: June 12, 1990; Label: Elektra	5	3	4	54	13	36	17	20	22	7		RIAA: Platinum; BPI: Gold
Rhythm of Love	Released: August 23, 1994; Label: Elektra	3	1	—	128	35	—	42	26	33	14		RIAA: 2× Platinum
My Everything	Released: September 7, 2004; Label: Blue Note	4	1	—	—	85	—	89	—	—	142		RIAA: Gold
Christmas Fantasy	Released: October 4, 2005; Label: Blue Note	120	31	—	—	—	—	—	—	—	—		
"—" denotes releases that did not chart or were not released in that territory.

- ^{A} The Songstress was re-released by Elektra Records on November 12, 1991, and peaked at number 90 on the Hot R&B Albums chart.

=== Live albums ===
Title	Album details	Peak chart positions
Title	Album details	US R&B
A Night of Rapture Live	Released: June 8, 2004; Label: Atlantic/Rhino	35

=== Compilation albums ===
Title	Album details	Peak chart positions			Certifications (sales threshold)
Title	Album details	US	US R&B	UK	Certifications (sales threshold)
The Best of Anita Baker	Released: June 18, 2002; Label: Rhino	118	29	49	RIAA: Platinum

== Singles ==
Year	Title	Peak chart positions									Album
Year	Title	US	US R&B	US A/C	AUS	CAN	IRE	NL	NZ	UK	Album
1983	"No More Tears" (A-side)	—	49	—	—	—	—	—	—	—	The Songstress
1983	"Will You Be Mine" (B-side)	—	87	—	—	—	—	—	—	—	The Songstress
1983	"Angel"	—	5	—	—	—	—	—	—	—	The Songstress
1983	"You're the Best Thing Yet"	—	28	—	—	—	—	—	—	—	The Songstress
1984	"Feel the Need"	—	67	—	—	—	—	—	—	—	The Songstress
1986	"Watch Your Step"	—	23	—	—	—	—	—	—	—	Rapture
1986	"Sweet Love"	8	2	3	—	21	10	47	—	13	Rapture
1986	"Caught Up in the Rapture"	37	6	9	—	—	—	—	44	51	Rapture
1987	"Same Ole Love (365 Days a Year)"	44	8	6	—	—	—	—	—	100	Rapture
1987	"No One in the World"	44	5	9	—	—	—	—	—	—	Rapture
1987	"Ain't No Need to Worry" (with The Winans)	—	15	—	—	—	—	—	—	—	Decisions
1988	"Giving You the Best That I Got"	3	1	1	171	11	—	—	25	55	Giving You the Best That I Got
1988	"Just Because"	14	1	4	—	18	—	—	—	93	Giving You the Best That I Got
1989	"Lead Me Into Love"	—	4	32	—	92	—	—	—	—	Giving You the Best That I Got
1990	"Talk to Me"	44	3	4	139	50	—	—	—	68	Compositions
1990	"Soul Inspiration"	72	16	11	—	62	—	—	—	—	Compositions
1990	"Fairy Tales"	—	8	27	—	—	—	—	—	—	Compositions
1994	"Body and Soul"	36	4	25	—	47	—	—	—	48	Rhythm of Love
1994	"I Apologize"	74	8	—	—	—	—	—	—	86	Rhythm of Love
1995	"It's Been You"	—	32	—	—	—	—	—	—	—	Rhythm of Love
1995	"When You Love Someone" (with James Ingram)	111	71	39	—	—	—	—	—	—	Forget Paris: Music from the Original Motion Picture Soundtrack
2004	"You're My Everything"	74	25	40	—	—	—	—	—	104	My Everything
2004	"How Does It Feel"	121	41	—	—	—	—	—	—	—	My Everything
2005	"Serious"	—	83	—	—	—	—	—	—	—	My Everything
2012	"Lately"	107	15	—	—	—	—	—	—	—	Only Forever (CANCELLED)
"—" denotes releases that did not chart or were not released in that territory.

== Other appearances ==
Year	Song	Album
1992	"How Fast, How Far"	Barcelona Gold
1994	"God Bless the Child" (live version with George Duke)	Grammy's Greatest Moments Volume IV
