= Anita Live! =

2002–04 concert tour by Anita Baker

- Tour by Anita Baker
- Location: North America
- Start date: December 17, 2002
- End date: July 5, 2004
- No. of shows: 26

Anita Baker concert chronology
- Rhythm of Love World Tour (1994–95); Anita Live! (2002–04); An Evening with Anita Baker (2007–09)

Anita Live! was a concert tour by American recording artist Anita Baker. After taking an eight-year hiatus from touring to spend more time with her family, in 2002 Baker decided to perform again. Baker performed seven dates in December, which eventually led to a two-year outing in North America, from 2003 to 2004.

While touring in 2003, Baker recorded songs for a new album, My Everything released September 2004. On select dates in late 2003 and 2004, she performed a few tracks from the album.

== Opening act ==
- William Troxler (Comedian)

== Set list ==
1. "Mystery"
2. "Sweet Love"
3. "Been So Long"
4. "No One in the World"
5. "Same Ole Love (365 Days a Year)"
6. "Just Because"
7. "Lead Me Into Love"
8. "Caught Up in the Rapture"
9. "Watch Your Step"
10. "Angel"
11. "How Does It Feel?" ^{2} (NEW)
12. "Talk to Me" ^{1}
13. "I Apologize"
14. "Body and Soul"
15. "My Everything" ^{2} (NEW)
16. "No More Tears" ^{1}
17. "Rules" ^{1}
18. "You Bring Me Joy"
19. "You Belong to Me"

Encore

20. "Giving You the Best That I Got"
21. "Fairy Tales"

^{1} performed at select dates in North America.
^{2} performed in late 2003 and 2004 at select dates in North America.

=== Notes ===
- Baker's set included the main songs scheduled to perform during tour; on select dates, she ask the crowd to choose certain songs for her to sing during the show, which was not included in set list.
- During the tour on select dates, Baker performed new songs, "My Everything", "Serious" and "How Does It Feel?" from her new 2004 album, My Everything.

== Band ==
- Music Director/Drums: Ricky Lawson
- Bass guitar: Nathan East
- Percussion: Joe Mardin

== Tour dates ==
Date	City	Country	Venue
North America
December 17, 2002	Westbury	United States	Westbury Music Fair
December 18, 2002	Westbury	United States	Westbury Music Fair
December 20, 2002	Westbury	United States	Westbury Music Fair
December 21, 2002	Westbury	United States	Westbury Music Fair
December 27, 2002	Merrillville	United States	Star Plaza Theatre
December 28, 2002	Merrillville	United States	Star Plaza Theatre
December 31, 2002	Houston	United States	Arena Theatre
January 31, 2003	Uncasville	United States	Mohegan Sun Arena
March 21, 2003	Cleveland	United States	State Theatre
April 4, 2003	Oakland	United States	Paramount Theatre
April 18, 2003	Newark	United States	Prudential Hall
April 19, 2003	Newark	United States	Prudential Hall
May 24, 2003	Vienna	United States	Filene Center
June 18, 2003	Sunrise	United States	Sinatra Theater
June 21, 2003	Pittsburgh	United States	Heinz Hall for the Performing Arts
June 26, 2003	Hampton	United States	Hampton Coliseum
July 3, 2003	St. Louis	United States	Fox Theatre
July 5, 2003	New Orleans	United States	Louisiana Superdome
July 8, 2003	Baltimore	United States	1st Mariner Arena
July 30, 2003	Woodinville	United States	Chateau Ste. Michelle Amphitheatre
July 31, 2003	Woodinville	United States	Chateau Ste. Michelle Amphitheatre
August 2, 2003	Hobart	United States	St. Sava Serbian Hall
December 27, 2003	Richmond	United States	Landmark Theater
December 28, 2003	Greensboro	United States	Greensboro Coliseum Special Events Center
December 29, 2003	Oakland	United States	The Arena in Oakland
December 30, 2003	Las Vegas	United States	MGM Grand Garden Arena
December 31, 2003	Phoenix	United States	Celebrity Theatre
January 2, 2004	Minneapolis	United States	Orpheum Theatre
January 3, 2004	Milwaukee	United States	Riverside Theater

Notes

- All tour dates are not listed for North America.
