= Rhythm of Love World Tour =

1994–95 concert tour by Anita Baker

- Tour by Anita Baker
- Associated album: Rhythm of Love
- Start date: December 14, 1994
- End date: December 31, 1995
- Legs: 3
- No. of shows: 65 in North America; 6 in Europe; 71 in total
- Box office: $12 million

Anita Baker concert chronology
- Compositions World Tour (1990); Rhythm of Love World Tour (1994–95); Anita Live! (2002–04)

The Rhythm of Love Tour was a 1994–1995 concert tour by American R&B artist Anita Baker, launched in support of her multiplatinum-certified album, Rhythm of Love (1994). With over 70 dates, the trek started on December 14, 1994, in New Orleans, Louisiana, and ended in Miami, Florida, on December 31, 1995; January and October 1995 served as breaks. The tour covered the United States and Europe, visiting Germany, Italy, Netherlands and the United Kingdom.

== Opening act ==
- George Duke (London, UK)

== Set list ==
1. "Sweet Love"
2. "Been So Long"
3. "Mystery"
4. "No One in the World"
5. "Same Ole Love (365 Days of Year)"
6. "Watch Your Step"
7. "Caught Up in the Rapture"
8. "Rhythm of Love"^{1}
9. "My Funny Valentine"
10. Diana Ross & Tina Turner Medley: "Stop! In the Name of Love"/"Proud Mary"
11. "Giving You the Best That I Got"
12. "Talk to Me"
13. "Rules" ^{1}
14. "Fairy Tales"
15. "Body and Soul"
16. "You Belong to me"

Encore

1. "I Apologize"
2. "You Bring Me Joy"

^{1} performed only at select dates in North America and Europe.

== Band ==
- Music director, drums: Ricky Lawson
- Guitars: John McCurry
- Bass, cello: Nathan East
- Percussion: Joe Mardin
- Synth Bass: Luis Resto
- Background vocals: Perri Sisters (Lori, Sharon, Darlene & Carol)

== Tour dates ==
Date	City	Country	Venue
North America
December 14, 1994	New Orleans	United States	Saenger Theatre
December 16, 1994	New Orleans	United States	Saenger Theatre
December 17, 1994	New Orleans	United States	Saenger Theatre
December 27, 1994	Los Angeles	United States	Universal Amphitheatre
December 28, 1994	Los Angeles	United States	Universal Amphitheatre
December 30, 1994	Los Angeles	United States	Universal Amphitheatre
December 31, 1994	Los Angeles	United States	Universal Amphitheatre
February 1, 1995	Chicago	United States	Arie Crown Theater
February 2, 1995	Chicago	United States	Arie Crown Theater
February 4, 1995	Chicago	United States	Arie Crown Theater
February 5, 1995	Chicago	United States	Arie Crown Theater
February 8, 1995	Minneapolis	United States	Northrop Auditorium
February 10, 1995	St. Louis	United States	Fox Theatre
February 12, 1995	Auburn Hills	United States	The Palace of Auburn Hills
March 3, 1995	Atlantic City	United States	Etess Arena
March 4, 1995	Atlantic City	United States	Etess Arena
March 7, 1995	Atlanta	United States	Fox Theatre
March 8, 1995	Atlanta	United States	Fox Theatre
March 10, 1995	Miami	United States	James L. Knight Center
March 11, 1995	Miami	United States	James L. Knight Center
March 31, 1995	Las Vegas	United States	MGM Grand Garden Arena
April 2, 1995	Oakland	United States	Paramount Theatre
April 3, 1995	Oakland	United States	Paramount Theatre
April 5, 1995	Oakland	United States	Paramount Theatre
April 6, 1995	Oakland	United States	Paramount Theatre
April 10, 1995	Cleveland	United States	State Theatre
April 11, 1995	Cleveland	United States	State Theatre
April 13, 1995	Boston	United States	Wang Theatre
April 14, 1995	Boston	United States	Wang Theatre
April 29, 1995	New York City	United States	Radio City Music Hall
April 30, 1995	New York City	United States	Radio City Music Hall
May 3, 1995	New York City	United States	Radio City Music Hall
May 4, 1995	New York City	United States	Radio City Music Hall
May 7, 1995	New York City	United States	Radio City Music Hall
May 11, 1995	Ledyard	United States	Fox Theater
June 22, 1995	Hampton	United States	Hampton Coliseum
June 25, 1995	Raleigh	United States	Hardee's Walnut Creek Amphitheatre
June 30, 1995	Houston	United States	The Summit
July 1, 1995	Dallas	United States	Coca-Cola Starplex Amphitheatre
July 3, 1995	New Orleans	United States	Louisiana Superdome
July 4, 1995	Memphis	United States	Mid-South Coliseum
July 12, 1995	Holmdel Township	United States	Garden State Arts Center
July 13, 1995	Darien	United States	Darien Lake Performing Arts Center
July 15, 1995	Fairfax	United States	Patriot Center
July 21, 1995	Detroit	United States	Fox Theatre
July 25, 1995	Milwaukee	United States	Marcus Amphitheater
July 27, 1995	Pittsburgh	United States	Civic Arena
July 29, 1995	Cincinnati	United States	Riverfront Stadium
July 30, 1995	Tinley Park	United States	New World Music Theatre
August 17, 1995	Charlotte	United States	Carowinds Paladium
August 18, 1995	Philadelphia	United States	CoreStates Spectrum
August 20, 1995	Wantagh	United States	Jones Beach Amphitheater
August 24, 1995	Atlanta	United States	Chastain Park Amphitheater
August 26, 1995	Baltimore	United States	Baltimore Arena
September 1, 1995	Los Angeles	United States	Greek Theatre
September 2, 1995	Los Angeles	United States	Greek Theatre
September 4, 1995	Phoenix	United States	Desert Sky Pavilion
Europe
November 4, 1995	Ramstein-Miesenbach	Germany	Ramstein Air Base
November 6, 1995	Rotterdam	Netherlands	Rotterdam Ahoy
November 8, 1995	Birmingham	England	National Exhibition Centre
November 10, 1995	London	England	Wembley Arena
November 11, 1995	Manchester	England	Manchester Apollo
November 14, 1995	Milan	Italy	Teatro Smeraldo
North America
December 12, 1995	North Charleston	United States	North Charleston Coliseum
December 13, 1995	Nashville	United States	Grand Ole Opry House
December 15, 1995	Merrillville	United States	Star Plaza Theatre
December 16, 1995	Merrillville	United States	Star Plaza Theatre
December 27, 1995	Tampa	United States	Tampa Bay Performing Arts Center
December 28, 1995	Orlando	United States	Bob Carr Auditorium
December 30, 1995	Fort Myers	United States	Harborside Event Center
December 31, 1995	Miami	United States	James L. Knight Center
