= An Evening with Anita Baker =

2007–09 concert tour by Anita Baker

- Tour by Anita Baker
- Start date: May 25, 2007
- End date: November 7, 2009
- Legs: 4
- No. of shows: 60 in North America; 2 in Africa; 2 in Europe; 64 in total

Anita Baker concert chronology
- Anita Live! (2002–04); An Evening with Anita Baker (2007–09); Anita Baker: Farewell Concert Series (2018–19)

An Evening with Anita Baker was a 2007–09 concert tour by American R&B singer Anita Baker. The outing started in the summer of 2007, visiting Europe and North America.

Baker performed two free shows in Brooklyn, New York on August 13, for the 25th Annual Martin Luther King Concert Series and August 16, for the 29th Annual Seaside Summer Concert Series.

The tour resumed in 2008, Baker also performed shows in the Caribbeans and Africa, and a North America second leg outing that ended in November 2009.

== Opening act ==
- Charlie Wilson (Brooklyn, New York)

== Set list ==
1. "Mystery"
2. "Sweet Love"
3. "Been So Long"
4. "No One in the World"
5. "Same Ole Love (365 Days a Year)"
6. "Caught Up in the Rapture"
7. "Talk to Me"
8. "Priceless"
9. "Good Love"
10. "Angel"
11. "Body and Soul"
12. "It's Been You"
13. "I Apologize" ^{1}
14. "Lonely"
15. "No More Tears"
16. "Fairy Tales"

Encore

17. "Giving You the Best That I Got"
18. "You Bring Me Joy"

^{1} performed on select dates in North America and Europe.

=== Notes ===
- February 14, 2009 at Radio City Music Hall in New York City, Baker performed her hit song "Angel" with singer Mary J. Blige.
- November 7, 2009 at Nokia Theatre in Los Angeles, her performance of "Fairy Tales" included singers Tyrese, Chante Moore and George Duke.

== Band ==
- Musical director/drums: Ricky Lawson
- Bass guitar: Nathan East

== Tour dates ==
Date	City	Country	Venue
North America
May 25, 2007	Las Vegas	United States	Joint
May 26, 2007	Indio	United States	Fantasy Springs Events Center
Europe
June 26, 2007	London	England	Royal Albert Hall
June 27, 2007	London	England	Royal Albert Hall
North America
July 15, 2007	Grand Prairie	United States	Nokia Theatre at Grand Prairie
July 21, 2007	Clarkston	United States	DTE Energy Music Theatre
July 22, 2007	Atlanta	United States	Chastain Park Amphitheater
July 26, 2007	New York City	United States	Radio City Music Hall
July 27, 2007	Ledyard	United States	MGM Grand Theatre
August 13, 2007	Brooklyn	United States	Wingate Field
August 16, 2007	Brooklyn	United States	Asser Levy Park
August 18, 2007	Atlantic City	United States	Etess Arena
October 26, 2007	St. Louis	United States	Fox Theatre
October 27, 2007	Southaven	United States	DeSoto Civic Center
November 2, 2007	San Francisco	United States	Golden Gate Theatre
November 3, 2007	Los Angeles	United States	Nokia Theatre L.A. Live
November 4, 2007	Seattle	United States	McCaw Hall
December 1, 2007	Chicago	United States	Chicago Theatre
December 5, 2007	Greenville	United States	Peace Concert Hall
December 7, 2007	Charenton	United States	Pavilion at Cypress Bayou
December 8, 2007	Charenton	United States	Pavilion at Cypress Bayou
December 13, 2007	West Palm Beach	United States	Kravis Center for the Performing Arts
December 14, 2007	Clearwater	United States	Ruth Eckerd Hall
December 16, 2007	Miami	United States	James L. Knight Center
January 24, 2008	Montego Bay	Jamaica	Aqueduct at Rose Hall
January 27, 2008	Raleigh	United States	RBC Center
May 11, 2008	Castries	Saint Lucia	St. Lucia Jazz Festival
June 13, 2008	Vienna	United States	Filene Center
June 20, 2008	Aspen	United States	Rio Grande Park
June 21, 2008	Primm	United States	Star of the Desert Arena
July 4, 2008	Albuquerque	United States	The Showroom at Isleta Casino
July 10, 2008	Hollywood	United States	Hard Rock Live
July 12, 2008	Clarkston	United States	DTE Energy Music Theatre
July 24, 2008	Hollywood	United States	Hard Rock Live
July 31, 2008	Rama	Canada	Casino Rama Entertainment Centre
August 2, 2008	Providenciales	Turks and Caicos Islands	Turtle Cove Marina
August 7, 2008	Ledyard	United States	MGM Grand Theatre
August 15, 2008	Baltimore	United States	Pier Six Concert Pavilion
August 16, 2008	Portsmouth	United States	nTelos Wireless Pavilion
Africa
August 29, 2008	Abuja	Nigeria	International Conference Center
August 30, 2008	Abuja	Nigeria	International Conference Center
North America
September 7, 2008	Prior Lake	United States	Mystic Showroom
September 19, 2008	Prior Lake	United States	Mystic Showroom
September 20, 2008	Kansas City	United States	Midland Theatre
September 26, 2008	Los Angeles	United States	Greek Theatre
September 27, 2008	Pala	United States	Pala Events Center
October 23, 2008	Detroit	United States	Sound Board at MotorCity Casino
November 7, 2008	Robinsonville	United States	Bluesville Showcase Nightclub
November 8, 2008	Greeneville	United States	Niswonger Performing Arts Center
November 20, 2008	Santa Ynez	United States	Chumash Casino
November 28, 2008	Nashville	United States	Sommet Center
November 30, 2008	Birmingham	United States	BJCC Arena
December 13, 2008	Merrillville	United States	Star Plaza Theatre
February 13, 2009	New York City	United States	Radio City Music Hall
February 14, 2009	New York City	United States	Radio City Music Hall
June 27, 2009	Atlanta	United States	Chastain Park Amphitheater
July 18, 2009	Costa Mesa	United States	Pacific Amphitheatre
July 27, 2009	New York City	United States	Wingate Field
July 31, 2009	Clarkston	United States	DTE Energy Music Theatre
August 22, 2009	Concord	United States	Sleep Train Pavilion
September 5, 2009	Atlantic City	United States	Circus Maximus Theater
September 18, 2009	Washington, D.C.	United States	DAR Constitution Hall
September 19, 2009	Newark	United States	Prudential Hall
October 4, 2009	Mobile	United States	Miller Lite Stage
November 6, 2009	Rancho Mirage	United States	Agua Caliente Casino
November 7, 2009	Los Angeles	United States	Nokia Theatre L.A. Live

== Recording and future release ==
- Her performance at DTE Energy Music Theatre in Clarkston, Michigan, on July 12, 2008, was recorded. On September 19, 2008, BusyBoy Productions filmed her entire An Evening with Anita Baker concert at Mystic Lake Casino Hotel in Prior Lake, Minnesota, for Baker's up-and-coming DVD and B-roll footage for promotional purposes. However, these projects have not been commercially released yet.
