= Compositions World Tour =

1990 concert tour by Anita Baker

- Tour by Anita Baker
- Associated album: Compositions
- Start date: May 22, 1990
- End date: December 1, 1990
- Legs: 5
- No. of shows: 50 in North America; 3 in Europe; 3 in Asia; 56 in total

Anita Baker concert chronology
- Giving You the Best World Tour (1988); Compositions World Tour (1990); Rhythm of Love World Tour (1994–95)

The Compositions World Tour was a 1990 concert tour by American recording artist Anita Baker in support of her Platinum selling album Compositions. The tour was to kick off in early May with four sold-out shows at the Sunrise Music Theatre in Miami, Florida. The dates where soon cancelled due to Baker becoming vocally ill the prior week before the scheduled shows. The tour resumed in late May with dates scheduled in North America, Europe and Asia. Baker performed four-consecutive shows in various cities in North America, which included Merrillville, Indiana and Miami, Florida.

== Opening acts ==
- Pamela A Smith

== Set list ==
1. "Sweet Love"
2. "Been So Long"
3. "Mystery"
4. "No One in the World"
5. "Same Ole Love (365 Days of Year)"
6. "Giving You the Best That I Got"
7. "Angel"^{1}
8. "Rules"
9. "Good Enough"
10. "Lonely"
11. "No One to Blame"
12. "Soul Inspiration"^{1}
13. "You Bring Me Joy"
14. "Caught Up in the Rapture"

Encore

15. "Fairy Tales"
16. "Talk to Me"

^{1} performed on select dates in North America

== Additional notes ==
- During the tour, in select cities, Baker's encore was either "Talk to Me" or "Fairy Tales", or both songs were performed.

== Band ==
- Music Director/Guitar: Ray Fuller
- Keyboards: Darrell Smith
- Drums: Rayford Griffin
- Bass guitar: Larry Kimpel
- Keyboards: Donn Wyatt
- Saxophone: Everette Harp
- Background vocals: Perri Sisters (Lori, Darlene, Sharon)

== Tour dates ==
Date	City	Country	Venue	Tickets sold / available	Revenue
North America
May 22, 1990	New York City	United States	Radio City Music Hall	23,824 / 23,824	$774,515
May 23, 1990	New York City	United States	Radio City Music Hall	23,824 / 23,824	$774,515
May 24, 1990	New York City	United States	Radio City Music Hall	23,824 / 23,824	$774,515
May 25, 1990	New York City	United States	Radio City Music Hall	23,824 / 23,824	$774,515
May 26, 1990	New York City	United States	Radio City Music Hall	23,824 / 23,824	$774,515
Europe
June 15, 1990	London	England	Wembley Arena		
June 16, 1990	London	England	Wembley Arena		
June 20, 1990	Birmingham	England	NEC Arena		
North America
June 30, 1990	Clarkston	United States	Pine Knob Music Theatre		
July 1, 1990	Clarkston	United States	Pine Knob Music Theatre		
July 3, 1990	Milwaukee	United States	Marcus Amphitheater		
July 4, 1990	Tinley Park	United States	World Music Theatre		
July 6, 1990	Philadelphia	United States	Mann Music Center		
July 8, 1990	Pittsburgh	United States	Star Lake Amphitheater		
July 9, 1990	Vienna	United States	Wolf Trap Arts Center		
July 10, 1990	Vienna	United States	Wolf Trap Arts Center		
July 13, 1990	Portland	United States	Memorial Coliseum		
July 14, 1990	Seattle	United States	Seattle Center Coliseum		
July 16, 1990	San Carlos	United States	Circle Star Theater		
July 17, 1990	Anaheim	United States	Anaheim Arena		
August 1, 1990	Denver	United States	Fiddler's Green Amphitheatre		
August 3, 1990	Portland	United States	Music Festival of Jazz		
August 4, 1990	George	United States	Gorge Amphitheatre		
August 8, 1990	Concord	United States	Concord Pavilion		
August 10, 1990	Sacramento	United States	Cal Expo Amphitheatre		
August 11, 1990	Mountain View	United States	Shoreline Amphitheatre		
August 12, 1990	Irvine	United States	Irvine Meadows Amphitheatre		
August 14, 1990	San Diego	United States	Open Air Theatre		
August 15, 1990	Phoenix	United States	Arizona Veterans Memorial Coliseum		
August 17, 1990	Dallas	United States	Starplex Amphitheatre	12,652 / 20,000	$257,830
August 18, 1990	Houston	United States	The Summit		
Asia
September 2, 1990	Yokohama	Japan	Kanagawa Prefectural Civic Hall		
September 3, 1990	Tokyo	Japan	Nippon Budōkan		
September 4, 1990	Tokyo	Japan	Nippon Budōkan		
North America
September 19, 1990	Los Angeles	United States	Greek Theatre	24,246 / 24,700	$719,443
September 20, 1990	Los Angeles	United States	Greek Theatre	24,246 / 24,700	$719,443
September 22, 1990	Los Angeles	United States	Greek Theatre	24,246 / 24,700	$719,443
September 23, 1990	Los Angeles	United States	Greek Theatre	24,246 / 24,700	$719,443
September 25, 1990	Austin	United States	Frank Erwin Center		
September 27, 1990	Houston	United States	Woodlands Pavilion		
October 4, 1990	Sunrise	United States	Sunrise Musical Theater		
October 5, 1990	Sunrise	United States	Sunrise Musical Theater		
October 7, 1990	Sunrise	United States	Sunrise Musical Theater		
October 8, 1990	Sunrise	United States	Sunrise Musical Theater		
October 11, 1990	Jacksonville	United States	Jacksonville Coliseum		
October 12, 1990	Orlando	United States	Orlando Arena	9,723 / 9,723	$207,743
October 14, 1990	Tampa	United States	USF Sun Dome	6,449 / 7,500	$136,058
October 17, 1990	Detroit	United States	Fox Theatre	19,108 / 19,108	$556,660
October 18, 1990	Detroit	United States	Fox Theatre	19,108 / 19,108	$556,660
October 20, 1990	Detroit	United States	Fox Theatre	19,108 / 19,108	$556,660
October 21, 1990	Detroit	United States	Fox Theatre	19,108 / 19,108	$556,660
November 15, 1990	Atlanta	United States	Fox Theatre	9,356 / 9,356	$254,398
November 16, 1990	Atlanta	United States	Fox Theatre	9,356 / 9,356	$254,398
November 20, 1990	Macon	United States	Macon Coliseum		
November 27, 1990	Merrillville	United States	Star Plaza Theatre	13,600 / 13,600	$421,600
November 28, 1990	Merrillville	United States	Star Plaza Theatre	13,600 / 13,600	$421,600
November 30, 1990	Merrillville	United States	Star Plaza Theatre	13,600 / 13,600	$421,600
December 1, 1990	Merrillville	United States	Star Plaza Theatre	13,600 / 13,600	$421,600
December 4, 1990	Devon	United States	Valley Forge Music Fair	8,796 / 8,796	$261,420
December 5, 1990	Devon	United States	Valley Forge Music Fair	8,796 / 8,796	$261,420
December 7, 1990	Devon	United States	Valley Forge Music Fair	8,796 / 8,796	$261,420

Notes

- Not all concerts dates are listed in North America and Europe.
