= Giving You the Best World Tour =

1988–89 concert tour by Anita Baker

The Heat
- Tour by Anita Baker and Luther Vandross
- Poster to the concert in Pittsburgh
- Location: North America
- Associated album: Giving You the Best That I Got; Any Love
- Start date: September 28, 1988
- End date: December 31, 1988
- Legs: 2
- No. of shows: 51
Anita Baker tour chronology
The Rapture Tour (1986–87)	The Heat (1988)	Compositions World Tour (1990)
Luther Vandross tour chronology
Give Me the Reason Tour (1987)	The Heat (1988)	Any Love World Tour (1989)

The Heat (also known as The Heat: Luther & Anita Live!) was a co-headlining concert tour by American recording artists Anita Baker and Luther Vandross. The tour primarily played over 50 shows in the United States during the fall and winter of 1988. Shows in New York City, Los Angeles and Rosemont were instant sellouts.

Baker had a brief promo tour mere weeks before this tour started. She later toured internationally with George Benson, for shows in Europe and Asia, under the title "Anita Baker in Concert". Following the conclusion of their joint tour, Vandross launched his "Any Love World Tour" in January 1989.

== Opening act ==
- Sinbad

== Set lists ==
The following set lists are from the concert held on September 28, 1988, at the Capital Centre in Landover, Maryland. They do not represent all concerts for the duration of the tour.

=== Anita Baker ===
1. "Sweet Love"
2. "Been So Long"
3. "No One in the World"
4. "Good Love"
5. "I'm The One" (performed by Perri Sisters)
6. "Lead Me Into Love"
7. "Watch Your Step"
8. "God Bless the Child"
9. "Caught Up in the Rapture"
10. "Priceless"
11. "Another Part of Me"
12. "Love Overboard"
13. "You Bring Me Joy"
14. "Giving You the Best That I Got"

=== Luther Vandross ===
1. "Never Too Much"
2. "So Amazing"
3. "I Really Didn't Mean It"
4. "For You to Love"
5. "Come Back"
6. "Any Love"
7. "Love Won't Let Me Wait"
8. "Give Me the Reason"
9. "Searching"
10. "Superstar/Until You Come Back to Me (That's What I'm Gonna Do)"
11. "A House Is Not a Home"
12. "She Won't Talk to Me"
13. "Wait for Love"
14. "Stop to Love"

== Tour dates ==
List of 1988 concerts
Date	City	Country	Venue
September 28, 1988	Landover	United States	Capital Centre
September 29, 1988	Landover	United States	Capital Centre
September 30, 1988	Landover	United States	Capital Centre
October 1, 1988	Philadelphia	United States	The Spectrum
October 2, 1988	Philadelphia	United States	The Spectrum
October 4, 1988	New York City	United States	Madison Square Garden
October 5, 1988	New York City	United States	Madison Square Garden
October 6, 1988	New York City	United States	Madison Square Garden
October 7, 1988	New York City	United States	Madison Square Garden
October 8, 1988	New York City	United States	Madison Square Garden
October 9, 1988	New York City	United States	Madison Square Garden
October 13, 1988	Houston	United States	The Summit
October 14, 1988	Houston	United States	The Summit
October 15, 1988	Dallas	United States	Reunion Arena
October 16, 1988	Dallas	United States	Reunion Arena
October 27, 1988	Hampton	United States	Hampton Coliseum
October 28, 1988	Columbia	United States	Carolina Coliseum
October 29, 1988	Augusta	United States	Augusta-Richmond County Civic Center
October 30, 1988	Chattanooga	United States	UTC Arena
November 2, 1988	Detroit	United States	Joe Louis Arena
November 5, 1988	Charlotte	United States	Charlotte Coliseum
November 6, 1988	Greensboro	United States	Greensboro Coliseum
November 10, 1988	Atlanta	United States	Omni Coliseum
November 11, 1988	Atlanta	United States	Omni Coliseum
November 12, 1988	Birmingham	United States	BJCC Coliseum
November 13, 1988	New Orleans	United States	Louisiana Superdome
November 16, 1988	Memphis	United States	Mid-South Coliseum
November 17, 1988	St. Louis	United States	St. Louis Arena
November 19, 1988	Oklahoma City	United States	Myriad Convention Center
November 20, 1988	Kansas City	United States	Kemper Arena
November 21, 1988	Saint Paul	United States	St. Paul Civic Center
November 24, 1988	Tucson	United States	Tucson Community Center
November 25, 1988	San Diego	United States	San Diego Sports Arena
November 27, 1988	Oakland	United States	Oakland–Alameda County Coliseum Arena
November 28, 1988	Oakland	United States	Oakland–Alameda County Coliseum Arena
December 1, 1988	Los Angeles	United States	Los Angeles Memorial Sports Arena
December 2, 1988	Los Angeles	United States	Los Angeles Memorial Sports Arena
December 3, 1988	Los Angeles	United States	Los Angeles Memorial Sports Arena
December 4, 1988	Los Angeles	United States	Los Angeles Memorial Sports Arena
December 5, 1988	Los Angeles	United States	Los Angeles Memorial Sports Arena
December 8, 1988	Indianapolis	United States	Market Square Arena
December 10, 1988	Cincinnati	United States	Riverfront Coliseum
December 11, 1988	Pittsburgh	United States	Civic Arena
December 13, 1988	Boston	United States	Boston Garden
December 16, 1988	Hartford	United States	Hartford Civic Center
December 18, 1988	Milwaukee	United States	Bradley Center
December 27, 1988	Rosemont	United States	Rosemont Horizon
December 28, 1988	Rosemont	United States	Rosemont Horizon
December 29, 1988	Rosemont	United States	Rosemont Horizon
December 30, 1988	Rosemont	United States	Rosemont Horizon
December 31, 1988	Rosemont	United States	Rosemont Horizon

=== Box office score data ===
Venue	City	Tickets sold / available	Gross revenue
Capital Centre	Landover	53,007 / 58,140 (91%)	$1,325,175
The Spectrum	Philadelphia	37,002 / 37,002 (100%)	$889,747
Madison Square Garden	New York City	61,281 / 61,281 (100%)	$1,660,425
The Summit	Houston	24,239 / 34,000 (71%)	$581,655
Greensboro Coliseum	Greensboro	14,778 / 15,529 (95%}	$332,505
Omni Coliseum	Atlanta	33,660 / 33,660 (100%)	$804,575
BJCC Coliseum	Birmingham	18,511 / 18,511 (100%)	$394,493
Louisiana Superdome	New Orleans	17,699 / 20,000 (88%)	$360,730
San Diego Sports Arena	San Diego	9,649 / 14,578 (66%)	$225,700
Oakland–Alameda County Coliseum Arena	Oakland	26,816 / 26,816 (100%)	$603,360
Riverfront Coliseum	Cincinnati	14,416 / 17,474 (82%)	$360,400
Civic Arena	Pittsburgh	15,892 / 15,892 (100%)	$379,307
Bradley Center	Milwaukee	12,300 / 18,000 (68%)	$287,875
Rosemont Horizon	Rosemont	68,284 / 68,284 (100%)	$1,792,430
TOTAL		407,534 / 439,167 (93%)	$9,998,377

== Band ==
Baker

- Musical director/guitar: Ray Fuller
- Keyboards: Darrell Smith
- Drums: Rayford Griffin
- Bass: Sekou Bunch
- Percussions: Bill Summers
- Saxophone: Everette Harp
- Keyboards: Donn Wyatt
- Background vocals: Perri and Gina Taylor

Vandross

- Musical director: Nat Adderley Jr.
- Keyboards: John "Skip" Anderson
- Bass guitar: Eluriel "Tinker" Barfield
- Guitar: Doc Powell
- Drums: Ivan Hampden Jr.
- Percussions: Steve Kroon
- Backing vocals: Cindy Mizelle, Ava Cherry, Lisa Fischer, Paulette McWilliams and Kevin Owens
