= The Best of Anita Baker =

Greatest hits album by Anita Baker
- Released: June 18, 2002
- Recorded: 1983–2002
- Genre: R&B; soul; smooth jazz; soul jazz
- Length: US 79:21
- Label: Rhino Records

Anita Baker chronology
Rhythm of Love (1994)	The Best of Anita Baker (2002)	My Everything (2004)

Professional ratings
Review scores
Source	Rating
AllMusic	4.5/5 stars

The Best of Anita Baker is a compilation album by the American R&B/soul singer Anita Baker. It was released on June 18, 2002, in the United States by Rhino Records, and compiles material from Baker's career spanning 1983–2002. As of March 2004, the album has sold 402,000 copies and been certified Gold by the RIAA. The album spent 92 weeks on the Top R&B/Hip-Hop Albums chart, becoming the longest-charting album by a female artist on the chart and 16 weeks on the Billboard 200.

The album was released in the UK as Sweet Love: The Very Best of Anita Baker, with a slightly different track listing and running order.

== The Best of Anita Baker track listing ==
1. "Angel" (Single Version) (From The Songstress, 1983) - 4:29
2. "You're the Best Thing Yet" (From The Songstress) - 5:36
3. "No More Tears" (From The Songstress) - 5:35
4. "Sweet Love" (From Rapture, 1986) - 4:22
5. "Caught Up in the Rapture" (Single Version) (From Rapture) - 4:08
6. "You Bring Me Joy" (From Rapture) - 4:24
7. "Same Ole Love (365 Days a Year)" (From Rapture) - 4:03
8. "No One in the World" (From Rapture) - 4:10
9. "Ain't No Need to Worry" (Single Version) (Featuring The Winans) (From The Winans' Decisions, 1987) - 4:18
10. "Giving You the Best That I Got" (Single Version) (From Giving You the Best That I Got, 1988) - 3:53
11. "Good Love" (From Giving You the Best That I Got) - 5:33
12. "Just Because" (Single Version) (From Giving You the Best That I Got) - 4:22
13. "Lead Me Into Love" (Single Version) (From Giving You the Best That I Got) - 4:08
14. "Fairy Tales" (Edit) (From Compositions, 1990) - 4:16
15. "Talk to Me" (Single Version) (From Compositions) - 3:53
16. "Body and Soul" (Radio Edit) (From Rhythm of Love, 1994) - 3:58
17. "I Apologize" (Single Version) (From Rhythm of Love) - 4:16
18. "It's Been You" (Single Version) (From Rhythm of Love) - 4:08

== Sweet Love: The Very Best of Anita Baker track listing ==
1. "Caught Up In The Rapture" (Single Version) - 4:12
2. "Giving You The Best That I Got" (Single Version) - 3:54
3. "Sweet Love" - 4:24
4. "Body and Soul" (Radio Edit) - 3:54
5. "Just Because" (Single Version) - 4:21
6. "I Apologize" (Single Version) - 4:16
7. "Rhythm of Love" (From Rhythm of Love) - 5:50
8. "Soul Inspiration" (Single Version) (From Compositions) - 4:01
9. "Lead Me Into Love" (Single Version) - 4:07
10. "Angel" (Single Version) - 4:28
11. "Same Ole Love" (365 Days a Year) - 4:04
12. "Fairy Tales" (Edit) - 4:16
13. "Talk To Me" (Single Version) - 3:54
14. "Good Enough" (Single Version) (From Giving You the Best That I Got) - 3:59
15. "No More Tears" - 5:40
16. "When You Love Someone" (Feat. James Ingram) (From the Forget Paris Soundtrack Album) - 4:10
17. "You Bring Me Joy" - 4:20
18. "No One In The World" - 4:07

== Certifications ==
Region	Certification	Certified units/sales
United States (RIAA)	Platinum	1,000,000^{^}
^{^} Shipments figures based on certification alone.
