= Giving You the Best That I Got =

Giving You the Best That I Got may refer to:

- Giving You the Best That I Got (album), a 1988 album by Anita Baker
  - "Giving You the Best That I Got" (song), a 1988 song by Baker
