= Chapter Eight =

Chapter Eight refers to an eighth chapter in a book.

Chapter Eight, Chapter 8, or Chapter VIII may also refer to:

== Music ==
- Chapter 8 (band), a Detroit soul group
- Chapter 8 (Chapter 8 album), 1979
- Chapter 8 (g.o.d album), 2014

== Television ==
- "Chapter 8" (American Horror Story)
- "Chapter 8" (Eastbound & Down)
- "Chapter 8" (House of Cards)
- "Chapter 8" (Legion)
- "Chapter 8" (Star Wars: Clone Wars), an episode of Star Wars: Clone Wars
- "Chapter 8" (Uncoupled)
- "Chapter 8: Redemption", an episode of The Mandalorian
- "Chapter Eight" (Boston Public)
- "Chapter Eight: The Burial", an episode of Chilling Adventures of Sabrina
- "Chapter Eight: Gay Gardens", an episode of Special
- "Chapter Eight: It's Alright, Ma (I'm Only Bleeding)", an episode of Katy Keene
- "Chapter Eight: Know Your Truth", an episode of Barry
- "Chapter Eight: The Outsiders", an episode of Riverdale
- Episodes of Stranger Things:
  - "Chapter Eight: The Upside Down", season 1
  - "Chapter Eight: The Mind Flayer", season 2
  - "Chapter Eight: The Battle of Starcourt", season 3
  - "Chapter Eight: Papa", season 4
  - "Chapter Eight: The Rightside Up", season 5

== Other uses ==
- Chapter VIII of the Constitution of Australia
- Chapter VIII of the United Nations Charter
