= The Rapture Tour =

1986–87 concert tour by Anita Baker

Rapture Tour
- Tour by Anita Baker
- Poster to the concert in Montreux, Switzerland
- Associated album: Rapture
- Start date: March 16, 1986
- End date: November 29, 1987
- Legs: 8
- No. of shows: 174 in North America; 12 in Europe; 186 total

Anita Baker concert chronology
- Rapture Tour (1986–87); Giving You the Best World Tour (1988)

The Rapture Tour was the first headlining concert tour by American recording artist Anita Baker in support of her second studio album Rapture (1986). The tour started in mid-March 1986, visiting several cities throughout North America and Europe. In 1987, Baker kicked off a North America second leg trek, which included seven dates in Los Angeles at the Beverly Theatre in January, including two and three-night dates in Merrillville, Indiana, New York City and Miami, Florida. The outing included four sold-out shows scheduled in Washington, D.C., and three consecutive dates for the second visit in Merrillville, Indiana.

== Concert synopsis ==
The tour consisted of a selection of songs from Baker's 1983 debut, The Songstress and the majority of the Rapture album. For each performance, Baker would perform songs from both albums, and also include a song from other artists. For example, she performed "You've Changed" by Sarah Vaughan for one show, and Van Morrison's "Moondance" for another. She performed several shows throughout the week in Los Angeles, with gospel/R&B group the Perri Sisters joining as background vocals and toured with Baker for the remainder of the tour.

== The Band ==
- Music Director: Bobby Lyle
- Guitar: Donald Griffin
- Keyboards: Bobby Lyle
- Percussions: Garry Glenn
- Saxophone: Gerald Albright
- Bass: Gerald Albright
- Drums: James Bradley Jr
- Backing vocalists (1986): Tanya Boyd, Saundra Simmons, and Natalie Jackson
- Backing vocalists (1987): Perri Sisters, Gina Taylor, and Freida Williams

== Opening acts ==
- Perri Sisters (North America, select dates)
- Pieces of a Dream (North America, November–December 1986, select dates)
- Durell Coleman (North America, February 1987)
- Rhonda Hansome (North America, July–September 1987, select dates)
- Nat Augustin (London)
- Tease (Baltimore)
- The Controllers (New York City, September 1986)
- The Rose Brothers (St. Louis, August 1986)

== Setlist ==
The following setlist was obtained from the concert held on January 2, 1987, at the Beverly Theatre in Los Angeles, California. It does not represent all concerts for the duration of the tour.

1. "Caught Up in the Rapture"
2. "Will You Be Mine"
3. "Angel"
4. "Mystery"
5. "Stop to Love"
6. "You're the Best Thing Yet"
7. "Same Ole Love (365 Days a Year)"
8. "You Bring Me Joy"
9. "Watch Your Step"
10. "Sweet Love
11. "No One in the World"
12. "Been So Long"
13. "No More Tears"
14. "Blessed"

Notes

*On July 16, 1986, in Montreux, Switzerland, "Moondance" by Van Morrison was performed.

== Tour dates ==
Date	City	Country	Venue
North America
March 16, 1986	Detroit, MI	United States	State Theatre
March 17, 1986	Chicago, IL	United States	Auditorium Theatre
March 19, 1986	Merrillville, IN	United States	Holiday Star Theatre
March 21, 1986	Cincinnati, OH	United States	Taft Theatre
March 22, 1986	Cleveland, OH	United States	State Theatre
March 24, 1986	Buffalo, NY	United States	Shea's O'Connell Center
March 25, 1986	Albany, NY	United States	Palace Theatre
March 26, 1986	Hartford, CT	United States	Bushnell Memorial Hall
March 28, 1986	Providence, RI	United States	Providence Performing Arts Center
March 29, 1986	Lowell, MA	United States	Lowell Memorial Auditorium
April 7, 1986	Red Bank, NJ	United States	Count Basie Theatre
April 8, 1986	New York, NY	United States	Alice Tully Hall
April 9, 1986	Devon, PA	United States	Valley Forge Music Fair
April 11, 1986	Washington, DC	United States	Warner Theatre
June 9, 1986	Milwaukee, WI	United States	Riverside Theater
June 10, 1986	Minneapolis, MN	United States	State Theatre
June 11, 1986	Joliet, IL	United States	Rialto Square Theatre
June 13, 1986	South Bend, IN	United States	Morris Civic Auditorium
June 14, 1986	Grand Rapids, MI	United States	Grand Rapids Civic Auditorium
June 16, 1986	Syracuse, NY	United States	Landmark Theatre
June 17, 1986	Hyannis, MA	United States	Cape Cod Melody Tent
June 18, 1986	Cohasset, MA	United States	South Shore Music Circus
June 19, 1986	Port Chester, NY	United States	Capitol Theatre
June 20, 1986	Newark, NJ	United States	Newark Symphony Hall
June 22, 1986	Westbury, NY	United States	Westbury Music Fair
June 23, 1986	Westbury, NY	United States	Westbury Music Fair
June 25, 1986^{[A]}	New York, NY	United States	Avery Fisher Hall
June 27, 1986	Baltimore, MD	United States	Meyerhoff Symphony Hall
June 28, 1986	Norfolk, VA	United States	Chrysler Hall
June 29, 1986	Raleigh, NC	United States	Raleigh Memorial Auditorium
June 30, 1986	Charlotte, NC	United States	Ovens Auditorium
Europe
July 16, 1986^{[B]}	Montreux	Switzerland	Montreux Casino
July 17, 1986	Paris	France	Élysée Montmartre
July 18, 1986	Brussels	Belgium	Ancienne Belgique
July 19, 1986	Amsterdam	Netherlands	Melkweg
July 22, 1986	Cardiff	United Kingdom	St David's Hall
July 23, 1986	Wolverhampton	United Kingdom	Wolverhampton Civic Hall
July 24, 1986	Manchester	United Kingdom	Manchester Apollo
July 26, 1986	London	United Kingdom	Hammersmith Odeon
July 27, 1986	London	United Kingdom	Hammersmith Odeon
North America
August 1, 1986	Detroit, MI	United States	Masonic Temple Theater
August 8, 1986	Washington, DC	United States	DAR Constitution Hall
August 10, 1986	Louisville, KY	United States	Louisville Gardens
August 11, 1986	Nashville, TN	United States	War Memorial Auditorium
August 12, 1986	Atlanta, GA	United States	Atlanta Civic Center
August 13, 1986	Birmingham, AL	United States	Birmingham Municipal Auditorium
August 16, 1986	Chicago, IL	United States	Arie Crown Theater
August 18, 1986	Toledo, OH	United States	Masonic Auditorium
August 19, 1986	Indianapolis, IN	United States	Murat Theatre
August 21, 1986	St. Louis, MO	United States	Fox Theatre
August 22, 1986	Kansas City, MO	United States	Midland Theatre
August 23, 1986	Tulsa, OK	United States	Brady Theater
August 24, 1986	Little Rock, AR	United States	Robinson Municipal Auditorium
August 26, 1986	Houston, TX	United States	Houston Music Hall
August 27, 1986	Houston, TX	United States	Houston Music Hall
August 28, 1986	Houston, TX	United States	Houston Music Hall
September 4, 1986	Sunrise, FL	United States	Sunrise Musical Theater
September 6, 1986	New York, NY	United States	Radio City Music Hall
September 7, 1986	New York, NY	United States	Radio City Music Hall
Europe
September 14, 1986	Dublin	Ireland	Olympia Theatre
September 15, 1986	Glasgow	United Kingdom	Theatre Royal
September 17, 1986	Hamburg	West Germany	CCH Saal 3
North America
September 23, 1986	Chicago, IL	United States	Arie Crown Theater
September 24, 1986	Fort Wayne, IN	United States	Embassy Theatre
September 25, 1986	Detroit, MI	United States	State Theatre
September 26, 1986	Pittsburgh, PA	United States	Syria Mosque
September 28, 1986	Lexington, KY	United States	Singletary Center for the Arts
September 30, 1986	Chicago, IL	United States	Arie Crown Theater
October 2, 1986	Peoria, IL	United States	Civic Center Theater
October 4, 1986	Memphis, TN	United States	Orpheum Theatre
October 5, 1986	Memphis, TN	United States	Orpheum Theatre
October 6, 1986	Memphis, TN	United States	Orpheum Theatre
October 8, 1986	Chattanooga, TN	United States	Soldiers and Sailors Memorial Auditorium
October 10, 1986	Washington, DC	United States	DAR Constitution Hall
October 11, 1986	Washington, DC	United States	DAR Constitution Hall
October 21, 1986	Norfolk, VA	United States	Chrysler Hall
October 22, 1986	Richmond, VA	United States	Mosque Theater
October 23, 1986	Greensboro, NC	United States	War Memorial Auditorium
October 24, 1986	Columbia, SC	United States	Township Auditorium
October 25, 1986	Macon, GA	United States	Macon City Auditorium
October 28, 1986	Jacksonville, FL	United States	Civic Auditorium
October 29, 1986	Orlando, FL	United States	Bob Carr Performing Arts Centre
October 30, 1986	St. Petersburg, FL	United States	Mahaffey Theater
November 19, 1986	Highland Heights, OH	United States	Front Row Theater
November 20, 1986	Highland Heights, OH	United States	Front Row Theater
November 21, 1986	Chicago, IL	United States	Arie Crown Theater
November 22, 1986	Chicago, IL	United States	Arie Crown Theater
November 23, 1986	Chicago, IL	United States	Arie Crown Theater
November 25, 1986	St. Louis, MO	United States	Fox Theatre
November 26, 1986	St. Louis, MO	United States	Fox Theatre
November 28, 1986	Detroit, MI	United States	Masonic Temple Theater
November 29, 1986	Detroit, MI	United States	Masonic Temple Theater
November 30, 1986	Detroit, MI	United States	Masonic Temple Theater
December 3, 1986	Cincinnati, OH	United States	Cincinnati Music Hall
December 4, 1986	Detroit, MI	United States	Masonic Temple Theater
December 5, 1986	Detroit, MI	United States	Masonic Temple Theater
December 27, 1986	Los Angeles, CA	United States	Beverly Theatre
December 28, 1986	Los Angeles, CA	United States	Beverly Theatre
December 30, 1986	Los Angeles, CA	United States	Beverly Theatre
December 31, 1986	Los Angeles, CA	United States	Beverly Theatre
January 2, 1987	Los Angeles, CA	United States	Beverly Theatre
January 4, 1987	Los Angeles, CA	United States	Beverly Theatre
January 5, 1987	Los Angeles, CA	United States	Beverly Theatre
February 4, 1987	Oakland, CA	United States	Paramount Theatre
February 5, 1987	Oakland, CA	United States	Paramount Theatre
February 6, 1987	San Carlos, CA	United States	Circle Star Theatre
February 7, 1987	San Carlos, CA	United States	Circle Star Theatre
February 8, 1987	San Carlos, CA	United States	Circle Star Theatre
February 14, 1987	Sunrise, FL	United States	Sunrise Musical Theater
February 15, 1987	Sunrise, FL	United States	Sunrise Musical Theater
February 18, 1987	New Orleans, LA	United States	Saenger Theatre
February 20, 1987	New Orleans, LA	United States	Saenger Theatre
February 21, 1987	New Orleans, LA	United States	Saenger Theatre
February 22, 1987	Dallas, TX	United States	Dallas Convention Center Arena
March 3, 1987	Toronto, ON	Canada	O'Keefe Centre
March 5, 1987	Highland Heights, OH	United States	Front Row Theater
March 6, 1987	Highland Heights, OH	United States	Front Row Theater
March 7, 1987	Highland Heights, OH	United States	Front Row Theater
March 8, 1987	Highland Heights, OH	United States	Front Row Theater
March 19, 1987	Merrillville, IN	United States	Holiday Star Theater
March 20, 1987	Merrillville, IN	United States	Holiday Star Theater
March 21, 1987	Merrillville, IN	United States	Holiday Star Theater
March 22, 1987	Merrillville, IN	United States	Holiday Star Theater
July 17, 1987	Philadelphia, PA	United States	Mann Music Center
July 18, 1987	Columbia, MD	United States	Merriweather Post Pavilion
July 19, 1987	Atlanta, GA	United States	Chastain Park Amphitheater
July 20, 1987	Atlanta, GA	United States	Chastain Park Amphitheater
July 22, 1987	Nashville, TN	United States	Starwood Amphitheatre
July 25, 1987	Clarkston, MI	United States	Pine Knob Music Theatre
July 26, 1987	Clarkston, MI	United States	Pine Knob Music Theatre
July 28, 1987	Saratoga Springs, NY	United States	Saratoga Performing Arts Center
July 31, 1987	Holmdel, NJ	United States	Garden State Arts Center
August 1, 1987^{[C]}	Wantagh, NY	United States	Jones Beach Marine Theater
August 4, 1987	Cuyahoga Falls, OH	United States	Blossom Music Center
August 5, 1987	Cuyahoga Falls, OH	United States	Blossom Music Center
August 7, 1987	Hoffman Estates, IL	United States	Poplar Creek Music Theater
August 8, 1987	Hoffman Estates, IL	United States	Poplar Creek Music Theater
August 10, 1987	Mansfield, MA	United States	Great Woods Center for the Performing Arts
August 11, 1987	Mansfield, MA	United States	Great Woods Center for the Performing Arts
August 15, 1987	Columbia, MD	United States	Merriweather Post Pavilion
August 16, 1987	Columbia, MD	United States	Merriweather Post Pavilion
August 18, 1987	Mobile, AL	United States	Mobile Municipal Auditorium
August 19, 1987	Huntsville, AL	United States	Von Braun Civic Center
August 21, 1987	Bonner Springs, KS	United States	Sandstone Amphitheater
August 23, 1987	Tempe, AZ	United States	ASU Activity Center
August 25, 1987	Morrison, CO	United States	Red Rocks Amphitheatre
August 27, 1987	Seattle, WA	United States	Mercer Arena
August 28, 1987	Portland, OR	United States	Civic Auditorium
August 29, 1987	Portland, OR	United States	Civic Auditorium
August 31, 1987	San Carlos, CA	United States	Circle Star Theatre
September 1, 1987	San Carlos, CA	United States	Circle Star Theatre
September 3, 1987	Los Angeles, CA	United States	Greek Theatre
September 4, 1987	Los Angeles, CA	United States	Greek Theatre
September 5, 1987	Los Angeles, CA	United States	Greek Theatre
September 6, 1987	Los Angeles, CA	United States	Greek Theatre
September 9, 1987	Mountain View, CA	United States	Shoreline Amphitheatre
September 11, 1987	San Diego, CA	United States	SDSU Open Air Theatre
September 12, 1987	San Diego, CA	United States	SDSU Open Air Theatre
September 13, 1987	Irvine, CA	United States	Irvine Meadows Amphitheatre
September 17, 1987	Concord, CA	United States	Concord Pavilion
September 18, 1987	Sacramento, CA	United States	ARCO Arena
September 19, 1987	Las Vegas, NV	United States	Aladdin Theatre for the Performing Arts
October 14, 1987	New York, NY	United States	Radio City Music Hall
October 15, 1987	New York, NY	United States	Radio City Music Hall
October 16, 1987	New York, NY	United States	Radio City Music Hall
October 18, 1987	New York, NY	United States	Radio City Music Hall
October 22, 1987	Boston, MA	United States	Wang Theatre
October 23, 1987	Boston, MA	United States	Wang Theatre
October 24, 1987	Boston, MA	United States	Wang Theatre
October 25, 1987	Boston, MA	United States	Wang Theatre
October 29, 1987	Atlanta, GA	United States	Fox Theatre
October 30, 1987	Atlanta, GA	United States	Fox Theatre
October 31, 1987	Winston-Salem, NC	United States	LJVM Coliseum Annex
November 12, 1987	Detroit, MI	United States	Masonic Temple Theater
November 13, 1987	Detroit, MI	United States	Masonic Temple Theater
November 14, 1987	Pittsburgh, PA	United States	Syria Mosque
November 15, 1987	Pittsburgh, PA	United States	Syria Mosque
November 17, 1987	St. Louis, MO	United States	Fox Theatre
November 18, 1987	St. Louis, MO	United States	Fox Theatre
November 21, 1987	Washington, DC	United States	DAR Constitution Hall
November 22, 1987	Washington, DC	United States	DAR Constitution Hall
November 24, 1987	Washington, DC	United States	DAR Constitution Hall
November 25, 1987	Washington, DC	United States	DAR Constitution Hall
November 27, 1987	Merrillville, IN	United States	Holiday Star Theatre
November 28, 1987	Merrillville, IN	United States	Holiday Star Theatre
November 29, 1987	Merrillville, IN	United States	Holiday Star Theatre

Festivals and other miscellaneous performances
^{A} This concert was a part of the "JVC Jazz Festival"
^{B} This concert was a part of the "Montreux Jazz Festival"
^{C} This concert was a part of the "Miller Genuine Draft Concerts at Jones Beach"

Cancellations and rescheduled shows

July 14, 1986	Hamburg, West Germany	CCH Saal 3	Rescheduled to September 17, 1986
July 29, 1986	Glasgow, Scotland	Theatre Royal	Rescheduled to September 15, 1986
July 30, 1986	Dublin, Ireland	Olympia Theatre	Rescheduled to September 14, 1986
February 22, 1987	Dallas, Texas	Music Hall at Fair Park	Moved to the Dallas Convention Center Arena

=== Box office score data ===
Venue	City	Tickets sold / Available	Gross revenue
Meyerhoff Symphony Hall	Baltimore	5,000 / 7,500 (67%)	$104,000
Fox Theatre	St. Louis	23,304 / 23,325 (100%)	$432,128
Front Row Theatre	Highland Heights	18,785 / 18,984 (99%)	$361,553
Arie Crown Theater	Chicago	12,957 / 12,957 (100%)	$255,580
Masonic Temple Theater	Detroit	30,029 / 30,029 (100%)	$586,103
Cincinnati Music Hall	Cincinnati	3,630 / 3,630 (100%)	$61,233
Paramount Theatre	Oakland	5,600 / 5,600 (100%)	$129,000
Circle Star Theatre	San Carlos	11,100 / 11,100 (100%)	$238,000
Saenger Theatre	New Orleans	8,400 / 8,400 (100%)	$181,000
Dallas Convention Center Arena	Dallas	7,600 / 9,816 (77%)	$119,000
O'Keefe Centre	Toronto	3,059 / 3,059 (100%)	$59,848
Holiday Star Theater	Merrillville	13,344 / 13,344 (100%)	$250,460
Pine Knob Music Theatre	Clarkston	17,071 / 28,000 (61%)	$313,685
Garden State Arts Center	Holmdel Township	8,663 / 10,802 (80%)	$146,943
Jones Beach Marine Theater	Wantagh	10,226 / 10,226 (100%)	$201,460
Poplar Creek Music Theater	Hoffman Estates	13,659 / 33,878 (40%)	$236,215
Merriweather Post Pavilion	Columbia	18,754 / 26,344 (71%)	$356,723
Greek Theatre	Los Angeles	24,748 / 24,748 (100%)	$611,750
Shoreline Amphitheatre	Mountain View	7,974 / 15,000 (53%)	$154,787
SDSU Open Air Theatre	San Diego	8,331 / 8,331 (100%)	$173,055
Irvine Meadows Amphitheatre	Irvine	10,418 / 10,418 (100%)	$199,556
Concord Pavilion	Concord	7,269 / 8,110 (90%)	$126,270
ARCO Arena	Sacramento	4,888 / 5,000 (98%)	$85,557
Aladdin Theatre for the Performing Arts	Las Vegas	7,000 / 7,000 (100%)	$142,156
Wang Theatre	Boston	16,254 / 16,254 (100%)	$394,672
Fox Theatre	Atlanta	8,638 / 8,638 (100%)	$216,573
Syria Mosque Theater	Pittsburgh	7,200 / 7,200 (100%)	$162,000
DAR Constitution Hall	Washington, D.C.	14,541 / 14,984 (97%)	$353,750
TOTAL		328,442 / 382,677 (86%)	$6,653,057

== VHS/DVD/CD release ==
A Night of Rapture: Live

Live album by Anita Baker
- Released: June 8, 2004
- Recorded: 2004
- Genres: R&B; smooth jazz
- Label: Rhino
- Producer: George Duke

Anita Baker chronology
The Best of Anita Baker (2002)	A Night of Rapture: Live (2004)	My Everything (2004)

Professional ratings
Review scores
Source	Rating
AllMusic	2/5 stars

A DVD and CD live collection, entitled A Night of Rapture: Live was released in 2004 by Rhino Records, which reached #35 in the Billboard 'Top R&B/Hip-Hop albums' list.

=== Track listing ===
1. Caught Up in the Rapture – 5:29
2. Mystery – 5:24
3. Been So Long – 5:52
4. No One in the World – 4:11
5. Same Ole Love (365 Days a Year) – 3:59
6. Watch Your Step – 6:20
7. Moondance – 4:08
8. You Bring Me Joy – 4:32
9. Sweet Love – 7:20
10. Sweet Love [Multimedia Track]
11. You Bring Me Joy [Multimedia Track]
12. No One in the World [Multimedia Track]
