= How Does It Feel =

How Does It Feel may refer to:

== Music ==
=== Albums ===
- How Does It Feel, a 1999 album by Nancy Sinatra
- How Does It Feel (album) by MS MR

=== Songs ===
- "How Does It Feel" (Anita Baker song)
- "How Does It Feel" (Slade song)
- "How Does It Feel (Chlöe song)"
- "How Does It Feel (to be the mother of 1000 dead)?", a controversial song by Crass
- "How Does It Feel", a song by Avril Lavigne from Under My Skin
- "How Does It Feel", a song by Candlebox from Into the Sun
- "How Does It Feel", a song by Keri Hilson from In a Perfect World...
- "How Does It Feel", a song by London Grammar from Californian Soil
- "How Does It Feel", a song by Men Without Hats from No Hats Beyond This Point
- "How Does It Feel", a song by M-22
- "How Does It Feel?", a song by Pharrell Williams from In My Mind
- "How Does It Feel?", a song by The Ronettes from Presenting the Fabulous Ronettes Featuring Veronica
- "How Does It Feel", a song by Toto from Isolation
- "How Does It Feel", a song by Westlife from Unbreakable – The Greatest Hits Vol. 1
- "How Does It Feel (Tom Grennan song)" a 2023 song from What Ifs & Maybes
- "Untitled (How Does It Feel)", a song by D'Angelo from Voodoo
- "Like a Rolling Stone", song by Bob Dylan from Highway 61 Revisited, known for the line "How does it feel?"
- "Blue Monday" (New Order song), a song whose first line is "How does it feel"
