= Chapter 8 (band) =

Band

- Origin: Detroit, Michigan
- Genres: Soul
- Years active: 1970s-1980s
- Labels: Ariola; Beverly Glen; Capitol
- Members: Derek Dirckson; Michael J.Powell; Gerald Lyles; David Washington; Van Cephus; Gary Bubash; Courtlen Hale; Scott Guthre; Alan Nance; Valerie Pinkston
- Past members: Anita Baker; Vernon Fails; Martin V. Stuart

Chapter 8 was an American soul music group of the 1970s and 1980s formed by Derek Dirckson, Michael J. Powell and David Washington. Anita Baker was featured as lead vocalist on their first, self-titled album on Ariola in 1979, produced by Michael and Derek.

== History ==
The group was started in Detroit in the late 1970s. Derek Dirckson became the band leader after James Mitchell asked Derek to play drums with Chapter 8, who were at the time the backup Band for the Detroit Emeralds. In 1979, Dirckson and Michael J. Powell produced the first album expanding the groups roster to include Anita Baker, Gerald Lyles, David Washington, Van Cephus, Courtlen Hale, Scott Guthre, and Allen Nance. In 1985, Valerie Pinkston replaced Baker as the lead vocalist and was featured on "This Love's For Real"

As Chapter 8 was the launching pad for Baker, so was it for Michael J. Powell who went on to produce Baker's Rapture, Giving You The Best That I Got, and Compositions albums. Many of the Chapter 8 group members can be found performing on these 1980s recording masterpieces.

Ariola was merged with the Bertelsmann Music Group (the same company that owned Arista Records, the longtime home of Baker's main rival Whitney Houston) in 1987, and Baker would end a ten-year hiatus in 2004, when she released "My Everything" under Capitol's Blue Note Records sub-label.

Derek Dirckson went on to discover, manage, and produce Fred Hammond, Commissioned, The Winans, John P. Kee, Mary Mary, and the great gospel plays, "Momma Don't", "Wicked", "Come Out of The Rain", and many more. In 1999, Dirckson opened the Blackstage Pass Recording Studio in Detroit, Michigan. Dirckson recorded his first solo CD entitled Dirckson, featuring Evangelist Ella Worthington and Minister Noah I. Brown on lead vocals.

== Discography ==
=== Extended plays ===
- 1979: Chapter 8 (EP, Ariola)
- 1985: This Love's For Real (Beverly Glen Records)
- 1988: Forever (Capitol Records)
