= You're My Everything (Anita Baker song) =

Single by Anita Baker

from the album My Everything
- B-side: "Close Your Eyes"
- Released: 2004
- Recorded: 2003, 2004
- Genre: Soul; soul jazz
- Length: 3:36
- Label: Blue Note
- Songwriter(s): Anita Baker, C. Boone; E. Ridgeway, C. Ridgeway
- Producer(s): Barry J. Eastmond

Anita Baker singles chronology
"It's Been You" (1995)	"You're My Everything" (2004)	"How Does It Feel" (2004)

"You're My Everything" is a 2004 song by American recording artist Anita Baker. The song was released as the lead single in support of her hit album, My Everything.

== Chart performance ==
Anita Baker's single, "You're My Everything" peaked at number 25 on Billboard's Hot R&B/Hip-Hop Songs, Baker's first top 40 since 1995's "It's Been You" from her Rhythm of Love album.

== Track listing ==
Europe CD Single", Single CD

No.	Title	Length
1.	"You're My Everything" (Radio Edit)	3:36
2.	"Close Your Eyes" (Album Version)	4:42

== Charts ==
=== Weekly charts ===
Chart (2004)	Peak position
US Billboard Hot 100	74
US Adult Contemporary (Billboard)	40
US Hot R&B/Hip-Hop Songs (Billboard)	25

=== Year-end charts ===
Chart (2004)	Position
US Hot R&B/Hip-Hop Songs (Billboard)	84
