= How Does It Feel (Anita Baker song) =

Single by Anita Baker

from the album My Everything
- Released: 2004
- Recorded: 2003, 2004
- Genre: R&B; soul; soul jazz
- Length: 4:00 (Radio Edit)
- Label: Blue Note
- Songwriter(s): Anita Baker; Barry J. Eastmond
- Producer(s): Barry J. Eastmond

Anita Baker singles chronology
"You're My Everything" (2004)	"How Does It Feel" (2004)	"Serious" (2004)

"How Does It Feel" is a song by American recording artist Anita Baker. The song was released as a second single from her My Everything album. "How Does It Feel" peaked #41 on Billboard's R&B/Hip-Hop Singles.

== Charts ==
Chart (2004)	Peak position
US Hot R&B/Hip-Hop Songs	41
