= Perri (group) =

American R&B vocal sister group from Bakersfield, California

- Origin: Bakersfield, California, U.S.
- Genres: R&B; soul; gospel; jazz
- Instrument: Vocals
- Years active: 1981–present
- Labels: Zebra / MCA; Geffen; Perri
- Members: Carol Perry; Darlene Perry; Sharon Perry; Lori Perry
- Website: perrylanemusic.com

Perri is an American R&B vocal group composed of a quartet of sisters. Throughout their career, they have had a career their own releasing albums and had a career as session singers.

== History ==
The group composed of four sisters, Carol, Darlene, Sharon, and Lori, based in Bakersfield, California. In 1981, their career began after seeing a Pat Metheny concert. They sent him a demo tape and they backed him on a record by him. They toured with him from 1983 until 1985. At this time, the group moved to Los Angeles. In 1986, Anita Baker recruited the group to a concert in Los Angeles for her Rapture Tour. In that same year, they secured a record deal with Zebra/MCA, where their debut album, Celebrate, was released. The album peaked at No. 48 in December 1986 on the Top Jazz Albums chart. The album drew inspiration from Metheny's jazz standards. In 1988, they provided backing vocals for Baker's album Giving You the Best That I Got. Their single, Feels So Good, was featured on the movie Do the Right Thing. In 1990, their album, Tradewinds, was released through Geffen Records. The album peaked at No. 30 on the Top R&B/Hip Hop Albums chart. In the following year, Ebony Magazine listed the album on the "Also Recommended" list of albums. In 1995, they sung at Holly Robinson Peete and Rodney Peete's wedding. In the following year, they contributed to Ann Nesby's solo debut.

Throughout their career, they have also contributed background on records from musical artists such as Kendrick Lamar, Snoop Dogg, Herbie Hancock, Kirk Franklin, Tamela Mann, and TobyMac. They also appeared on CDs by musical artists such as Whitney Houston, Patti LaBelle, and Brenda Russell. They appeared on Houston's record, The Star Spangled Banner, on the B-side, "America the Beautiful", and was credited.

In 2016, their first album in 26 years, Back to You, was released, on their own label.

== Discography ==
Celebrate (1986, Zebra/MCA)

1. "Jaco Two" (4:20)
2. "Maybe Tomorrow" (4:56)
3. "Alone" (7:12)
4. "Celebrate!" (7:25)
5. "You Take Me to Heaven" (4:32)
6. "Airsteam Two" (6:03)
7. "Say (You'll Be Mine)" (4:31)
8. "He Never Sleeps" (3:02)

The Flight (1988, Zebra/MCA)

1. "I'm the One" (4:37)
2. "Upside Down" (4:37)
3. "No Place to Go" (4:26)
4. "Fall in Love" (4:42)
5. "Flight" (5:05)
6. "I Don't Wanna Lose Your Love" (5:00)
7. "Travels Two" (5:04)
8. "Caves of Altamira" (4:15)
9. "Eternal Life" (3:20)

Tradewinds (1990, Geffen)

1. "Someone Like You" (5:04)
2. "It's Been You" (4:40)
3. "You Taught Me How" (4:32)
4. "Tradewinds" (5:20)
5. "Talk to Me" (4:14)
6. "You're the One" (5:39)
7. "Crazy" (3:01)
8. "Mary, Mary" (5:08)
9. "No Way to Treat a Lady" (4:24)
10. "Say You Will" (3:43)

Back to You (2016, Perri Records)

1. "Majesty" (5:25)
2. "Jesus He Is Worthy" (4:05)
3. "Back to You" (5:18)
4. "God is So Good" (4:48)
5. "You Are Holy" (6:23)
6. "Sing Unto the Lord" (4:52)
7. "We Got to Pray" (4:38)
8. "Call it Grace" (4:31)
9. "Walk Like You" (5:51)
10. "Use Me" (3:09)
