= Chapter 8 (Chapter 8 album) =

Studio album by Chapter 8
- Released: 1979
- Recorded: 1979
- Genre: Soul
- Length: 36:43
- Label: Ariola
- Producer: Derek Dirckson and Michael J. Powell

Chapter 8 chronology
| Chapter 8 (1979) | This Love's for Real (1985) |

Professional ratings
Review scores
| Source | Rating |
|---|---|
| AllMusic | 3/5 stars |

Chapter 8 is the debut studio album by the Detroit, Michigan-based group Chapter 8. It was released in 1979. It was their only album to include lead vocals from Anita Baker before she went on to solo stardom. The album for the company that was little noticed, except for the Baker-led minor hit single "Ready for Your Love". The single, written by David Washington, prefigured Baker's solo career in a duet with bandmate Gerald Lyles, backed by Derek Dirckson on drums Michael Powell on guitar and Courtten Hale on saxophone.

== Track listing ==
1. "Don't You Like It" - (Michael J. Powell) 4:46
2. "Ready for Your Love" - (David Washington) 4:34
3. "Come On Dance With Me" - (Derek Dirckson) 3:43
4. "We Need Love" - (Powell) 5:46
5. "I Go Disco" - (Dirckson) 5:15
6. "I Just Wanna Be Your Girl" - (Powell) 5:07
7. "Come And Boogie" - (Powell, Washington) 3:54
8. "Let's Get Together" - (Powell) 3:38

== Charts ==
| Chart (1979) | Peak position |
|---|---|
| Billboard Top LPs & Tape | 132 |
| Top Soul LPs (Billboard) | 40 |

=== Singles ===
| Year | Single | US R&B |
|---|---|---|
| 1979 | "I Just Wanna Be Your Girl" | 81 |
| 1979 | "Ready for Your Love" | 38 |
| 1980 | "Don't You Like It" | 55 |

"Ready for Your Love" was Chapter 8's first hit on the R&B chart in the United States. The hit single, written by bassist David Washington, is mainly remembered for prefiguring the solo career of Anita Baker in a duet with bandmate Gerald Lyles, backed by Michael Powell on guitar and Courtten Hale on sax.
