= I Apologize (Anita Baker song) =

1994 single by Anita Baker

Single by Anita Baker

from the album Rhythm of Love
- B-side: "Baby"; "Caught Up in the Rapture"
- Released: October 1994
- Genre: R&B; soul jazz
- Length: 5:12 (album version); 4:16 (single version)
- Label: Elektra
- Songwriters: Anita Baker; Gordon Chambers; Barry J. Eastmond
- Producer: Barry J. Eastmond

Anita Baker singles chronology
"Body and Soul" (1994)	"I Apologize" (1994)	"It's Been You" (1995)

"I Apologize" is a song by American recording artist Anita Baker, released in October 1994, by Elektra Records, as the second single from her fifth album, Rhythm of Love (1994). The song peaked at number eight on the US Billboard Hot R&B Singles chart and number 74 on the Billboard Hot 100. It won her a Grammy Award for Best Female R&B Vocal Performance.

== Release and critical reception ==
"I Apologize" entered Billboard's Hot R&B Airplay chart on November 5, 1994, and rose up to number 5 at the end of February 1995. The song hit number 1 on Billboard's Adult R&B Airplay chart on February 4, 1995, spending 38 weeks on the chart. At the same time, the song peaked at number 8 on the R&B chart. In the UK, "I Apologize" broke into the pop singles chart at number 80 on July 2, 1995, and dropped out the next week.

British magazine Music Week gave the song three out of five, writing, "Baker goes jungle? But her strong vocals retain the original feel of these tracks, creating a soulful jungle splice-up." Chuck Campbell from Knoxville News Sentinel felt that here, the singer "glides into the subtlety of a more refined arrangement". Jonathan Bernstein from Spin named it "a request-line perennial-in-the-making".

== Charts ==
=== Weekly charts ===
Chart (1994–1995)	Peak position
UK Singles (OCC)	80
US Billboard Hot 100	74
US Hot R&B/Hip-Hop Songs (Billboard)	8
US Cash Box Top 100	72

=== Year-end charts ===
Chart (1995)	Position
US Hot R&B/Hip-Hop Songs (Billboard)	24
