= My Everything (Anita Baker album) =

Studio album by Anita Baker
- Released: September 7, 2004
- Recorded: 2003–2004
- Studios: Soup Can Studio (Detroit, Michigan); East Bay Music Studios (Tarrytown, New York); Conway Studios, Brandon's Way and Le Gonks West Studios (Hollywood, California); The Village Recorder (Los Angeles, California); Record One (Sherman Oaks, California)
- Genres: R&B, soul
- Length: 44:27
- Label: Blue Note
- Producers: Barry J. Eastmond; Babyface; Anita Baker

Anita Baker chronology
The Best of Anita Baker (2002)	My Everything (2004)	Christmas Fantasy (2005)

Singles from My Everything
- 1. "You're My Everything" Released: 2004; 2. "How Does It Feel" Released: 2004

My Everything is the sixth studio album by American singer Anita Baker. It was released by Blue Note Records on September 7, 2004, in the United States. It was Baker's first album for the label and her first album of new material in ten years. For her comeback album, Baker wanted to be "in control" of everything, and once again teamed up with Barry J. Eastmond and George Duke. Kenneth "Babyface" Edmonds also contributed. Baker wrote or co-wrote eight of the album's ten tracks. The last track, "Men in My Life" was written for her then-husband and two sons.

The album debuted at number four on the US Billboard 200 and reached the top of the Top R&B/Hip-Hop Albums chart, selling 132,000 copies in its first week. By May 2005, the album had sold 568,000 copies in the US and been certified Gold by the Recording Industry Association of America (RIAA).

== Critical reception ==
Professional ratings
Review scores
Source	Rating
Allmusic	4/5 stars
Blender	3/5 stars
Entertainment Weekly	B

According to the review aggregator Metacritic, My Everything received "generally favorable reviews" based on a weighted average score of 67 out of 100 from 8 critic scores. AllMusic editor Thom Jurek wrote that "some may be frustrated that, after such a long time, Baker doesn't push the envelope more stylistically. This may be true in terms of the material itself, but that's not necessarily a bad thing. Right down the line, Baker delivers on what she does best [...]. This is a worthy return, qualitatively standing head and shoulders above most everything else in its class." Beth Johnson, writing for Entertainment Weekly, remarked that "Baker picks up where she left off in '94. Granted, there isn't a monster hit on My Everything on par with her R&B; classics like "Sweet Love," but in these say-anything times it's next to revolutionary that she can whip her warm, luxurious voice into take-me-now passion while keeping it entirely."

== Track listing ==
No.	Title	Writer(s)	Producer(s)	Length
1.	"You're My Everything"	Anita Baker; Curtiss Boone; Esther Ridgeway; Gloria Ridgeway; Gracie Ridgeway	Barry J. Eastmond	5:03
2.	"How Could You"	Baker; Eastmond	Eastmond	4:21
3.	"In My Heart"	Baker; Eastmond	Eastmond	5:06
4.	"Serious"	Dawn Thomas	Eastmond	5:25
5.	"How Does It Feel"	Baker; Eastmond	Eastmond	4:24
6.	"Like You Used to Do"	Baker; Eastmond; Kenneth Edmonds	Babyface	5:11
7.	"Close Your Eyes"	Baker; Eastmond	Eastmond	4:42
8.	"You're My Everything" (Revisited)	Baker; Boone; E. Ridgeway; G. Ridgeway; Ridgeway	Eastmond	1:12
9.	"I Can't Sleep"	Baker; Jimmy Haslip; Russell Ferrante; Lori Perry; William Kennedy	Eastmond	5:08
10.	"Men in My Life"	Baker	Baker	3:44

== Personnel and credits ==
Musicians

- Anita Baker – vocals, backing vocals
- Barry J. Eastmond – all keyboards, percussion, backing vocals
- George Duke – additional synthesizers, percussion
- Leo Colon – additional synthesizers
- Eric Rehl – additional synthesizers
- Russell Ferrante – acoustic piano (9)
- Babyface – guitars, backing vocals
- Phil Hamilton – guitars
- Paul Jackson Jr. – guitars
- Robert Randolph – guitars
- Gerald Albright – bass
- Alex Al – bass
- Nathan East – bass
- Reggie Hamilton – bass
- Jimmy Haslip – bass
- Ron Jenkins – bass
- Al Turner – bass
- Bernard Davis – drums
- Steve Ferrone – drums
- Will Kennedy – drums
- Ricky Lawson – drums
- Bashiri Johnson – percussion
- Rafael Padilla – percussion (6)
- Gary Bias – tenor saxophone (1, 9)
- Dan Higgins – baritone saxophone (1, 9), tenor saxophone (1, 9)
- Eric Marienthal – alto sax solo (9)
- Reggie Young – trombone (1, 9)
- Gary Grant – trumpet (1, 9)
- Jerry Hey – trumpet (1, 9)
- The Ridgeway Sisters – backing vocals (1)
- Gordon Chambers – backing vocals
- Perri – backing vocals
- Kenya Ivey – backing vocals (6)

Music arrangements

- Anita Baker – arrangements (1–5, 7–10)
- Barry J. Eastmond – arrangements (1–5, 7–10), horn arrangements (1, 9)
- Jerry Hey – horn arrangements (1, 9)
- The Ridgeway Sisters – BGV arrangement (1)
- Babyface – arrangements (6)
- Russell Ferrante – arrangements (9)

Production

- Anita Baker – executive producer, wardrobe
- Maria Eastmond – production coordinator
- Shaneika D. Brooks – project manager
- Gordon H. Gee – creative director
- Greenberg Kingsley – design
- Andrew Eccles – photography
- Q – hair
- Reggie Wells – make-up
- Evan Ross – wardrobe

Technical credits

- Anita Baker – engineer (1–5, 7–10)
- Dylan Dresdow – engineer (1–5, 7–10)
- Barry J. Eastmond – engineer (1–5, 7–10)
- Allen Sides – engineer (1–5, 7–10)
- Kevin Syzmanski – engineer (1–5, 7–10), assistant engineer (1–5, 7–10)
- Ghian Wright – engineer (1–5, 7–10)
- George Duke – mixing (1–5, 7–10)
- Erik Zobler – mixing (1–5, 7–10)
- Paul Boutin – recording (6)
- Jon Gass – mixing (6)
- Greg Burns – assistant engineer (1–5, 7–10)
- Jared Nugent – assistant engineer (1–5, 7–10)
- Tom Wilber – assistant engineer (1–5, 7–10)
- Stefaniah McGowan – mix assistant (1–5, 7–10)
- Edward Quesada – mix assistant (6)

== Charts ==
=== Weekly charts ===
Chart (2004)	Peak position
Canadian Albums (Nielsen SoundScan)	85
Canadian R&B Albums (Nielsen SoundScan)	22
Dutch Albums (Album Top 100)	89
Italian Albums (FIMI)	29
US Billboard 200	4
US Top R&B/Hip-Hop Albums (Billboard)	1

=== Year-end charts ===
Chart (2004)	Position
US Billboard 200	179
US Top R&B/Hip-Hop Albums (Billboard)	50

== Certifications ==
Region	Certification	Certified units/sales
United States (RIAA)	Gold	500,000^{^}
^{^} Shipments figures based on certification alone.

== See also ==
- List of Billboard number-one R&B/hip-hop albums of 2004
