= Christmas Fantasy =

Studio album by Anita Baker
- Released: October 4, 2005
- Studios: Capitol Studios (Hollywood, California); The Village Recorder (Los Angeles, California); East Bay Studios (Tarrytown, New York); Avatar Studios (New York City, New York)
- Genres: Jazz; R&B; Christmas
- Length: 44:59
- Label: Blue Note
- Producers: Barry Eastmond; Anita Baker

Anita Baker chronology
My Everything (2004)	Christmas Fantasy (2005)

Christmas Fantasy is the seventh studio album by American singer Anita Baker. It was released on October 4, 2005, by Blue Note Records. Her first and only Christmas album, it was produced by Baker along with Barry Eastmond, featuring three original songs and six cover versions of Christmas standards and carols. Christmas Fantasy peaked at number 120 on the US Billboard 200, and number 17 on the Top Holiday Albums and remains her last album to date.

== Background ==
Christmas Fantasy was recorded in the summer of 2005. For the album, Baker performed several classic Christmas songs such as "I'll Be Home for Christmas", "O Come All Ye Faithful", "God Rest Ye Merry Gentlemen", and "Christmas Time Is Here". She also recorded "Frosty's Rag", a re-imagined version of "Frosty the Snowman", a rendition of the Broadway Holiday song "My Favorite Things" and three original compositions, including "Moonlight Sleighride", "Family of Man" and "Christmas Fantasy".

== Critical reception ==
Professional ratings
Review scores
Source	Rating
AllMusic	3.5/5 stars
Gigwise	1/5 stars
The Guardian	4/5 stars

Caroline Sullivan, writing for The Guardian, found that Baker's "first Christmas album is exactly the ticket for that pre-coma moment late on December 25, when all you can face is something cool and easily digestible." She concluded: "With not an ounce of filler, you might even want to listen to it again, come January." AllMusic editor David Jeffries remarked that "there are only nine tracks on Baker's Christmas Fantasy, but the album still clocks in at 45 minutes, with most tracks letting things comfortably develop past the five-minute mark. Part of the reason for this is the band. With George Duke, Larry Carlton, Joe Sample, the underrated Ricky Lawson, and other top-notch folk involved, it would be a shame not to let these boys play, but as much as they get to vamp, it's still Baker's album, 100 percent." Paul Robinson from Gigwise wrote: "Ready to cash in, Anita and her ‘unknown’ collaborators provide what any Christmas CD provides while tucking into your turkey… ambience!!"

== Commercial performance ==
Released on October 4, 2005, by Blue Note Records, Christmas Fantasy peaked at number 120 on the US Billboard 200. It also reached number 31 on Billboard's Top R&B/Hip-Hop Albums and number 17 on the Top Holiday Albums.

== Track listing ==
All tracks produced by Anita Baker and Barry J. Eastmond.

Christmas Fantasy track listing
No.	Title	Writer(s)	Length
1.	"Frosty's Rag (Frosty the Snowman)"	Jack Rollins; Steve Nelson	2:10
2.	"Christmas Time Is Here"	Lee Mendelson; Vince Guaraldi	4:38
3.	"I'll Be Home for Christmas"	Buck Ram; Kim Gannon; Walter Kent	5:24
4.	"Christmas Fantasy"	Anita Baker; Barry J. Eastmond	4:34
5.	"God Rest Ye Merry, Gentlemen"	Traditional	4:53
6.	"Moonlight Sleighride"	Baker; Eastmond	6:15
7.	"O Come, All Ye Faithful" (with The Yellowjackets)	Traditional	5:38
8.	"Family of Man"	Baker; Eastmond; Carol Ricketts; Tiffany Palmer	4:49
9.	"My Favorite Things"	Richard Rodgers; Oscar Hammerstein II	5:02
Total length:			44:59

== Personnel ==
Performers and musicians

- Anita Baker – vocals
- George Duke – acoustic piano (1, 3)
- Joe Sample – acoustic piano (2, 6, 8, 9)
- Barry J. Eastmond – Rhodes electric piano (2, 6, 9), keyboards (3, 4, 7, 8), acoustic piano (5)
- Russell Ferrante – acoustic piano (7)
- Larry Carlton – guitars (1–3, 8, 9)
- Tim May – guitars (5)
- Phil Upchurch – guitars (5)
- Nathan East – bass (1, 3, 4, 6, 8), acoustic bass (2, 9)
- Reggie Hamilton – acoustic bass (5)
- Jimmy Haslip – bass (7)
- Ricky Lawson – drums (1–6, 8, 9)
- Marcus Baylor – drums (7)
- Rafael Padilla – percussion (3, 7)
- Gene Lobianco – clarinet (1)
- Sharon Bryant – backing vocals (8)
- Tiffany Palmer – backing vocals (8)
- Carol Ricketts – backing vocals (8)

Production

- Eli Wolf – A&R
- Anita Baker – executive producer, producer
- Barry J. Eastmond – producer
- Shanieka D. Brooks – product manager
- Gordon H. Lee – art direction, design
- Adrian Buckmaster – photography

Technical credits

- Robert Hadley – mastering
- Doug Sax – mastering
- The Mastering Lab (Hollywood, California) – mastering location
- Barry J. Eastmond – engineer
- Al Schmitt – engineer, mixing (1–7)
- Bill Smith – engineer
- Michael O'Reilly – mixing (8, 9)
- Steve Genewick – assistant engineer, mix assistant (1–7)
- Jason Wormer – assistant engineer
- Peter Doris – mix assistant (8, 9)

== Charts ==
Chart performance for Christmas Fantasy
Chart (2005)	Peak position
US Billboard 200	120
US Top R&B/Hip-Hop Albums (Billboard)	31
US Top Holiday Albums (Billboard)	17
