= Rhythm of Love (Anita Baker album) =

Studio album by Anita Baker
- Released: August 23, 1994
- Recorded: 1993–1994
- Studios: The Hit Factory, Electric Lady Studios, The Power Station, Unique Recording Studios, Skyline Studios, Clinton Recording Studios, Soundtrack Studios and Greene Street Studios (New York City, New York); East Bay Studios (Tarrytown, New York); Pearl Sound Studios and Studio A (Detroit, Michigan); Ambiance Recorders (Farmington Hills, Michigan); Bill Schnee Studios (North Hollywood, California; Conway Studios (Hollywood, California
- Genres: R&B; soul jazz; smooth jazz
- Length: 61:20
- Label: Elektra
- Producers: Anita Baker; Tommy LiPuma; Gerard Smerek; Barry J. Eastmond; Arif Mardin; Michael Bradford

Anita Baker chronology
Compositions (1990)	Rhythm of Love (1994)	The Best of Anita Baker (2002)

Singles from Rhythm of Love
- 1. "Body and Soul" Released: August 1994; 2. "I Apologize" Released: October 1994; 3. "It's Been You" Released: March 1995; 4. "You Belong to Me" Released: 1995; 5. "My Funny Valentine" Released: 1995

Professional ratings
Initial reviews (in 1994)
Review scores
Source	Rating
Cash Box	(favorable)
Chicago Reader	(favorable)
Robert Christgau	(dud)
Entertainment Weekly	A−
The Guardian	(favorable)
Knoxville News Sentinel	4/5 stars
Music Week	3/5 stars
NME	3/10
Rolling Stone	4/5 stars
Spin	(favorable)

Professional ratings
Retrospective reviews (after 1994)
Review scores
Source	Rating
AllMusic	3/5 stars
Encyclopedia of Popular Music	2/5 stars

Rhythm of Love is the fifth album by American R&B/soul singer Anita Baker, released in 1994. The album peaked at #3 on the U.S. Billboard 200 and #1 on the Billboard Top R&B/Hip Hop chart and was certified double platinum, giving Baker her fourth platinum selling album.

This is the first album since 1983's The Songstress by Baker not to be produced by longtime collaborator Michael J. Powell, who had agreed to split the arrangement after the release of Baker's 1990 album, Compositions. The album's first single, "Body and Soul", gave Baker her first top 40 hit since 1989. "You Belong to Me" is a re-recording of a cover of the Carly Simon-popularized Doobie Brothers song of which she first recorded for the 1990 compilation album Rubáiyát: Elektra's 40th Anniversary, not to be confused with the song of the same title that Baker recorded for her 1988 album Giving You the Best That I Got.

Baker also received a Grammy Award in 1995 for Best Female R&B Vocal Performance for "I Apologize". "Body and Soul" was nominated for 1995 Grammy Awards for Best Female R&B Vocal Performance and Best R&B Song, and Rhythm of Love was nominated for Best R&B Album.

Rhythm of Love is Baker's last album for Elektra Records. Because of dissatisfaction with the album's promotion, Baker filed a lawsuit against Elektra, requesting a transfer to another label within Warner Music Group. Finally she signed with Atlantic Records in September 1996.

== Track listing ==
1. "Rhythm of Love" (Anita Baker, Patrick Moten) - 5:50
2. "The Look of Love" (Burt Bacharach, Hal David) - 4:47
3. "Body and Soul" (Rick Nowels, Ellen Shipley) - 5:42
4. "Baby" (Baker) - 4:25
5. "I Apologize" (Baker, Barry J. Eastmond, Gordon Chambers) - 5:09
6. "Plenty of Room" (Baker) - 4:57
7. "It's Been You" (Sami McKinney, Michael O'Hara, Mary Unobsky) - 4:59
8. "You Belong to Me" (Carly Simon, Michael McDonald) - 4:41
9. "Wrong Man" (Baker) - 5:51
10. "Only for a While" (Dawn Thomas) - 5:16
11. "Sometimes I Wonder Why" (Mike Reid, Mack David) - 4:37
12. "My Funny Valentine" (Richard Rodgers, Lorenz Hart) - 5:06

== Personnel ==
Musicians

- Anita Baker – lead vocals, backing vocals (1, 3, 4, 6–10), acoustic piano intro (1), synth percussion (1)
- Michael Bradford – acoustic piano intro (1), synthesizer programming (1)
- Barry J. Eastmond – acoustic piano (1, 3–5, 7), Rhodes electric piano (1, 3), synth bass (1), strings (1, 3), keyboards (5, 6), drum programming (5), synthesizers (7), synth solo (9), string pads (9)
- George Duke – additional percussion (1), percussion (3, 4, 6, 12), synth strings (6), electronic drums (6), Synclavier programming (woodwinds, bass, drums) (12), acoustic piano (12), Yamaha TX816 Rhodes (12), synth solo (12)
- Joe Mardin – keyboards (2, 10), programming (2, 10), cymbals (8), hi-hats (8), drums (11), strings and woodwinds (11)
- Joe Sample – acoustic piano (2, 11)
- Eddie Howard – acoustic piano solo (3)
- Luis Resto – Rhodes electric piano (4), vamp piano (4), synth pads (4), synth bass (4), acoustic piano (9), Ensoniq synthesizers (9), bass (9), drum and percussion programming (9)
- Jason Miles – synthesizer programming (6)
- Sammy Merendino – synthesizers (7), programming (7)
- Robbie Kondor – keyboards (8), programming (8)
- Greg Phillinganes – acoustic piano (10)
- Michael Thompson – rhythm guitar (1)
- Dean Parks – guitars (2, 3, 10)
- Paul Peterson – guitars (2), rhythm guitar (10)
- Steve Bargonetti – guitars (6)
- Ira Siegel – guitars (6, 7), guitar solo (7)
- Georg Wadenius – guitars (7)
- John McCurry – guitars (8)
- Bucky Pizzarelli – guitars (11)
- Paul Jackson Jr. – guitars (12)
- Nathan East – bass (3, 4)
- James Genus – bass (6)
- Anthony Jackson – bass (7, 8)
- Charnett Moffett – bass (11)
- Steve Ferrone – drums (1, 3, 4)
- Bernard Davis – drums (6)
- Bashiri Johnson – percussion (1)
- Steve Thornton – percussion (7)
- Andy Snitzer – saxophone (8)
- Everette Harp – alto saxophone (12)
- Dan Higgins – baritone saxophone (12), tenor saxophone (12)
- Reggie Young – trombone (12)
- Jerry Hey – trumpet (12)
- Gordon Chambers – backing vocals (5)

Music arrangements

- Anita Baker – arrangements (1–4, 6, 7, 9, 11), vocal arrangements (2, 5, 12), BGV arrangements (8)
- Patrick Moten – arrangements (1)
- Joe Mardin – arrangements (2, 10, 11)
- Barry J. Eastmond – string arrangements (3), arrangements (5, 7)
- Gordon Chambers – BGV arrangements (5)
- Luis Resto – arrangements (9)
- George Duke – arrangements (12)

== Production ==
- Anita Baker – executive producer, producer (1, 3, 6, 9)
- Tommy LiPuma – producer (2, 10, 11)
- Gerard Smerek – producer (4)
- Barry J. Eastmond – producer (5, 7)
- Arif Mardin – producer (8)
- George Duke – producer (12)
- Michael Bradford – Additional Production (1)
- Deborah Silverman-Kerr – project coordinator
- Charilyn Suriano – project coordinator
- Robin Smyth – art direction, design
- Kip Lott – cover and booklet photography
- Harry Langdon – additional pages booklet photography
- Frank W. Ockenfels III – additional booklet photography
- BNB Associates, Ltd. – management

Technical credits

- Doug Sax – mastering at The Mastering Lab (Hollywood, California)
- Al Schmitt – engineer (1, 3), mixing (2, 10)
- Gerard Smerek – engineer (1–4, 6, 7, 9, 10), mixing (1, 3–7, 11), lead vocal recording (1–12), lead vocal and piano recording (2, 11)
- George Duke – mixing (1, 3–6, 11, 12)
- Erik Zobler – mixing (1, 3–6, 11, 12), engineer (12)
- Randy Poole – engineer (2, 10)
- Michael O'Reilly – additional engineer (3, 10), engineer (8, 11), mixing (8)
- Earl Cohen – additional engineer (3, 6), engineer (5, 7), assistant engineer
- Chris Albert – assistant engineer
- Ian Craigie – assistant engineer
- Carl Glanville – assistant engineer
- Andy Grassi – assistant engineer
- John Hendrickson – assistant engineer
- David Kutch – assistant engineer
- John Mabilia – assistant engineer
- Carl Robinson – assistant engineer

== Charts ==
=== Weekly charts ===
Chart (1994)	Peak position
Australia (ARIA)	128
Dutch Albums (Album Top 100)	42
European Albums (Music & Media)	50
New Zealand Albums (RMNZ)	26
Scottish Albums (Official Charts)	76
Swedish Albums (Sverigetopplistan)	33
UK Albums (Official Charts)	14
US Billboard 200	3
US Top R&B/Hip-Hop Albums (Billboard)	1

=== Year-end charts ===
Chart (1994)	Position
US Billboard 200	75
US Top R&B/Hip-Hop Albums (Billboard)	16

Chart (1995)	Position
US Billboard 200	80
US Top R&B/Hip-Hop Albums (Billboard)	20

== Certifications ==
Region	Certification	Certified units/sales
United States (RIAA)	2× Platinum	2,000,000^{^}
^{^} Shipments figures based on certification alone.

== See also ==
- List of Billboard number-one R&B albums of 1994
