= Star Plaza Theatre =

Former music venue in Indiana, United States

Coordinates: 41.473442°N 87.329116°W

- Interactive map of Star Plaza Theatre
- Former names: Holiday Star Theatre (1979-90)
- Address: 8001 Delaware Pl; Merrillville, IN 46410-5641
- Location: Chicago metropolitan area
- Owner: Whiteco Industries
- Operator: Star Productions
- Capacity: 3,400

Construction
- Opened: December 19, 1979
- Closed: December 17, 2017
- Demolished: Summer 2018
- Cost: $12 million ($59.2 million in 2025 dollars)

Website
- Official Website

The Star Plaza Theatre (originally the Holiday Star Theatre) was a live music venue located in Merrillville, Indiana. It was a 3,400-seat intimate venue with two seating levels in a semicircle around the stage. The Main Floor Level sat 2,000 people, and the Mezzanine Level, which overhangs the main level about midway, sat 1,400. The furthest seat in the auditorium was 120 feet from the stage. Among the entertainers to appear at the Star Plaza were Jerry Seinfeld, Bob Dylan, and Chris Rock.

The Star Plaza Theatre closed on December 17, 2017, after its final show with the only act to perform every year that the theater was open, The Oak Ridge Boys. The final song sung on the stage was "Amazing Grace". Demolition lasted throughout summer 2018.
