= Giving You the Best That I Got (album) =

Studio album by Anita Baker
- Released: October 18, 1988
- Recorded: 1988
- Studios: Encore Studios (Burbank, California); Yamaha International Recording (Glendale, California); Hitsville Studios and Producers 1 & 2 (Hollywood, California); The Sound Suite (Detroit, Michigan); TMF Studios and Gnome Studios (New York City, New York)
- Genre: R&B
- Length: 34:33
- Label: Elektra
- Producer: Michael J. Powell

Anita Baker chronology
Rapture (1986)	Giving You the Best That I Got (1988)	Compositions (1990)

Singles from Giving You the Best That I Got
- 1. "Giving You the Best That I Got" Released: September 27, 1988; 2. "Just Because" Released: January 1989; 3. "Lead Me into Love" Released: April 1989

Giving You the Best That I Got is the third studio album by American R&B/soul singer Anita Baker, released on October 18, 1988, by Elektra Records. It was Baker's first and only #1 album in the US, her second #1 R&B Album, and was certified 3× platinum in 1989 by the RIAA. The title track was released as the first single from the album and became Baker's highest-charting single in the US, peaking at #3 on the Billboard Hot 100. The album earned Baker three Grammy Awards and three Soul Train Music Awards. The track "You Belong to Me" (co-written by Terry Britten, Billy Livsey and Graham Lyle) is not to be confused with Baker's cover of the 1977 song of the same name (originally by The Doobie Brothers and popularized by Carly Simon), which she recorded for the 1990 compilation album Rubáiyát: Elektra's 40th Anniversary and later re-recorded for her 1994 album Rhythm of Love (also produced by Michael J. Powell) and released as a single the following year.

== Track listing ==
1. "Priceless" (Garry Glenn) – 5:00
2. "Lead Me into Love" (Steve Lane, Larry Prentiss) – 4:45
3. "Giving You the Best That I Got" (Baker, Randy Holland, Skip Scarborough) – 4:18
4. "Good Love" (Gary Taylor) – 5:39
5. "Rules" (Graham Lamb, Phil Nicholl, Maggie Ryder) – 3:52
6. "Good Enough" (Baker, James McBride) – 4:50
7. "Just Because" (Alex Brown, Sammy McKinney, Michael O'Hara) – 5:13
8. "You Belong to Me" (Terry Britten, Billy Livsey, Graham Lyle) – 3:50

== Critical reception ==
Professional ratings
Review scores
Source	Rating
AllMusic	4/5 stars
The Village Voice	C+

Alex Henderson of AllMusic rated the album four points out of five, calling it not "on the par with" Baker's previous albums but better than most of R&B albums released in 1988.

== Commercial performance ==
The album has sold over 5 million copies worldwide (including 3 million from the US).

It became Baker's first and only number one album on Billboard 200 and her second number-one R&B Album. In March 1989, the album was certified 3× Platinum in 1989 by the RIAA.

=== Singles ===
The title track became Baker's highest charting US hit, peaking at number three on the Billboard Hot 100, and number one on both the R&B (Hot Black Singles) and Adult Contemporary charts. In Canada, it was also her highest-charting hit, peaking at number 11 on the RPM charts in 1988.

"Just Because" peaked at number one on the Hot Black Singles, making it Baker's second number one and also made the Billboard Hot 100, peaking at number fourteen. In Canada, it peaked at number 18 on the RPM charts in 1989. It has since been described as a wedding reception favorite.

"Lead Me into Love" peaked at number four on the Hot Black Singles and 32 on the Adult Contemporary chart.

== Personnel ==
=== Musicians ===
- Anita Baker – lead vocals, backing vocals (4, 5), BGV arrangements (5)
- Robbie Buchanan – keyboards (1, 2, 5, 7), synthesizer programming (1, 2, 7, 8), string arrangements (7)
- Vernon Fails – keyboards (1–4, 6)
- Dave Boruff – synthesizer programming (1, 8), saxophone (8)
- George Duke – acoustic piano (2)
- Bobby Lyle – acoustic piano (2)
- Sir Dean Gant – acoustic piano (3, 6)
- Gary Taylor – keyboards (4)
- Joseph Vitarelli – Synclavier (4)
- Peter Schwartz – keyboards (5)
- Bruce Nazarian – Synclavier programming (5)
- Reginald "Sonny" Burke – keyboards (8)
- Patrick Moten – keyboards (8)
- Neal Walker – keyboards (8)
- Paul Jackson Jr. – guitars (1, 2, 5, 7)
- Michael J. Powell – guitars (1, 2, 4, 5, 8), string arrangements (7)
- Donnie Lyle – guitars (4)
- Nathan East – bass (1–3, 5–7)
- Omar Hakim – drums (1–3, 6)
- Paulinho da Costa – percussion (1–3, 5, 6)
- Gerald Albright – saxophone (6)
- Courtlen Hale – saxophone (8)
- Chuck Findley – trumpet (8)
- Paul Riser – string arrangements (1, 2)
- Alex Brown – backing vocals (1, 3, 7), BGV arrangements (7)
- Angel Edwards – backing vocals (1, 3)
- Valerie Pinkston-Mayo – backing vocals (1, 3), BGV arrangements (1, 3)
- Carol Perry – backing vocals (2), BGV arrangements (2)
- Darlene Perry – backing vocals (2), BGV arrangements (2)
- Lori Perry – backing vocals (2, 7), BGV arrangements (2)
- Sharon Perry – backing vocals (2), BGV arrangements (2)
- Marva King – backing vocals (7)
- Roy Galloway – backing vocals (8)
- Lynne Fiddmont – backing vocals (8)
- Fred White – backing vocals (8)

=== Production ===
- Anita Baker – executive producer
- Michael J. Powell – producer
- Barney Perkins – engineer
- Milton Chan – second engineer
- Les Cooper – assistant engineer
- Fred Law – assistant engineer
- Bruce Nazarian – assistant engineer
- Tim Purvis – assistant engineer
- Bernie Grundman – mastering at Bernie Grundman Mastering (Hollywood, California)
- Sephra Herman – production coordinator
- Tweed and Tominaga – production coordination
- Carol Bobolts – art direction
- Adrian Buckmaster –photography
- BNB Associates, Ltd. – management

== Charts ==
=== Weekly charts ===
Chart (1988)	Peak position
Australian Albums (ARIA)	47
European Albums (Music & Media)	35
New Zealand Albums (RMNZ)	15
Swedish Albums (Sverigetopplistan)	21
UK Albums (Official Charts)	9
US Billboard 200	1
US Top R&B/Hip-Hop Albums (Billboard)	1

Chart performance
Chart (2026)	Peak position
Croatian International Albums (HDU)	14

=== Year-end charts ===
Chart (1989)	Position
US Billboard 200	17
US Top R&B/Hip-Hop Albums (Billboard)	7

== Certifications ==
Region	Certification	Certified units/sales
United Kingdom (BPI)	Gold	100,000^{^}
United States (RIAA)	3× Platinum	3,000,000^{^}
^{^} Shipments figures based on certification alone.

== See also ==
- List of number-one R&B albums of 1988 (U.S.)
- List of number-one R&B albums of 1989 (U.S.)
- List of number-one albums of 1988 (U.S.)
- List of number-one albums of 1989 (U.S.)
