= Body and Soul (Anita Baker song) =

Single by Anita Baker

from the album Rhythm of Love
- B-side: "Sweet Love"; "Caught Up in the Rapture"; "Giving You the Best That I Got"
- Released: August 1994
- Genre: Pop; R&B; gospel; soul jazz
- Length: 3:58
- Label: Elektra
- Songwriters: Ellen Shipley; Rick Nowels
- Producer: Barry J. Eastmond

Anita Baker singles chronology
"Fairy Tales" (1990)	"Body and Soul" (1994)	"I Apologize" (1994)

Music video
- "Body and Soul" on YouTube

"Body and Soul" is a song by American recording artist Anita Baker, released in August 1994 by Elektra Records, as the lead single in support of her fifth album, Rhythm of Love (1994). The song was written by Ellen Shipley and Rick Nowels, and produced by Barry J. Eastmond. It received critical acclaim, peaking at number four on the US Billboard Hot Black Singles chart and number 36 on the US Billboard Hot 100. The song earned Baker another top 40 hit following 1988's "Just Because", which peaked at number 14 on the Hot 100. In Europe, the song charted in the UK and the Netherlands, reaching number 14 on the latter chart. It won an award in the category for Female R&B/soul single at the 1995 Soul Train Music Awards. The accompanying music video was directed by American director Kevin Bray and received a nomination for R&B/soul music video at the 1995 Soul Train Music Awards.

== Critical reception ==
Larry Flick from Billboard magazine wrote, "What a pleasure it is to welcome Baker back to the fold. On this glorious peek into her new Rhythm Of Love opus, she gives us the beautiful tones that have set her apart from the typical R&B diva, warmly embracing a soothing retro-pop ballad arrangement. A bit more adult and sophisticated than top 40 is currently programming, but we pray that tastemakers will make room for something so creatively satisfying. It's so rare that we are given music of this high caliber." Steve Baltin from Cash Box said, "Clearly Baker from the first note, the song stands out in the crowded R&B field because of its slightly jazzy feel. A winner all the way." Caroline Sullivan from The Guardian felt "her lazy phrasing deftly lifts the string-saturated 'Body and Soul' out of Whitney Houston-ville".

Chuck Campbell from Knoxville News Sentinel remarked that the singer "flaunts her power belting" on the song. Pan-European magazine Music & Media commented, "Soul music's best female balladeer gives a lesson in body language. Advise listeners of lovers' radio to dim the lights, move their body gently and let their heart speak." Alan Jones from Music Week wrote, "After a lengthy lay-off, Baker returns with a waltz, no less, penned by Ellen Shipley and Rick Nowels, who more usually provide Belinda Carlisle with hits. And while it is not the stuff of which Top 10 hits are made, it tees up her album very nicely." James Hamilton from the Record Mirror Dance Update described it as a "gorgeous bluesy piano played wailing husky gospel-jazz-soul waltz" in his weekly dance column. Jonathan Bernstein from Spin magazine named it a "standout" track of the album and a "slowburning classic".

== Charts ==
=== Weekly charts ===
Chart (1994)	Peak position
Europe (European Hit Radio)	32
Netherlands (Dutch Single Tip)	14
Scotland (OCC)	48
UK Singles (OCC)	48
UK Airplay (Music Week)	27
US Billboard Hot 100	36
US Adult Contemporary (Billboard)	22
US Hot R&B/Hip-Hop Songs (Billboard)	4
US Rhythmic Airplay (Billboard)	24
US Cash Box Top 100	39

=== Year-end charts ===
Chart (1994)	Position
US Hot R&B/Hip-Hop Songs (Billboard)	28
US Urban Singles (Cash Box)	14
