= Anita Baker =

American singer-songwriter (born 1958)

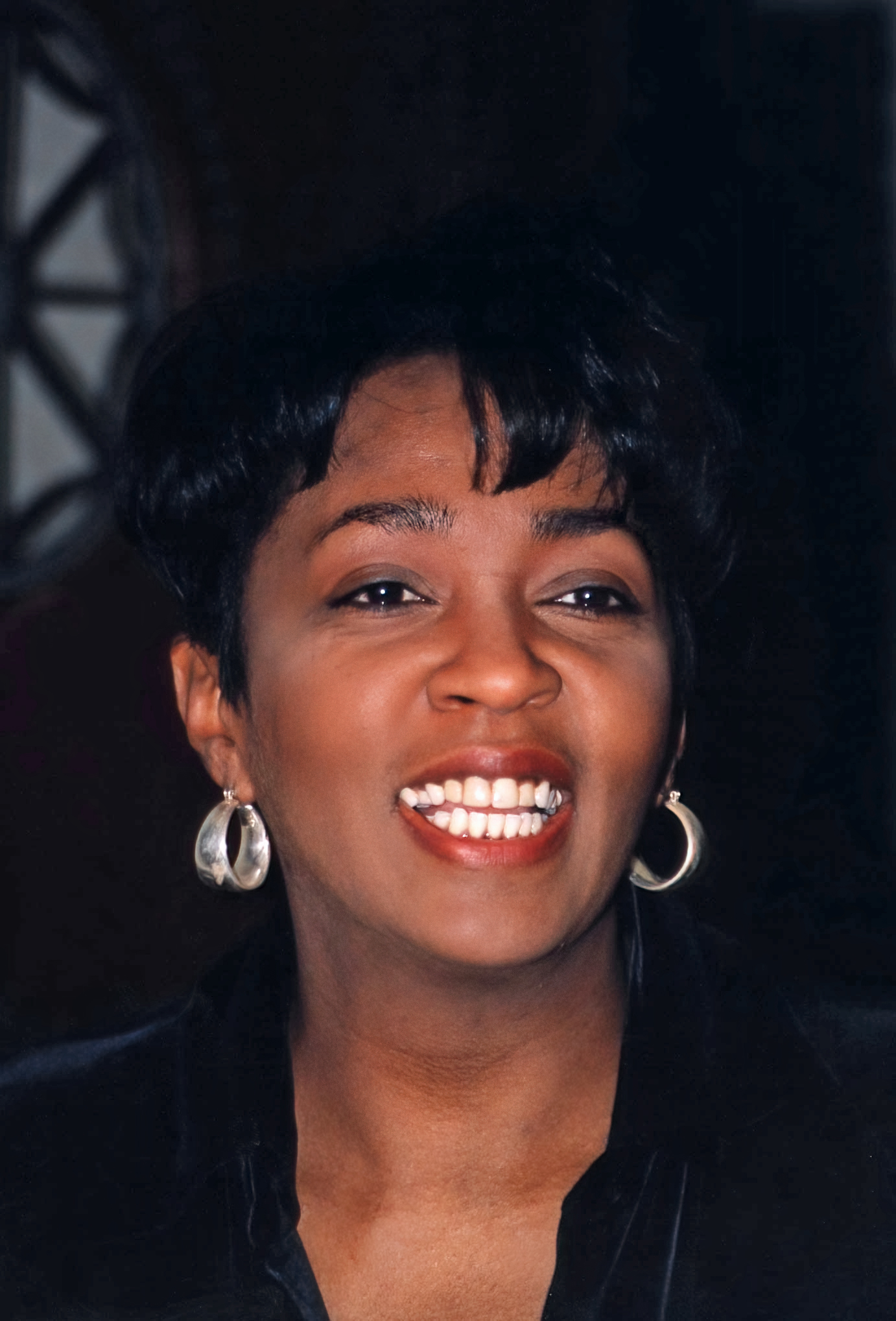
- Baker in 1998

Background information
- Born: Anita Denise Baker; January 26, 1958 (age 68); Toledo, Ohio, U.S.
- Origin: Detroit, Michigan, U.S.
- Genres: Soul jazz; quiet storm; smooth jazz; soul; R&B
- Occupation: Singer-songwriter
- Years active: 1979–present
- Labels: Ariola; Beverly Glen; Elektra; Atlantic; Blue Note

Anita Denise Baker (born January 26, 1958) is an American jazz and soul singer. She is known for her soulful ballads, particularly from the height of the quiet storm period in the 1980s.

Starting her career in the late 1970s with the funk band Chapter 8, Baker released her first solo album, The Songstress, in 1983. In 1986, she rose to fame following the release of her Platinum-selling second album, Rapture, which included the Grammy-winning single "Sweet Love". As of 2017, Baker has won eight Grammy Awards and has four Platinum albums, along with two Gold albums. Baker is a contralto with a wide range of octaves.

== Life and music career ==
=== 1958–1982: Early life, career beginnings and Chapter 8 ===
Anita Baker was born on January 26, 1958, in Toledo, Ohio. When she was two, her mother abandoned her and Baker was raised by a foster family in Detroit, Michigan. When Baker was 12, her foster parents died and her foster sister raised her afterwards. By the time Baker was 16, she began singing R&B at Detroit nightclubs. After one performance, she was discovered by bandleader David Washington, who gave her a card to audition for the funk band, Chapter 8.

Baker joined Chapter 8 in 1975 and the group toured until securing a deal with Ariola Records in 1979. The group's first album, Chapter 8, was released that year and featured the singles "Ready for Your Love", a duet between Baker and bandmate Gerald Lyles, and the Baker-led "I Just Want to Be Your Girl." After Ariola was bought out by Arista Records in 1979, Chapter 8 was dropped by the label who were convinced that Baker, as the group's lead singer, did not have "star potential." Baker returned to Detroit, working as a waitress and a receptionist until, in 1982, Otis Smith, a former associate of Ariola, convinced Baker to start a solo career under his Beverly Glen label.

=== 1983–1988: The Songstress, Rapture and Giving You the Best That I Got ===
Baker released her debut solo album, The Songstress, in May 1983. The album produced four singles: "No More Tears" and its B-side, "Will You Be Mine", "Angel" and "You're the Best Thing Yet". "Angel" became Baker's first R&B top ten single, reaching number five on the R&B chart in late 1983. "You're the Best Thing Yet" followed it in the R&B top 40 early the following year.

Despite this early success, Baker later complained that she had not received any royalties from the work. In addition, the label delayed work on Baker's follow-up of The Songstress. By 1984, after two years, Baker sought to leave the label, but was sued by Smith for breach of contract in 1985. After months in court debating the matter, it was concluded that Baker should be allowed to record for other labels, winning the case against Beverly Glen label owner Otis Smith. Baker then signed with the Warner Music Group-associated Elektra Records label in 1985 and began working on her next album. Her Elektra contract allowed the singer to have creative control and produce her own music.

In March 1986, Baker released her second album, Rapture. While sales were initially slow following the release of the album's debut single, "Watch Your Step", Elektra released the mid-tempo ballad, "Sweet Love", which became her first pop hit, reaching number eight on the Billboard Hot 100 and also reaching the UK Top 20. The album eventually launched three further hit singles, including "Caught Up in the Rapture", "No One in the World" and "Same Ole Love (365 Days a Year)".

Throughout 1986 and 1987, Baker promoted the album by touring, headlining her first tour, The Rapture Tour, a show from which was later released on home video as A Night of Rapture. By 1988, the album had sold over eight million copies worldwide, five million of which were sold in the United States alone. The album resulted in Baker's winning two Grammy Awards at the 1987 ceremony.

In 1987, Baker collaborated with The Winans on their song, "Ain't No Need to Worry", which gave Baker a third Grammy, this time in the Best Soul Gospel Performance by a Duo or Group, Choir or Chorus category.

Baker's follow-up album, Giving You the Best That I Got, was released in October 1988 and immediately became a success, topping the Billboard 200 and selling five million copies worldwide, three million of which sold alone in the United States. The title track reached number three on the Billboard Hot 100 and topped the R&B and adult contemporary charts, becoming her highest-charting single. The follow-up, "Just Because", reached the top 20 on the pop chart while also becoming an R&B chart-topper, while a third single, "Lead Me Into Love", became a top ten R&B hit. The album resulted in three more Grammy Awards for the singer.

=== 1990–2002: Compositions, motherhood, Rhythm of Love and tour ===
In 1990, Baker released Compositions, which had Baker more involved in the songwriting and production process, and the first in which she began incorporating more jazz elements than in previous albums. The album launched the singles "Talk to Me", "Soul Inspiration" and "Fairy Tales", and eventually sold over a million copies.

After the end of the album's touring and promotion schedule in 1991, Baker took a break from the business to settle down with her husband at the time, later having two children with him. Meanwhile, Elektra bought the rights to, and reissued, her first album, The Songstress.

After appearing on Frank Sinatra's Duets album, Baker returned to the charts with Rhythm of Love in 1994. The album featured "Body and Soul", her first top 40 pop hit since 1989. The second single, the mid-tempo "I Apologize", won Baker an eighth Grammy. The album eventually sold over two million copies: her fourth consecutive platinum-selling album. Baker undertook the Rhythm of Love World Tour from December 14, 1994, to November 14, 1995. Baker was transferred to another label within the Warner Music Group, Atlantic Records, in 1996.

Taking a hiatus after the end of the Rhythm of Love Tour to care for her two sons, Baker returned to the studio in 2000. In May 2001, she filed a lawsuit against Zomba Recording and its Dreamhire division for alleged damage to her recordings by a hired 24-track tape machine. Due to a label restructuring, Baker was let go from Atlantic that November without releasing any material with the company. During this hiatus, Rhino Records released the compilation, The Best of Anita Baker (named Sweet Love: The Very Best of Anita Baker in the UK) in June 2002. The album eventually was certified platinum by the RIAA, denoting sales in excess of 1,000,000 units in the US.

=== 2004–2008: My Everything, Christmas Fantasy and tour ===
That year, Baker returned to live performing, signing with Blue Note Records in March 2004. That September, Baker released the album, My Everything. The album peaked at number four on the Billboard 200 and number-one on the R&B charts, eventually being certified gold.

In 2005, Baker released Christmas Fantasy, winning a Grammy nomination for the song, "Christmas Time Is Here". In May 2005, Baker was awarded an Honorary Doctorate of Music from Berklee College of Music. Starting in 2007, Baker embarked on a two-year concert tour titled An Evening with Anita Baker. She occasionally sang the American national anthem at sports events. "I met Anita at the Grammy Awards in 2007," said Mary J. Blige. "I told [her] how much she meant to me. She said, 'I'm glad that you picked up the ball where I left off.' That meant a lot."

=== 2010–present: New music, tour, brief retirement, and comeback ===
Baker had been working on a new album featuring the single, "Only Forever", since 2010. In August 2012, Baker released her version of Tyrese's hit, "Lately". The song made headlines for Baker after the song was played every hour, on the hour, throughout the day on urban adult contemporary radio, making her the first artist to make this kind of debut. Though Blue Note set release dates for the album in October and December 2012, Baker decided she still needed to work on the album, causing delays. The album never materialized.

In February 2013, Baker returned to the national spotlight, performing "Lately" and "Same Ole Love" on Jimmy Kimmel Live!. That same month, she appeared at the Grammys where "Lately" was nominated for a Grammy Award for Best R&B Performance. In January 2017, Baker confirmed she had retired. She emerged from retirement in 2018.

In March 2021, Baker entered into a conflict with Elektra Records over rights to her master recordings, which she claimed were supposed to return to her after the expiration of her contract, according to copyright law. She asked fans to stop buying and streaming her music until the rights to her music were given to her. In September 2021, she announced that the dispute had been settled and that she owned her masters.

Baker performed "The Star-Spangled Banner" at Philadelphia's Lincoln Financial Field prior to the 2022 NFC Championship Game between the Eagles and San Francisco 49ers.

In 2023, Rolling Stone ranked Baker at number 92 on its list of the 200 Greatest Singers of All Time.

== Personal life ==
Baker married Walter Bridgforth Jr. on December 24, 1988, at their home in Detroit. In the following year, Baker had a miscarriage. They had two sons, Walter Baker Bridgforth (born January 1993) and Edward Carlton Bridgforth (born May 1994). The couple separated in 2005 and finalized their divorce two years later. Baker currently lives in Grosse Pointe Park, Michigan.

More than five years after her divorce, Baker filed for a legal last name change from Bridgforth to her maiden name in her private life.

Baker publicly endorsed presidential candidate Andrew Yang in the 2020 Democratic presidential primary.

== Discography ==
Studio albums

- The Songstress (1983)
- Rapture (1986)
- Giving You the Best That I Got (1988)
- Compositions (1990)
- Rhythm of Love (1994)
- My Everything (2004)
- Christmas Fantasy (2005)

== Tours ==
- The Rapture Tour (1986–1987)
- The Heat: Luther & Anita Live! (with Luther Vandross) (1988)
- Anita Baker in Concert (1989)
- Compositions World Tour (1990)
- Rhythm of Love World Tour (1994–1995)
- Anita Live! (2002–2004)
- An Evening with Anita Baker (2007–2009)
- Anita Baker: Farewell Concert Series (2018–2019)
- The Songstress Tour (2023)

== Awards and honors ==
In 2013, Anita Baker was inducted into the Michigan Rock and Roll Legends Hall of Fame.

=== BET Awards ===
The BET Awards were established in 2001 by the Black Entertainment Television network to celebrate African Americans in music, acting, sports, and other fields of entertainment over the past year. The awards are presented annually, and are broadcast live on BET.

Year	Nominee / work	Award	Result
2018	Anita Baker	Lifetime Achievement Award	Won

=== Grammy Awards ===
The Grammy Awards are awarded annually by the National Academy of Recording Arts and Sciences. Baker has received eight awards from 18 nominations.

Year	Nominee / work	Award	Result
1987	Rapture	Best R&B Vocal Performance, Female	Won
1987	"Sweet Love"	Best Rhythm & Blues Song	Won
1988	"Ain't No Need to Worry" (with The Winans)	Best Soul Gospel Performance by a Duo, Group, Choir or Chorus	Won
1989	"Giving You the Best That I Got"	Record of the Year	Nominated
1989	"Giving You the Best That I Got"	Song of the Year	Nominated
1989	"Giving You the Best That I Got"	Best R&B Vocal Performance, Female	Won
1989	"Giving You the Best That I Got"	Best Rhythm & Blues Song	Won
1990	Giving You the Best That I Got	Best R&B Vocal Performance, Female	Won
1991	Compositions	Best R&B Vocal Performance, Female	Won
1991	Compositions	Best Album Package	Nominated
1995	"Body and Soul"	Best Female R&B Vocal Performance	Nominated
1995	Rhythm of Love	Best R&B Album	Nominated
1996	"When You Love Someone" (with James Ingram)	Best Pop Collaboration with Vocals	Nominated
1996	"I Apologize"	Best Female R&B Vocal Performance	Won
2005	"You're My Everything"	Best Traditional R&B Vocal Performance	Nominated
2005	My Everything	Best R&B Album	Nominated
2007	"Christmas Time Is Here"	Best Traditional R&B Vocal Performance	Nominated
2013	"Lately"	Best Traditional R&B Performance	Nominated

=== American Music Awards ===
The American Music Awards is an annual awards ceremony created by Dick Clark in 1973. Baker has received four awards from nine nominations.

Year	Nominee / work	Award	Result
1987	Anita Baker	Favorite Soul/R&B Female Artist	Nominated
1987	Rapture	Favorite Soul/R&B Album	Nominated
1988	Anita Baker	Favorite Soul/R&B Female Artist	Won
1988	Rapture	Favorite Soul/R&B Album	Won
1990	Anita Baker	Favorite Pop/Rock Female Artist	Nominated
1990	Anita Baker	Favorite Soul/R&B Female Artist	Won
1990	"Just Because"	Favorite Soul/R&B Single	Nominated
1995	Anita Baker	Favorite Soul/R&B Female Artist	Won
1996	Anita Baker	Favorite Soul/R&B Female Artist	Nominated

=== Soul Train Music Awards ===
The Soul Train Music Awards is an annual award show aired in national broadcast syndication that honors the best in African American music and entertainment established in 1987.

Year	Nominee / work	Award	Result
1987	"Sweet Love"	Best Single, Female	Won
1987	"Sweet Love"	Best Music Video	Nominated
1987	Rapture	Album of the Year, Female	Nominated
1989	"Giving You the Best That I Got"	Best R&B/Urban Contemporary Song of the Year	Won
1989	"Giving You the Best That I Got"	Best R&B/Urban Contemporary Single, Female	Won
1989	Giving You the Best That I Got	Best R&B/Urban Contemporary Album of the Year, Female	Won
1991	"Talk to Me"	Best R&B/Urban Contemporary Single, Female	Nominated
1991	Compositions	Best R&B/Urban Contemporary Album of the Year, Female	Nominated
1995	"Body and Soul"	Best R&B/Soul or Rap Music Video	Nominated
1995	"Body and Soul"	Best R&B/Soul Single, Female	Won
1995	Rhythm of Love	R&B/Soul Album of the Year, Female	Won
2010	Anita Baker	Legend Award, Female	Won

=== Other honors ===
Year	Category	Organization	Result
1994	Hollywood Walk of Fame		Star at 7021 Hollywood Blvd.
2005	International Artist of the Year	Canadian Smooth Jazz Award	Won
