= Compositions (album) =

Studio album by Anita Baker
- Released: July 3, 1990
- Recorded: 1990
- Studios: Encore Studios (Burbank, California); Ocean Way Recording (Hollywood, California); Studio Ultimo (Los Angeles, California); Sound Lab 1 (Detroit, Michigan); Ambience Recorders (Farmington Hills, Michigan); Unique Recording Studios (New York City, New York)
- Genres: R&B; soul jazz; smooth jazz
- Length: 50:27
- Label: Elektra
- Producer: Michael J. Powell

Anita Baker chronology
Giving You the Best That I Got (1988)	Compositions (1990)	Rhythm of Love (1994)

Singles from Compositions
- 1. "Talk to Me" Released: June 1990; 2. "Soul Inspiration" Released: September 1990; 3. "Fairy Tales" Released: December 1990

Professional ratings
Review scores
Source	Rating
AllMusic	3/5 stars
Calgary Herald	A
Chicago Tribune	3/4 stars
Robert Christgau	(dud)
Entertainment Weekly	B
Rolling Stone	3/5 stars
Select	4/5

Compositions is the fourth album by American R&B/soul singer Anita Baker. It was released on July 3, 1990, by Elektra Records. The album peaked at #5 on the US Billboard 200 and was certified platinum in 1990, making it Baker's third platinum selling album. The album also won the Grammy Award for Best Female R&B Vocal Performance at the 1991 Grammy Awards. Two of its tracks charted on the Billboard Hot 100, with "Talk to Me" peaking at number 44 for three consecutive weeks on July 28 and August 4 and 11 and "Soul Inspiration" at number 72 on October 13, 1990. Compositions would be the last album and collaboration between Baker and producer Michael J. Powell.

== Track listing ==
1. "Talk to Me" (Baker, Vernon Fails, Michael Powell) – 5:03
2. "Perfect Love Affair" (Baker, Joel Davis) – 5:19
3. "Whatever It Takes" (Baker, Marc Gordon, Gerald LeVert) – 5:35
4. "Soul Inspiration" (Terry Britten, Graham Lyle) – 5:17
5. "Lonely" (Baker) – 4:29
6. "No One to Blame" (Baker, Fails) – 4:41
7. "More Than You Know" (Baker, Vernon Fails, Michael Powell) – 4:48
8. "Love You to the Letter" (James McBride) – 7:20
9. "Fairy Tales" (Baker, Fails, Powell) – 7:55

== Personnel ==
=== Musicians ===
- Anita Baker – vocals, backing vocals
- Vernon Fails – keyboards
- Greg Phillinganes – acoustic piano, backing vocals (7)
- Ben Keys – programming
- David Ward – programming
- Michael J. Powell – guitars (1–4, 6, 7, 9), backing vocals (7)
- Earl Klugh – guitars (7)
- Nathan East – bass, backing vocals (7)
- Ricky Lawson – drums (1, 4, 5, 7)
- Steve Ferrone – drums (2, 3, 6, 8, 9)
- Paulinho da Costa – percussion (1, 2, 4–9)
- Perri (Carol, Darlene, Lori and Sharon Perry) – backing vocals (2, 4, 7), BGV arrangements (4)

=== Production ===
- Anita Baker – executive producer, art direction, hair styling
- Michael J. Powell – producer
- Tweed and Tominaga – production coordination
- Carol Bobolts – art direction
- Adrian Buckmaster – photography
- Alexander White – styling
- Reggie Wells – make-up
- John Stevens – lettering
- BNB Associates, Ltd. – management

Technical credits

- Bernie Grundman – mastering at Bernie Grundman Mastering (Hollywood, California)
- Michael J. Powell – mixing
- Barney Perkins – engineer, mixing (1, 3, 5–9)
- Milton Chan – assistant engineer, additional engineer
- Darroll Gustamachio – additional engineer
- Elliot Peters – additional engineer
- Gerard Smerek – additional engineer, mixing (2, 4)
- Tom Beiner – second engineer
- Steve Gallagher – second engineer
- Bart Stevens – second engineer

== Awards ==
Grammy Awards

Year	Work	Category	Result
1991	Compositions	Best Female R&B Vocal Performance	Won
1991	Compositions	Best Album Package	Nominated

== Charts ==
=== Weekly charts ===
Weekly chart performance for Compositions
Chart (1990)	Peak position
Australian Albums (ARIA)	54
Canada Top Albums/CDs (RPM)	13
Dutch Albums (Album Top 100)	17
European Albums (Music & Media)	29
German Albums (Offizielle Top 100)	36
New Zealand Albums (RMNZ)	20
Swedish Albums (Sverigetopplistan)	22
UK Albums (Official Charts)	7
US Billboard 200	5
US Top Contemporary Jazz Albums (Billboard)	4
US Top R&B/Hip-Hop Albums (Billboard)	3

=== Year-end charts ===
1990 year-end chart performance for Compositions
Chart (1990)	Position
Canada Top Albums/CDs (RPM)	71
US Billboard 200	56
US Top Contemporary Jazz Albums (Billboard)	22
US Top R&B/Hip-Hop Albums (Billboard)	28

1991 year-end chart performance for Compositions
Chart (1991)	Position
US Top R&B/Hip-Hop Albums (Billboard)	59

== Certifications ==
Certifications and sales for Compositions
Region	Certification	Certified units/sales
United Kingdom (BPI)	Gold	100,000^{^}
United States (RIAA)	Platinum	1,000,000^{^}
^{^} Shipments figures based on certification alone.
