= Giving You the Best That I Got (song) =

Single by Anita Baker

from the album Giving You the Best That I Got
- B-side: "Good Enough"
- Released: September 27, 1988
- Recorded: 1988
- Genre: R&B; soul
- Length: 4:18 (album version); 3:54 (single version)
- Label: Elektra
- Songwriters: Anita Denise Baker; Clarence Alexander Scarborough; Randy Holland
- Producer: Michael J. Powell

Anita Baker singles chronology
"Ain't No Need to Worry" (1987)	"Giving You the Best That I Got" (1988)	"Just Because" (1989)

"Giving You the Best That I Got" is a song by American R&B recording artist Anita Baker, taken from her third studio album of the same name (1988). The song was released as the album's lead single on September 27, 1988 by Elektra Records. The music video was filmed inside the 109th Field Artillery in Kingston, Pennsylvania. The song was written by Baker, Clarence Alexander Scarborough, and Randy Holland, and produced by Michael J. Powell.

== Composition ==
Songwriter Skip Scarborough had offered the song to various singers, including Howard Hewett, without success. Prior to recording the song, Baker made some changes to the original, including improvising a scat opening and requesting that the tempo of the song be increased.

== Chart performance ==
The song was Baker's highest charting hit on the Billboard Hot 100, where it peaked at number three in December 1988. It also spent two weeks at number one on the Billboard R&B chart in November 1988, Baker's first number-one single on this tally. In addition, the song spent one week atop the Billboard adult contemporary chart in December 1988. It is also Baker's first number-one single on this chart.

== Awards ==
The song "Giving You the Best That I Got" was released prior to the Grammy Awards eligibility cutoff date of September 30, allowing it to be nominated for four awards at the Grammy Awards of 1989. The song won in the categories Best R&B Vocal Performance, Female and Best R&B Song; it was also nominated for both Record of the Year and Song of the Year. The album Giving You the Best That I Got was released in October 1988, meaning that it would not be eligible for Grammy consideration until the 1990 ceremony. There, Baker's album won in the category Best Female R&B Vocal Performance, earning her the same award two years running for a song and album of the same title.

== In popular culture ==
The song was featured in a season 10 episode of Knots Landing. The song was also used in a late 1988 episode of the US daytime soap opera All My Children as well as a 1989 episode of Guiding Light. In 2019, the song appeared in the second episode of season 2 of Pose.

Michael Jordan would often sing this song to his opponents as a way of trash talking them.

== Personnel ==
- Anita Baker – lead vocals
- Vernon D. Fails – keyboards
- Dean "Sir" Gant – acoustic piano
- Nathan East – bass
- Omar Hakim – drums
- Paulinho da Costa – percussion
- Alex Brown – backing vocals
- Angel Edwards – backing vocals
- Valerie Pinkston Mayo – backing vocals, BGV arrangements
- Guy Snider - engineer

== Charts ==
=== Weekly charts ===
Chart (1988–1989)	Peak position
Canada Top Singles (RPM)	11
Italy Airplay (Music & Media)	5
New Zealand (Recorded Music NZ)	25
UK Singles (OCC)	55
US Billboard Hot 100	3
US Adult Contemporary (Billboard)	1
US Hot Black Singles (Billboard)	1

=== Year-end charts ===
Chart (1989)	Position
US Billboard Hot 100	10
US Adult Contemporary (Billboard)	24

== See also ==
- List of number-one R&B singles of 1988 (U.S.)
- List of number-one adult contemporary singles of 1988 (U.S.)
