= Sweet Love (Anita Baker song) =

1986 single by American singer Anita Baker

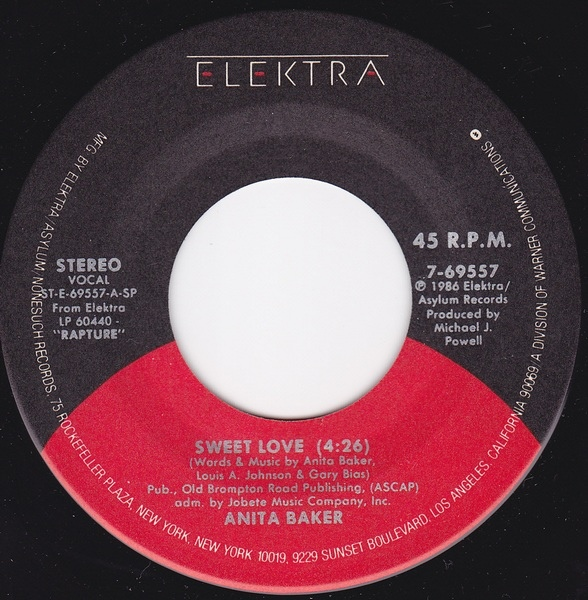
- A-side label of U.S. vinyl pressing

Single by Anita Baker

from the album Rapture
- B-side: "Watch Your Step"
- Released: 1986
- Recorded: 1985
- Genre: R&B; soul; quiet storm
- Length: 4:26
- Label: Elektra
- Songwriters: Anita Baker; Louis A. Johnson; Gary Bias
- Producer: Michael J. Powell

Anita Baker singles chronology
"Feel the Need" (1984)	"Sweet Love" (1986)	"Caught Up in the Rapture" (1986)

Alternative release
- Cover art for German vinyl pressings, distributed in continental Europe

Audio
- "Sweet Love" on YouTube

"Sweet Love" is a song by American R&B singer and songwriter Anita Baker from her second studio album, Rapture (1986). It was written by Anita Baker, Louis A. Johnson, and Gary Bias, and produced by Michael J. Powell. It was released in May 1986 as the album's first single.

The song was Baker's first big hit single, peaking at number two on the US Billboard R&B chart, number three on the US Billboard Adult Contemporary chart, and number eight on the US Billboard Hot 100 in the fall of 1986. In the UK, it reached number 13 on the UK Singles Chart and peaked at number 21 on Canada's Top Singles chart.

"Sweet Love" won the Grammy Award for Best R&B Song at the 29th Annual Grammy Awards (1987).

== Composition ==
"Sweet Love" was originally published in the key of B♭ minor, and is written in common time with a tempo of 89 beats per minute. Baker's vocals span from E_{3} to F_{5}.

== Critical reception ==
Daryl Easlea of the BBC said that Baker's voice "rings like a bell", and that "Sweet Love" is one of the three most memorable tracks on Rapture. He felt that the lyrics might have sounded trite if sung by a different artist, but that Baker imbued them with "so much passion and wonderment" that they sound like "old love sonnets" brought back to life.

== Awards ==
Baker won two Grammys at the 29th Annual Grammy Awards (1987). "Sweet Love" was selected as Best R&B Song, earning her (along with Gary Bias and Louis A. Johnson) a songwriting award. Also, the album containing this song, Rapture, won in the category Best Female R&B Vocal performance.

== Personnel ==
- Lead vocals: Anita Baker
- Backing vocals: Anita Baker, Jim Gilstrap, Bunny Hull and Daryl Phinnessee
- Drums: Ricky Lawson
- Percussion: Paulinho da Costa
- Bass: Freddie Washington
- Guitar: Greg Moore
- Keyboards, arrangements: Sir Gant

== Track listings ==
7" single Elektra 969 557, 8/1/1986

1. "Sweet Love" – 4:26
2. "Watch Your Step" – 4:56

Limited edition gatefold - 7" single Elektra EKR 44F [UK], 9/30/1986
7" single 1:

1. "Sweet Love" – 4:26
2. "No One in the World" – 4:10

7" single 2:

1. "Same Ole Love (365 Days a Year)" (Live) – 4:01
2. "You Bring Me Joy" (Live) – 4:31

(Extras: Live tracks recorded at the Hammersmith Odeon, July 26 & 27)

7" single Elektra EKR 44 [UK], 11/3/1986

1. "Sweet Love" – 4:26
2. "No One in the World" – 4:10

== Chart performance ==
=== Weekly charts ===
Chart (1986–1987)	Peak position
Canada Adult Contemporary (RPM)	2
Canada Top Singles (RPM)	21
Europe (European Hot 100 Singles)	47
Ireland (IRMA)	10
Netherlands (Single Top 100)	47
UK Singles (Official Charts)	13
US Billboard Hot 100	8
US Adult Contemporary (Billboard)	3
US Hot R&B/Hip-Hop Songs (Billboard)	2
US Cash Box Top 100	12

=== Year-end charts ===
Chart (1986)	Position
U.S. Billboard Hot 100	90

== Certifications ==
Region	Certification	Certified units/sales
United Kingdom (BPI)	Silver	200,000^{‡}
^{‡} Sales+streaming figures based on certification alone.

== Other versions ==
=== M-Beat version ===
British jungle musician M-Beat covered the song in 1994 with singer Nazlyn on vocals. This version peaked at No. 18 on the UK Singles Chart.

=== Fierce version ===
British R&B female trio Fierce covered the song in 1999 which appears on their debut album Right Here Right Now. It was released as a single in 2000 with new production by Stargate, titled "Sweet Love 2K". This version peaked at number three on the UK Singles Chart.
